= SMS Prinzregent Luitpold =

Battleship of the German Imperial Navy

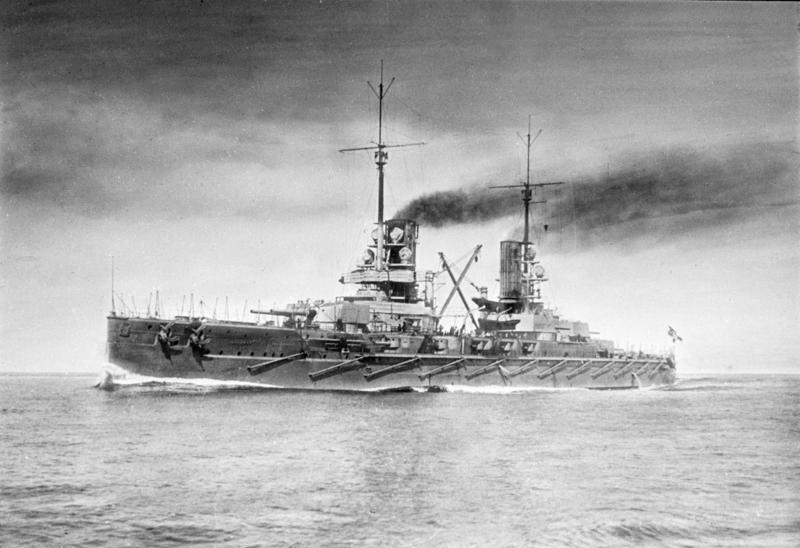
- SMS Prinzregent Luitpold

History

German Empire
- Name: Prinzregent Luitpold
- Namesake: Luitpold, Prince Regent of Bavaria
- Builder: Germaniawerft, Kiel
- Laid down: October 1910
- Launched: 17 February 1912
- Commissioned: 19 August 1913
- Fate: Scuttled at Gutter Sound, Scapa Flow, 21 June 1919
- Notes: Raised in 1931 and broken up for scrapping 1933

General characteristics
- Class & type: Kaiser-class battleship
- Displacement: Normal: 24,724 t (24,334 long tons); Full load: 27,000 t (27,000 long tons)
- Length: 172.4 m (565 ft 7 in)
- Beam: 29.0 m (95 ft 2 in)
- Draft: 9.1 m (29 ft 10 in)
- Installed power: 14 × water-tube boilers; 25,644 shp (19,123 kW)
- Propulsion: 2 × steam turbines; 2 × screw propellers
- Speed: 21.7 knots (40.2 km/h; 25.0 mph)
- Range: 7,900 nmi (14,600 km; 9,100 mi) at 12 knots (22 km/h; 14 mph)
- Crew: 41 officers; 1,043 enlisted
- Armament: 10 × 30.5 cm (12 in) guns; 14 × 15 cm (5.9 in) guns; 12 × 8.8 cm (3.5 in) guns; 5 × 50 cm (19.7 in) torpedo tubes
- Armor: Belt 350 mm (13.8 in); Conning tower: 400 mm (15.7 in); Turrets: 300 mm (11.8 in)

SMS Prinzregent Luitpold (Note: "SMS" stands for "Seiner Majestät Schiff" (German: His Majesty's Ship).) was the fifth and final vessel of the Kaiser class of dreadnought battleships of the Imperial German Navy. Prinzregent Luitpold's keel was laid in October 1910 at the Germaniawerft dockyard in Kiel. She was launched on 17 February 1912 and was commissioned into the navy on 19 August 1913. The ship was equipped with ten 30.5-centimeter (12 in) guns in five twin turrets, and had a top speed of 21.7 knots (40.2 km/h; 25.0 mph).

Prinzregent Luitpold was assigned to III Battle Squadron of the High Seas Fleet for the majority of her career; in December 1916, she was transferred to IV Battle Squadron. Along with her four sister ships, Kaiser, Friedrich der Grosse, Kaiserin, and König Albert, Prinzregent Luitpold participated in all of the major fleet operations of World War I, including the Battle of Jutland on 31 May – 1 June 1916. The ship was also involved in Operation Albion, an amphibious assault on the Russian-held islands in the Gulf of Riga, in late 1917.

After Germany's defeat in the war and the signing of the Armistice in November 1918, Prinzregent Luitpold and most of the capital ships of the High Seas Fleet were interned by the Royal Navy in Scapa Flow. The ships were disarmed and reduced to skeleton crews while the Allied powers negotiated the final version of the Treaty of Versailles. On 21 June 1919, days before the treaty was signed, the commander of the interned fleet, Rear Admiral Ludwig von Reuter, ordered the fleet to be scuttled to ensure that the British would not be able to seize the ships. Prinzregent Luitpold was raised in July 1931 and subsequently broken up for scrap in 1933.

== Design ==
The German 1909 construction program included the last two members of the Helgoland-class battleships, along with two additional dreadnoughts to be built to a new design. The primary change was intended to be the adoption of steam turbines in favor of triple-expansion steam engines used in the earlier vessels. The space savings of turbines permitted a more efficient superfiring arrangement of the main battery, along the same model as the Moltke-class battlecruisers. The new ships' armor layout was significant improved over earlier designs; the Kaiser class was also far superior in defensive characteristics to their British counterparts of the King George V and Iron Duke classes, even if markedly inferior in terms of firepower.

=== Characteristics ===
Plan and profile drawing of the Kaiser class

Prinzregent Luitpold was 172.4 m (565 ft 7 in) long overall and displaced a maximum of 27,000 metric tons (26,570 long tons) at full load. She had a beam of 29 m (95 ft 2 in) and a draft of 9.1 m (29 ft 10 in) forward and 8.8 m (28 ft 10 in) aft. The ship had an inverted bow and a long forecastle deck that extended for two-thirds the length of the hull. Her superstructure was fairly minimal, consisting primarily of a short, armored conning tower forward and a smaller, secondary conning tower aft. Prinzregent Luitpold was fitted with a pair of pole masts for observation and signaling purposes. She had a crew of 41 officers and 1,043 enlisted men.

Prinzregent Luitpold was powered by two sets of Parsons steam turbines, which drove two screw propellers. The turbines were supplied with steam by fourteen coal-fired water-tube boilers that were vented through a pair of widely spaced funnels. Unlike her four sisters, the ship was intended to use a diesel engine on the center shaft, but this was not ready by the time work on the ship was completed. The engine was never installed, and so Prinzregent Luitpold was slightly slower than her sisters, which were equipped with a third turbine on the center shaft. The powerplant produced a top speed of 21.7 knots (40.2 km/h; 25.0 mph). She carried 3,600 metric tons (3,540 long tons) of coal, which enabled a maximum range of 7,900 nautical miles (14,630 km; 9,090 mi) at a cruising speed of 12 knots (22 km/h; 14 mph).

Prinzregent Luitpold was armed with a main battery of ten 30.5 cm SK L/50 guns in five twin turrets. (Note: In Imperial German Navy gun nomenclature, "SK" (Schnelladekanone) denotes that the gun is quick loading, while the L/50 denotes the length of the gun. In this case, the L/50 gun is 50 calibers, meaning that the gun is 45 times as long as it is in bore diameter.) The ship dispensed with the inefficient hexagonal turret arrangement of previous German battleships; instead, three of the five turrets were mounted on the centerline, one forward and two of them arranged in a superfiring pair aft. The other two turrets were placed en echelon amidships, such that both could fire on the broadside. The ship was also armed with a secondary battery of fourteen 15 cm (5.9 in) SK L/45 guns in casemates amidships. For close-range defense against torpedo boats, she carried eight 8.8 cm (3.5 in) SK L/45 guns in casemates. The ship was also armed with four 8.8 cm L/45 anti-aircraft guns. The ship's armament was rounded out by five 50 cm (19.7 in) torpedo tubes, all mounted in the hull; one was in the bow, and the other four were on the broadside.

Her main armored belt was 350 mm (13.8 in) thick in the central citadel, and was composed of Krupp cemented armor (KCA). Her main battery gun turrets were protected by 300 mm (11.8 in) of KCA on the sides and faces. Prinzregent Luitpold's conning tower was heavily armored, with 400 mm (15.7 in) sides.

== Service history ==
Ordered under the contract name Ersatz Odin as a replacement for the obsolete coastal defense ship Odin, (Note: German warships were ordered under provisional names. Additions to the fleet were given a single letter; ships intended to replace older or lost vessels were ordered as "Ersatz (name of the ship to be replaced)".) Prinzregent Luitpold was laid down at the Howaldtswerke dockyard in Kiel in October 1910. She was launched on 17 February 1912 and christened by Princess Theresa of Bavaria; Ludwig III, the last king of Bavaria and the son of the ship's namesake, Luitpold, Prince Regent of Bavaria, gave a speech. After fitting-out work was completed, the ship was commissioned into the fleet on 19 August 1913. Prinzregent Luitpold was equipped with facilities for a squadron commander, and became the flagship of III Battle Squadron upon commissioning.

Directly after commissioning, Prinzregent Luitpold took part in the annual autumn maneuvers, which followed the fleet cruise to Norway. The exercises lasted from 31 August to 9 September. Unit drills and individual ship training were conducted in October and November. In early 1914, Prinzregent Luitpold participated in additional ship and unit training. The annual spring maneuvers were conducted in the North Sea at the end of March. Further fleet exercises followed in April and May in the Baltic and North Seas. The ship went to Kiel Week that year. Despite the rising international tensions following the assassination of Archduke Franz Ferdinand on 28 June, the High Seas Fleet began its summer cruise to Norway on 13 July. During the last peacetime cruise of the Imperial Navy, the fleet conducted drills off Skagen before proceeding to the Norwegian fjords on 25 July. The following day the fleet began to steam back to Germany, as a result of Austria-Hungary's ultimatum to Serbia. On the 27th, the entire fleet assembled off Cape Skadenes before returning to port, where they remained at a heightened state of readiness. War between Austria-Hungary and Serbia broke out the following day, and in the span of a week all of the major European powers had joined the conflict.

=== World War I ===
Prinzregent Luitpold was present during the first sortie by the German fleet into the North Sea, which took place on 2–3 November 1914. No British forces were encountered during the operation. A second operation followed on 15–16 December. This sortie was the initiation of a strategy adopted by Admiral Friedrich von Ingenohl, the commander of the High Seas Fleet. He intended to use the battlecruisers of Konteradmiral (KAdm—Rear Admiral) Franz von Hipper's I Scouting Group to raid British coastal towns to lure out portions of the British Grand Fleet where they could be destroyed by the High Seas Fleet. Early on 15 December the fleet left port to raid the towns of Scarborough, Hartlepool, and Whitby. That evening, the German battle fleet of some twelve dreadnoughts—including Prinzregent Luitpold and her four sisters—and eight pre-dreadnoughts came to within 10 nmi (19 km; 12 mi) of an isolated squadron of six British battleships. However, skirmishes between the rival destroyer screens in the darkness convinced Ingenohl that he was faced with the entire Grand Fleet. Under orders from Kaiser Wilhelm II to avoid risking the fleet unnecessarily, Ingenohl broke off the engagement and turned the battle fleet back toward Germany.

Prinzregent Luitpold went into the Baltic for squadron training from 23 to 29 January 1916. While on the maneuvers, the newer battleship König became III Squadron flagship. Vizeadmiral (VAdm—Vice Admiral) Reinhard Scheer, the commander of III Squadron, lowered his flag on 24 January and transferred it to König. The Kaiser removed Ingenohl from his post on 2 February, following the loss of the armored cruiser SMS Blücher at the Battle of Dogger Bank the month before. Admiral Hugo von Pohl succeeded him as the commander of the fleet. Pohl continued the policy of sweeps into the North Sea to destroy isolated British formations. On 24 April, Prinzregent Luitpold ran aground in the Kaiser Wilhelm Canal, though she was freed without causing significant damage. A series of advances into the North Sea were conducted throughout the rest of 1915; Prinzregent Luitpold was present for the sweeps on 17–18 May, 29–30 May, 10 August, 11–12 September, and 23–24 October. III Squadron completed the year with another round of unit training in the Baltic on 5–20 December.

Pohl's tenure as fleet commander was brief; by January 1916 hepatic cancer had weakened him to the point where he was no longer able to carry out his duties. He was replaced by Scheer in January. Scheer proposed a more aggressive policy designed to force a confrontation with the British Grand Fleet; he received approval from the Kaiser in February. The first of Scheer's operations was conducted the following month, on 5–7 March, with an uneventful sweep of the Hoofden. Prinzregent Luitpold was also present during an advance to the Amrun Bank on 2–3 April. Another sortie was conducted on 21–22 April.

==== Battle of Jutland ====
Maps showing the maneuvers of the British (blue) and German (red) fleets on 31 May – 1 June 1916

Prinzregent Luitpold was present during the fleet operation that resulted in the battle of Jutland which took place on 31 May and 1 June 1916. The German fleet again sought to draw out and isolate a portion of the Grand Fleet and destroy it before the main British fleet could retaliate. During the operation, Prinzregent Luitpold was the third ship in VI Division of III Squadron and the seventh ship in the line, directly astern of Kaiserin and ahead of Friedrich der Grosse. VI Division was behind only V Division, consisting of the four König-class battleships. The eight Helgoland- and Nassau-class battleships of I and II Divisions in I Squadron followed VI Division. The six elderly pre-dreadnoughts of III and IV Divisions in II Battle Squadron formed the rear of the formation.

Shortly before 16:00, the battlecruisers of I Scouting Group encountered the British 1st Battlecruiser Squadron under the command of Vice Admiral David Beatty. The opposing ships began an artillery duel that saw the destruction of Indefatigable, shortly after 17:00, and Queen Mary, less than half an hour later. By this time, the German battlecruisers were steaming south to draw the British ships toward the main body of the High Seas Fleet. At 17:30, the crew of the leading German battleship, König, spotted both I Scouting Group and the 1st Battlecruiser Squadron approaching. The German battlecruisers were steaming to starboard, while the British ships steamed to port. At 17:45, Scheer ordered a two-point turn to port to bring his ships closer to the British battlecruisers, and a minute later, the order to open fire was given. (Note: The compass can be divided into 32 points, each corresponding to 11.25 degrees. A two-point turn to port would alter the ships' course by 22.5 degrees.)

Prinzregent Luitpold engaged the nearest target her gunners could make out, one of the Lion-class battlecruisers, at a range of some 22,300 yd (20,400 m), though her shots fell short. Beatty's ships increased speed and at 17:51 veered away to further increase the distance to the III Squadron battleships. At 18:08, Prinzregent Luitpold shifted her fire to the battleship Malaya at a range of 19,100 yd (17,500 m), though without any success. By 18:38, Malaya disappeared in the haze and Prinzregent Luitpold was forced to cease fire. The British destroyers Nestor and Nomad, which had been disabled earlier in the engagement, lay directly in the path of the advancing High Seas Fleet. Prinzregent Luitpold and her three sisters destroyed Nomad with their secondary guns while the I Squadron battleships dispatched Nestor. At around 19:00, the German battle line came into contact with the 2nd Light Cruiser Squadron; Prinzregent Luitpold fired two salvos from her main battery at an unidentified four-funneled cruiser at 19:03 but made no hits.

Shortly after 19:00, the German cruiser Wiesbaden had become disabled by a shell from the British battlecruiser Invincible; KAdm Paul Behncke in König attempted to maneuver III Squadron to cover the stricken cruiser. Simultaneously, the British 3rd and 4th Light Cruiser Squadrons began a torpedo attack on the German line; while advancing to torpedo range, they smothered Wiesbaden with fire from their main guns. The eight III Squadron battleships fired on the British cruisers, but even sustained fire from the battleships' main guns failed to drive off the British cruisers. The armored cruisers Defence, Warrior, and Black Prince joined in the attack on the crippled Wiesbaden. Between 19:14 and 19:17, several German battleships and battlecruisers opened fire on Defence and Warrior. Instead of joining the fire on the much closer cruisers, Prinzregent Luitpold engaged the leading battleships of the British line, firing a total of 21 salvos. The gunners reported ranges of 17,500 to 18,800 yd (16,000 to 17,200 m), though this was an overestimation that caused the ship's salvos to fall past their intended target.

By 20:00, the German line was ordered to complete a 180-degree turn eastward to disengage from the British fleet. The maneuver, conducted under heavy fire, caused disorganization in the German fleet. Kaiserin had come too close to Prinzregent Luitpold and was forced to haul out of line to starboard to avoid a collision. Prinzregent Luitpold came up alongside Kaiserin at high speed, which forced Kaiserin to remain out of line temporarily. The turn reversed the order of the German line; Prinzregent Luitpold was now the eighth ship from the rear of the German line, leading III Squadron. At around 23:30, the German fleet reorganized into the night-cruising formation. Prinzregent Luitpold was the tenth ship, in the center of the 24-ship line.

After a series of night engagements between the leading battleships and British destroyers, the High Seas Fleet punched through the British light forces and reached Horns Reef by 04:00 on 1 June. The German fleet reached Wilhelmshaven a few hours later; the I Squadron battleships took up defensive positions in the outer roadstead, and Prinzregent Luitpold, Kaiserin, Kaiser, and Kronprinz stood ready just outside the entrance to Wilhelmshaven. The remainder of the battleships and battlecruisers entered Wilhelmshaven, where those that were still in fighting condition replenished their stocks of coal and ammunition. In the course of the battle, Prinzregent Luitpold fired one-hundred and sixty-nine 30.5 cm shells and one-hundred and six 15 cm rounds. She and her crew emerged from the battle completely unscathed.

==== Subsequent operations ====
In early August, Prinzregent Luitpold and the rest of the operational III Squadron units conducted divisional training in the Baltic. On 18 August, Scheer attempted a repeat of the 31 May operation; the two serviceable German battlecruisers—Moltke and Von der Tann—supported by three dreadnoughts, were to bombard the coastal town of Sunderland in an attempt to draw out and destroy Beatty's battlecruisers. The rest of the fleet, including Prinzregent Luitpold, would trail behind and provide cover. During the operation, Prinzregent Luitpold carried the Commander of U-boats. On the approach to the English coast during the action of 19 August 1916, Scheer turned north after receiving a false report from a zeppelin about a British unit in the area. As a result, the bombardment was not carried out, and by 14:35, Scheer had been warned of the Grand Fleet's approach and so turned his forces around and retreated to German ports.

The fleet advanced as far as the Dogger Bank on 19–20 October. The operation led to a brief action on 19 October, during which a British submarine torpedoed the cruiser München. The failure of the operation (coupled with the action of 19 August) convinced the German naval command to abandon its aggressive fleet strategy in favor of a resumption of the unrestricted submarine warfare campaign. Two weeks later, on 4 November, Prinzregent Luitpold took part in an expedition to the western coast of Denmark to assist two U-boats—U-20 and U-30—that had become stranded there. The fleet was reorganized on 1 December; the four König-class battleships remained in III Squadron, along with the newly commissioned Bayern, while the five Kaiser-class ships, including Prinzregent Luitpold, were transferred to IV Squadron. Prinzregent Luitpold became the flagship of the new squadron.

In the Wilhelmshaven Roads on 20 January 1917, the ship struck a steel hawser that became entangled in the ship's starboard propeller. In March, Friedrich der Grosse was replaced as the fleet flagship by the newly commissioned battleship Baden. Friedrich der Grosse in turn replaced Prinzregent Luitpold as the flagship of IV Squadron. Steadily decreasing morale and discontent with rations provoked a series of small mutinies in the fleet. On 6 June and 19 July, stokers protested the low quality of the food they were given, and on 2 August, some 800 men went on a hunger strike. The ship's officers relented and agreed to form a Menagekommission, a council that gave the enlisted men a voice in their ration selection and preparation. One of the ringleaders of the protests, however, was arrested and executed on 5 September.

==== Operation Albion ====
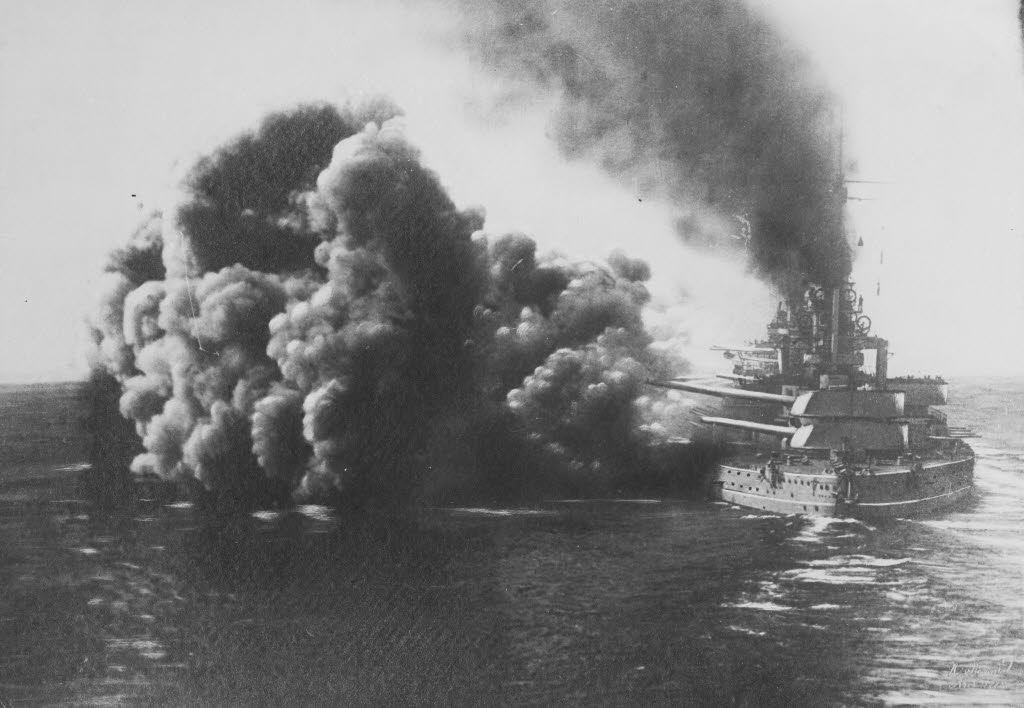
SMS Prinzregent Luitpold bombarding Ösel, October 1917

In early September 1917, following the German conquest of the Russian port of Riga, the German navy decided to eliminate the Russian naval forces that still held the Gulf of Riga. The Admiralstab (the Navy High Command) planned an operation to seize the Baltic island of Saaremaa (Ösel), and specifically the Russian gun batteries on the Sworbe Peninsula. On 18 September, the order was issued for a joint operation with the army to capture Ösel and Moon Islands; the primary naval component was to comprise the flagship, Moltke, along with III and IV Battle Squadrons of the High Seas Fleet. Along with nine light cruisers, three torpedo boat flotillas, and dozens of mine warfare ships, the entire force numbered some 300 ships, supported by over 100 aircraft and six zeppelins. The invasion force amounted to approximately 24,600 officers and enlisted men. Opposing the Germans were the old Russian pre-dreadnoughts Slava and Tsesarevich, the armored cruisers Bayan, Admiral Makarov, and Diana, 26 destroyers, and several torpedo boats and gunboats. The garrison on Ösel numbered some 14,000 men.

The operation began on the morning of 12 October, when Moltke and the III Squadron ships engaged Russian positions in Tagga Bay while Prinzregent Luitpold and the rest of IV Squadron shelled Russian gun batteries on the Sworbe Peninsula on Ösel. Prinzregent Luitpold, along with Kaiser and Kaiserin, were tasked with silencing the Russian guns at Hundsort which had taken Moltke under fire. The ships opened fire at 05:44, and by 07:45, Russian firing had ceased and German troops were moving ashore. Two days later, VAdm Wilhelm Souchon left Tagga Bay with Prinzregent Luitpold, Friedrich der Grosse, and Kaiserin to support German ground forces advancing on the Sworbe Peninsula. By 20 October, the fighting on the islands was winding down; Moon, Ösel, and Dagö were in German possession. The previous day, the Admiralstab had ordered the cessation of naval actions and the return of the dreadnoughts to the High Seas Fleet as soon as possible. On the 24th, Prinzregent Luitpold was detached from the task force and returned to Kiel.

==== Final operations ====
After arriving in Kiel, Prinzregent Luitpold went into drydock for periodic maintenance, from which she emerged on 21 December. She then proceeded on to Wilhelmshaven, where she resumed guard duty in the Bight. On 17 March 1918, the ship steamed to the Baltic for training exercises, and the following day the battlecruiser Derfflinger rammed her outside Kiel. The accident caused no serious damage, however.

In late 1917, light forces of the High Seas Fleet began interdicting British convoys to Norway, which prompted the British to detach battleships from the battle fleet to protect the convoys. The Germans were now presented with an opportunity for which they had been waiting the entire war: a portion of the Grand Fleet could be isolated and destroyed. Hipper planned the operation: the battlecruisers of I Scouting Group, along with light cruisers and destroyers, would attack one of the large convoys, while the rest of the High Seas Fleet would stand by, ready to attack the British battleship squadron. At 05:00 on 23 April 1918, Prinzregent Luitpold and the rest of the fleet departed from the Schillig roadstead. Hipper ordered wireless transmissions be kept to a minimum, to prevent radio intercepts by British intelligence. At 06:10 the German battlecruisers had reached a position approximately 60 kilometers (37 mi) southwest of Bergen when Moltke lost her inner starboard propeller, which severely damaged the ship's engines. Despite this setback, Hipper continued northward. By 14:00, Hipper's force had crossed the convoy route several times but had found nothing. At 14:10, Hipper turned his ships southward. By 18:37, the German fleet had made it back to the defensive minefields surrounding their bases. It was later discovered that the convoy had left port a day later than expected by the German planning staff.

Prinzregent Luitpold thereafter resumed guard duties in the German Bight. IV Squadron undertook another training exercise in the Baltic from 18 June to 13 August. A final round of drills took place on 22–28 October.

==== Fate ====
Map of the scuttled ships showing Prinzregent Luitpold (#17); click for a larger view

Prinzregent Luitpold and her four sisters were to have taken part in a final fleet action at the end of October 1918, days before the Armistice was to take effect. The bulk of the High Seas Fleet was to have sortied from their base in Wilhelmshaven to engage the British Grand Fleet; Scheer—by now the Grand Admiral (Großadmiral) of the fleet—intended to inflict as much damage as possible on the British navy, to improve Germany's bargaining position, despite the expected casualties. But many of the war-weary sailors felt that the operation would disrupt the peace process and prolong the war. On the morning of 29 October 1918, the order was given to sail from Wilhelmshaven the following day. Starting on the night of 29 October, sailors on Thüringen and then on several other battleships mutinied. The unrest ultimately forced Hipper and Scheer to cancel the operation. Informed of the situation, the Kaiser stated "I no longer have a navy".

In early November 1918, Germany agreed to surrender according to terms laid out in the Armistice of 11 November 1918; one of the clauses of the agreement stipulated that the bulk of the High Seas Fleet must be interned while negotiations for the eventual peace treaty were held. After proposals to send the fleet to Norway or Spain failed, the Allies settled on the British naval base at Scapa Flow. Prinzregent Luitpold was among the list of ships to be interned. The fleet was commanded by KAdm Ludwig von Reuter. Prior to the departure of the German fleet, Admiral Adolf von Trotha made clear to Reuter that he could not allow the Allies to seize the ships under any conditions.

On 21 November, the fleet rendezvoused with the British light cruiser Cardiff, which led the ships to the Allied fleet that was to escort the Germans to Scapa Flow. The Allied fleet consisted of some 370 British, American, and French warships. The Germans initially sailed to the Firth of Forth, and from there, proceeded in smaller groups to Scapa Flow. Once the ships were interned, their guns were disabled through the removal of their breech blocks, and their crews were reduced to 200 officers and enlisted men. The fleet remained in captivity during the negotiations that ultimately produced the Versailles Treaty.

Reuter believed that the British intended to seize the German ships on 21 June 1919, which was the deadline for Germany to have signed the peace treaty. Unaware that the deadline had been extended to the 23rd, Reuter ordered the ships to be sunk at the next opportunity. On the morning of 21 June, the British fleet left Scapa Flow to conduct training maneuvers, and at 11:20 Reuter transmitted the order to his ships. Prinzregent Luitpold sank at 13:30.

The wreck was sold to Cox & Danks Shipbreaking Co. on 25 June 1929, and they subsequently raised Prinzregent Luitpold on 9 July 1931. They beached the ship on Cava Island to avoid her sinking again, and eventually re-sold the ship to Metal Industries, Limited in February 1933. The ship was towed to Rosyth on 11 May that year, and breaking up began almost immediately on 13 June. The work lasted until 14 March 1934. As with several other vessels, Prinzregent Luitpold arrived in Rosyth upside-down, having capsized in the scuttling.
