= SMS Kaiserin =

Battleship of the German Imperial Navy

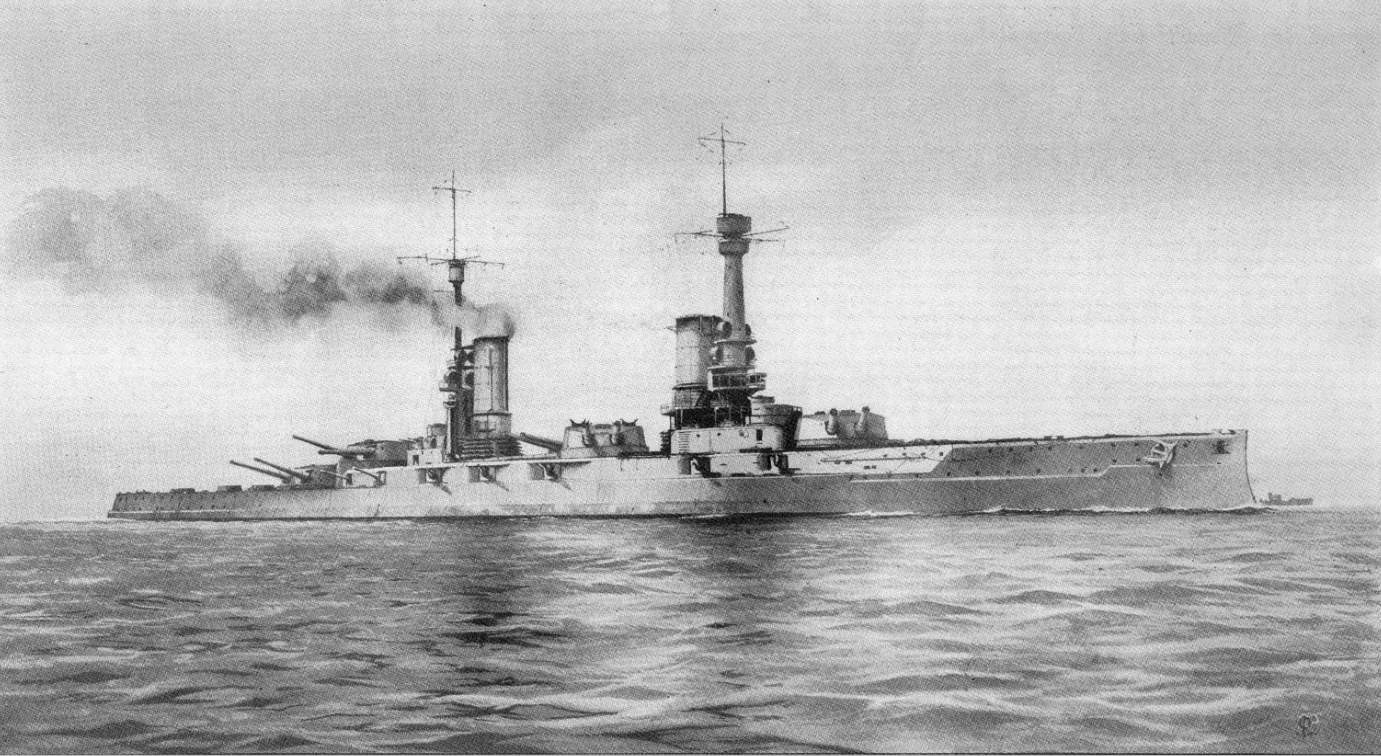
- Recognition drawing of a Kaiser-class battleship (Note: The foremast illustrated here is the heavy tubular type fitted only to Kaiser and Friedrich der Grosse. Kaiserin was equipped with a standard pole mast. See Gröner, p. 26.)

History

German Empire
- Name: Kaiserin
- Namesake: Empress Augusta Victoria
- Builder: Howaldtswerke, Kiel
- Laid down: November 1910
- Launched: 11 November 1911
- Commissioned: 14 May 1913
- Fate: Scuttled at Gutter Sound, 21 June 1919
- Notes: Raised and scrapped, 1936

General characteristics
- Class & type: Kaiser-class battleship
- Displacement: Normal: 24,724 t (24,334 long tons); Full load: 27,000 t (27,000 long tons)
- Length: 172.40 m (565 ft 7 in)
- Beam: 29 m (95 ft 2 in)
- Draft: 9.10 m (29 ft 10 in)
- Installed power: 16 × water-tube boilers; 27,617 shp (20,594 kW)
- Propulsion: 3 × steam turbines; 3 × propellers
- Speed: 22.1 knots (40.9 km/h; 25.4 mph)
- Range: 7,900 nmi (14,600 km; 9,100 mi) at 12 knots (22 km/h; 14 mph)
- Complement: 41 officers; 1,043 enlisted
- Armament: 10 × 30.5 cm (12 in) SK L/50 guns; 14 × 15 cm (5.9 in) SK L/45 guns; 12 × 8.8 cm (3.5 in) SK L/45 guns; 5 × 50 cm (19.7 in) torpedo tubes
- Armor: Belt 350 mm (13.8 in); Conning tower: 400 mm (15.7 in); Turrets: 300 mm (11.8 in)

SMS Kaiserin (Note: "SMS" stands for "Seiner Majestät Schiff" (German: His Majesty's Ship).) was the third vessel of the Kaiser class of dreadnought battleships of the Imperial German Navy. Kaiserin's keel was laid in November 1910 at the Howaldtswerke dockyard in Kiel. She was launched on 11 November 1911 and was commissioned into the fleet on 14 May 1913. The ship was equipped with ten 30.5-centimeter (12 in) guns in five twin turrets, and had a top speed of 22.1 knots (40.9 km/h; 25.4 mph). Kaiserin was assigned to III Battle Squadron and later IV Battle Squadron of the High Seas Fleet for the majority of her career, including World War I.

Along with her four sister ships, Kaiser, Friedrich der Grosse, König Albert, and Prinzregent Luitpold, Kaiserin participated in all of the major fleet operations of World War I, including the Battle of Jutland on 31 May and 1 June 1916. The ship was also involved in Operation Albion, an amphibious assault on the Russian-held islands in the Gulf of Riga, in October 1917. She later saw action during the Second Battle of Heligoland Bight in November 1917.

After Germany's defeat in the war and the signing of the Armistice in November 1918, the Royal Navy interned Kaiserin and most of the capital ships of the High Seas Fleet in Scapa Flow. The ships were disarmed and reduced to skeleton crews while the Allied powers negotiated the final version of the Treaty of Versailles. On 21 June 1919, the commander of the interned fleet, Rear Admiral Ludwig von Reuter, ordered the fleet to be scuttled to ensure that the British would not be able to seize the ships. Kaiserin was raised in May 1936 and subsequently broken up for scrap.

== Design ==
The German 1909 construction program included the last two members of the Helgoland-class battleships, along with two additional dreadnoughts to be built to a new design. The primary change was intended to be the adoption of steam turbines in favor of triple-expansion steam engines used in the earlier vessels. The space savings of turbines permitted a more efficient superfiring arrangement of the main battery, along the same model as the Moltke-class battlecruisers. The new ships' armor layout was significant improved over earlier designs; the Kaiser class was also far superior in defensive characteristics to their British counterparts of the King George V and Iron Duke classes, even if markedly inferior in terms of firepower.

=== Characteristics ===
Plan and profile drawing of the Kaiser class

The ship was 172.4 m (565 ft 7 in) long overall and displaced a maximum of 27,000 metric tons (27,000 long tons) at full load. She had a beam of 29 m (95 ft 2 in) and a draft of 9.1 m (29 ft 10 in) forward and 8.80 m (28 ft 10 in) aft. The ship had an inverted bow and a long forecastle deck that extended for two-thirds the length of the hull. Her superstructure was fairly minimal, consisting primarily of a short, armored conning tower forward and a smaller, secondary conning tower aft. Kaiserin was fitted with a pair of pole masts for observation and signaling purposes. She had a crew of 41 officers and 1,043 enlisted men.

Kaiserin was powered by three sets of Parsons steam turbines, which drove three screw propellers. The turbines were supplied with steam by sixteen coal-fired water-tube boilers that were vented through a pair of widely spaced funnels. The powerplant produced a top speed of 22.1 knots (40.9 km/h; 25.4 mph). She carried 3,600 metric tons (3,500 long tons; 4,000 short tons) of coal, which enabled a maximum range of 7,900 nautical miles (14,600 km; 9,100 mi) at a cruising speed of 12 knots (22 km/h; 14 mph).

Kaiserin was armed with a main battery of ten 30.5 cm SK L/50 guns in five twin turrets. (Note: In Imperial German Navy gun nomenclature, "SK" (Schnelladekanone) denotes that the gun is quick loading, while the L/50 denotes the length of the gun. In this case, the L/50 gun is 50 calibers, meaning that the gun is 45 times as long as it is in bore diameter.) The ship dispensed with the inefficient hexagonal turret arrangement of previous German battleships; instead, three of the five turrets were mounted on the centerline, with two of them arranged in a superfiring pair aft. The other two turrets were placed en echelon amidships, such that both could fire on the broadside. (Note: The hexagonal arrangement was inefficient, as the main battery of twelve guns was limited to a broadside of eight guns. See Hore, p. 67. Kaiserin's broadside was two guns heavier, despite the fact that she carried two fewer guns than the ships of the Helgoland class. See Hore, p. 69.) The ship was also armed with a secondary battery of fourteen 15 cm SK L/45 guns in casemates amidships. For close-range defense against torpedo boats, she carried eight 8.8 cm (3.5 in) SK L/45 guns in casemates. The ship was also armed with four 8.8 cm L/45 anti-aircraft guns. The ship's armament was rounded out by five 50 cm (19.7 in) torpedo tubes, all mounted in the hull; one was in the bow, and the other four were on the broadside.

Her main armored belt was 350 mm (13.8 in) thick in the central citadel, and was composed of Krupp cemented armor (KCA). Her main battery gun turrets were protected by 300 mm (11.8 in) of KCA on the sides and faces. Kaiserin's conning tower was heavily armored, with 400 mm (15.7 in) sides.

== Service history ==
Ordered under the contract name Ersatz Hagen as a replacement for the obsolete coastal defense ship Hagen, (Note: German warships were ordered under provisional names. Additions to the fleet were given a single letter; ships intended to replace older or lost vessels were ordered as "Ersatz (name of the ship to be replaced)".) Kaiserin was laid down at the Howaldtswerke dockyard in Kiel in November 1910. She was launched on 11 November 1911, after which fitting-out work was completed. At the launching ceremony, Admiral Hans von Koester gave a speech and Princess Victoria Louise christened the ship. A dockyard crew delivered the ship to the Navy on 13 May 1913; she was commissioned into the fleet the following day, and she was assigned to V Division, III Battle Squadron, to replace the old battleship Elsass. During trials the ship's turbine engines were damaged, and Kaiserin did not join the fleet until 13 December due to the necessary repairs. Kapitän zur See (KzS—Captain at Sea) Her first commander was Karl Sievers.

After joining III Squadron, Kaiserin participated in the routine fleet training exercises. Squadron exercises were conducted in February, followed by fleet maneuvers, both in the North Sea. The fleet trained again in May, in both the North and Baltic Seas. Kaiserin left Germany on 7 July for the annual summer cruise to Norway, but was recalled prematurely on 22 July because of rising international tensions following the assassination of Archduke Franz Ferdinand. Upon returning to Germany, Kaiserin steamed to Brunsbüttel on 24 July, where she was the first battleship to traverse the recently deepened Kaiser Wilhelm Canal. The test was carried out to determine if the new depth was sufficient for the largest battleships, which had particular importance given the rapidly increasing tensions in Europe. The voyage required lightening, and in just under twelve hours Kaiserin exited the locks at Holtenau in Kiel where she met the rest of her squadron. On 31 July, the entire squadron returned to the North Sea via the Canal. Following the outbreak of war on 28 July and the subsequent German invasion of Belgium and France, the United Kingdom declared war on Germany at midnight on 4 August.

=== World War I ===
Kaiserin was present during the first sortie by the German fleet into the North Sea, which took place on 2–3 November 1914. No British forces were encountered during the operation. A second operation followed on 15–16 December. This sortie was the initiation of a strategy adopted by Admiral Friedrich von Ingenohl, the commander of the High Seas Fleet. Ingenohl intended to use the battlecruisers of Konteradmiral (KAdm—Rear Admiral) Franz von Hipper's I Scouting Group to raid British coastal towns to lure out portions of the Grand Fleet where they could be destroyed by the High Seas Fleet. Early on 15 December the fleet left port to raid the towns of Scarborough, Hartlepool, and Whitby. That evening, the German battle fleet of some twelve dreadnoughts—including Kaiserin and her four sisters—and eight pre-dreadnoughts came to within 10 nmi (19 km; 12 mi) of an isolated squadron of six British battleships. However, skirmishes between the rival destroyer screens in the darkness convinced Ingenohl that he was faced with the entire Grand Fleet. Under orders from Kaiser Wilhelm II to avoid risking the fleet unnecessarily, Ingenohl broke off the engagement and turned the battle fleet back toward Germany.

Kaiserin went into the Baltic for squadron training from 23 to 29 January 1915. Upon returning to the North Sea, the ship went into drydock in Wilhelmshaven for periodic maintenance, which lasted from 31 January to 20 February. The Kaiser removed Ingenohl from his post on 2 February, following the loss of SMS Blücher at the Battle of Dogger Bank the month before. Admiral Hugo von Pohl succeeded him as the commander of the fleet. Pohl continued the policy of sweeps into the North Sea to destroy isolated British formations. The fleet conducted a series of advances into the North Sea throughout 1915; Kaiserin was present for the sweeps on 17 to 18 May, 29 to 30 May, 10 August, 11 to 12 September, and 23 to 24 October. III Squadron completed the year with another round of unit training in the Baltic from 5 to 20 December.

Pohl's tenure as fleet commander was brief; by January 1916 hepatic cancer had weakened him to the point where he was no longer able to carry out his duties. He was replaced by Vizeadmiral (VAdm—Vice Admiral) Reinhard Scheer in January. Scheer proposed a more aggressive policy designed to force a confrontation with the British Grand Fleet; he received approval from the Kaiser in February. The first of Scheer's operations was conducted the following month, on 5 to 7 March, with an uneventful sweep of the Hoofden. Kaiserin was also present during an advance to the Amrun Bank on 2 to 3 April. The fleet conducted another sortie on 21 to 22 April.

==== Battle of Jutland ====
Maps showing the maneuvers of the British (blue) and German (red) fleets on 31 May – 1 June 1916

Kaiserin was present during the fleet operation that resulted in the battle of Jutland which took place on 31 May and 1 June 1916. The German fleet again sought to draw out and isolate a portion of the Grand Fleet and destroy it before the main British fleet could retaliate. During the operation, Kaiserin was the second ship in VI Division of III Squadron and the seventh ship in the line, directly astern of Kaiser and ahead of Prinzregent Luitpold. VI Division was behind only V Division, consisting of the four König-class battleships. The eight battleships of the Helgoland- and Nassau classes assigned to I and II Divisions in I Squadron followed VI Division. The six elderly pre-dreadnoughts of III and IV Divisions, II Battle Squadron, formed the rear of the formation. (Note: German units are typically denoted by Roman numerals, while British units are typically denoted with Arabic numerals.)

Shortly before 16:00, the battlecruisers of I Scouting Group encountered the British 1st Battlecruiser Squadron under the command of Vice Admiral David Beatty. The opposing ships began an artillery duel that saw the destruction of Indefatigable, shortly after 17:00, and Queen Mary, less than half an hour later. At 16:19, Kaiserin was forced to temporarily stop the turbine on the center shaft, as the condenser had started leaking. The crew were able to restart the engine before Kaiserin came into action. By this time, the German battlecruisers were steaming south to draw the British ships toward the main body of the High Seas Fleet. At 17:30, the crew of the leading German battleship, König, spotted both I Scouting Group and the 1st Battlecruiser Squadron approaching. The German battlecruisers were steaming to starboard, while the British ships steamed to port. At 17:45, Scheer ordered a two-point turn to port to bring his ships closer to the British battlecruisers, and a minute later, the order to open fire was given. (Note: The compass can be divided into 32 points, each corresponding to 11.25 degrees. A two-point turn to port would alter the ships' course by 22.5 degrees.)

At approximately 17:40, the British light cruiser Nottingham fired a single torpedo at Kaiserin at the extreme range of at least 16,500 yd (15,100 m), which failed to find its target. After Scheer ordered the fleet to open fire, Kaiserin briefly engaged the battlecruiser New Zealand; Kaiserin failed to score a hit and by 17:54 New Zealand and the rest of the British battlecruisers had increased speed and moved out of range. The British destroyers Nestor and Nomad, which had been disabled earlier in the engagement, lay directly in the path of the advancing High Seas Fleet. Kaiserin and her three sisters fired on Nomad with their secondary guns while the I Squadron battleships dispatched Nestor. At around 19:00, the German battle line came into contact with the 2nd Light Cruiser Squadron; Kaiserin fired three salvos from her main battery at an unidentified four-funneled cruiser but made no hits.

Shortly after 19:00, a shell from the British battlecruiser Invincible disabled the German cruiser Wiesbaden; KAdm Paul Behncke in König attempted to maneuver III Squadron to cover the stricken cruiser.= Simultaneously, the British 3rd and 4th Light Cruiser Squadrons began a torpedo attack on the German line; while advancing to torpedo range, they smothered Wiesbaden with fire from their main guns. The eight III Squadron battleships fired on the British cruisers, but even sustained fire from the battleships' main guns failed to drive off the British cruisers. The armored cruisers Defence, Warrior, and Black Prince joined in the attack on the crippled Wiesbaden. Between 19:14 and 19:17, several German battleships and battlecruisers opened fire on Defence and Warrior. Kaiserin initially engaged one of the battleships in the British 5th Battle Squadron and scored a hit; according to Kaiserin's logs, the ship in question was Malaya. After three minutes firing at Malaya, Kaiserin shifted fire to Defence. In short succession, the German dreadnoughts hit Defence with several heavy caliber shells. One salvo penetrated the ship's ammunition magazines and, in a tremendous explosion, destroyed the cruiser. After Defence exploded, Kaiserin shifted her fire to a target believed to be the battlecruiser Tiger. Heavy haze forced Kaiserin to check fire after two salvos.

By 20:00, Scheer ordered the German line to complete a 180-degree turn eastward to disengage from the British fleet. The maneuver, conducted under heavy fire, caused disorganization in the German fleet. Kaiserin had come too close to Prinzregent Luitpold and was forced to haul out of line to starboard to avoid a collision. The latter vessel came up alongside Kaiserin at high speed. As a result, Kaiserin had to remain out of line and could not return to her assigned position. The turn reversed the order of the German line; Kaiserin was now the seventh ship from the rear of the German line. At around 23:30, the German fleet reorganized into the night cruising formation. Kaiserin was the eleventh ship, in the center of the 24-ship line.

After a series of night engagements between the leading battleships and British destroyers, the High Seas Fleet punched through the British light forces and reached Horns Reef by 04:00 on 1 June. The German fleet reached Wilhelmshaven a few hours later; the I Squadron battleships took up defensive positions in the outer roadstead and Kaiserin, Kaiser, Prinzregent Luitpold, and Kronprinz stood ready just outside the entrance to Wilhelmshaven. The remainder of the battleships and battlecruisers entered Wilhelmshaven, where those that were still in fighting condition replenished their stocks of coal and ammunition. In the course of the battle, Kaiserin fired one-hundred and sixty 30.5 cm shells and one-hundred and thirty-five 15 cm rounds. She emerged from the battle completely unscathed.

==== Subsequent operations ====
In early August, Kaiserin and the rest of the operational III Squadron units conducted divisional training in the Baltic. On 18 August, Scheer attempted a repeat of the 31 May operation; the two serviceable German battlecruisers—Moltke and Von der Tann—supported by three dreadnoughts, were to bombard the coastal town of Sunderland in an attempt to draw out and destroy Beatty's battlecruisers. The rest of the fleet, including Kaiserin, would trail behind and provide cover. On the approach to the English coast during the action of 19 August 1916, Scheer turned north after receiving a false report from a zeppelin about a British unit in the area. As a result, the bombardment was not carried out, and by 14:35, Scheer had been warned of the Grand Fleet's approach and so turned his forces around and retreated to German ports.

The fleet advanced as far as the Dogger Bank on 19–20 October. The operation led to a brief action on 19 October, during which a British submarine torpedoed the cruiser München. The failure of the operation (coupled with the action of 19 August) convinced the German naval command to abandon its aggressive fleet strategy in favor of a resumption of the unrestricted submarine warfare campaign. Two weeks later, on 4 November, Kaiserin took part in an expedition to the western coast of Denmark to assist two U-boats, U-20 and U-30, that had become stranded there. The fleet was reorganized on 1 December; the four König-class battleships remained in III Squadron, along with the newly commissioned Bayern, while the five Kaiser-class ships, including Kaiserin, were transferred to IV Squadron.

While transiting the Kaiser Wilhelm Canal on 14 March 1917, Kaiserin became grounded. One of her bilge keels was damaged and some 280 t (280 long tons; 310 short tons) of water entered the ship. Repairs were conducted at the Imperial Dockyard in Kiel from 15 to 18 March. Kaiserin returned to the North Sea on 30 March and remained there on guard duty until 8 June. On 9 June, she went to the Baltic for a month-long series of exercises, which were completed on 2 July. She resumed guard duties in the German Bight on 3 July and that month, KzS Kurt Graßhoff arrived to relieve Sievers as the ship's commander. Kaiserin continued in this role until 11 September, when she was detached to join the special unit assigned to Operation Albion.

==== Operation Albion ====
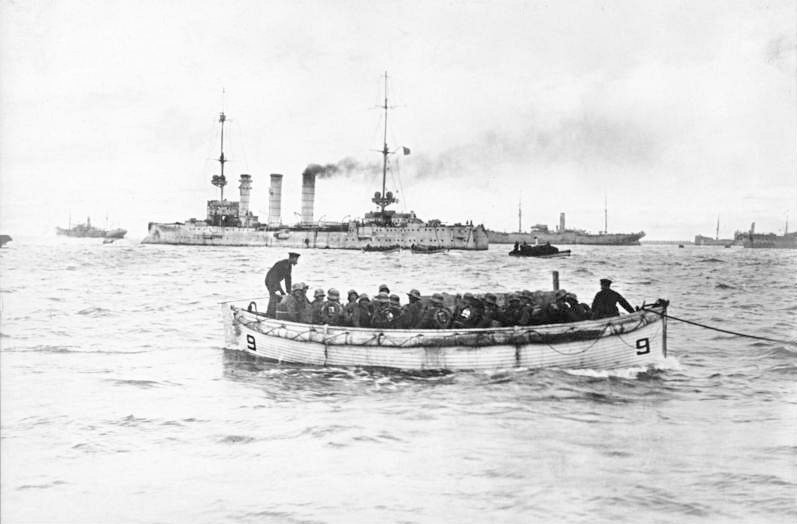
German troops landing at Ösel, October 1917

In early September 1917, following the German conquest of the Russian port of Riga, the German navy decided to eliminate the Russian naval forces that still held the Gulf of Riga. The Admiralstab (the Navy High Command) planned an operation to seize the Baltic island of Ösel, and specifically the Russian gun batteries on the Sworbe Peninsula. On 18 September, the order was issued for a joint operation with the army to capture Ösel and Moon Islands; the primary naval component was to comprise the flagship, Moltke, along with III and IV Battle Squadrons of the High Seas Fleet. Along with nine light cruisers, three torpedo boat flotillas, and dozens of mine warfare ships, the entire force numbered some 300 ships, supported by over 100 aircraft and six zeppelins. The invasion force amounted to approximately 24,600 officers and enlisted men. By this time, IV Battle Squadron had come under the command of VAdm Wilhelm Souchon. Opposing the Germans were the old Russian pre-dreadnoughts Slava and Tsesarevich, the armored cruisers Bayan, Admiral Makarov, and Diana, 26 destroyers, and several torpedo boats and gunboats. The garrison on Ösel numbered some 14,000 men.

The operation began on the morning of 12 October, when Moltke and the III Squadron ships engaged Russian positions in Tagga Bay while Kaiserin and the rest of IV Squadron shelled Russian gun batteries on the Sworbe Peninsula on Ösel. Kaiserin, along with Kaiser and Prinzregent Luitpold, were tasked with silencing the Russian guns at Hundsort on Ösel, which had taken Moltke under fire. The ships opened fire at 05:44, and by 07:45, Russian firing had ceased and German troops were moving ashore. Two days later, Souchon left Tagga Bay with Kaiserin, Friedrich der Grosse, and Prinzregent Luitpold to support German ground forces advancing on the Sworbe Peninsula. Kaiserin was assigned to suppress a Russian battery at Zerel, though heavy fog delayed her from engaging her target. The Russians opened fire first, which was quickly returned by Kaiserin and König Albert. Friedrich der Grosse came to the two ships' assistance; the three battleships fired a total of 120 large-caliber shells over the span of an hour. The fourth Russian salvo straddled Kaiserin, which began to steer erratically to avoid the Russian gunfire. The heavy firing prompted most of the Russian gun crews to flee their posts.

On the night of 15 October, Kaiserin and König Albert were sent to replenish their coal stocks in Putzig. On the 19th, they were briefly joined in Putzig by Friedrich der Grosse, which continued on to Arensburg with Moltke. The next morning, VAdm Ehrhard Schmidt ordered the special naval unit to be dissolved and returned to the North Sea. In a communique to the naval headquarters, Schmidt noted that "Kaiserin and König Albert can immediately be detached from Putzig to the North Sea." The two ships then proceeded to Kiel via Danzig; after reaching Kiel, they transited the Kaiser Wilhelm Canal back to the North Sea.

==== Final operations ====
On 17 November 1917, Kaiserin and Kaiser were assigned to provide cover for II Scouting Group while it conducted a minesweeping operation in the North Sea. Significant British forces, including five battlecruisers and several light cruisers, attacked II Scouting Group; the two battleships immediately steamed to their assistance. In the ensuing Second Battle of Heligoland Bight, Kaiserin scored a hit on the light cruiser Caledon. The battlecruiser Repulse briefly engaged the German dreadnoughts, but both forces withdrew. After the action, KAdm Ludwig von Reuter criticized Graßhoff for lagging too far behind the minesweepers to provide adequate protection. He was subsequently relieved of command of the ship in December. Kaiserin went into drydock for maintenance on 22 December, and work lasted until 5 February 1918. During this period, in January, KzS Walter Hildebrand arrived to take command of the ship, though he was replaced later that month by KzS Wilhelm Adelung.

In late 1917, light forces of the High Seas Fleet began interdicting British convoys to Norway, which prompted the British to detach battleships from the battle fleet to protect the convoys. The Germans were now presented with an opportunity for which they had been waiting the entire war: a portion of the Grand Fleet could be isolated and destroyed. Hipper planned the operation: the battlecruisers of I Scouting Group, along with light cruisers and destroyers, would attack one of the large convoys, while the rest of the High Seas Fleet would stand by, ready to attack the British battleship squadron. At 05:00 on 23 April 1918, Kaiserin and the rest of the fleet departed from the Schillig roadstead. Hipper ordered wireless transmissions be kept to a minimum, to prevent radio intercepts by British intelligence. At 06:10 the German battlecruisers had reached a position approximately 60 kilometers (37 mi) southwest of Bergen when Moltke lost her inner starboard propeller, which severely damaged the ship's engines. Despite this setback, Hipper continued northward. By 14:00, Hipper's force had crossed the convoy route several times but had found nothing. At 14:10, Hipper turned his ships southward. By 18:37, the German fleet had made it back to the defensive minefields surrounding their bases. It was later discovered that the convoy had left port a day later than expected by the German planning staff.

After returning to port, she resumed guard duties in the German Bight. IV Squadron undertook another training exercise in the Baltic from 18 June to 10 July. In early September, Kaiserin was briefly drydocked for periodic maintenance. A final round of drills took place on 22–28 October.

==== Fate ====
Map of the scuttled ships showing Kaiserin (#16); click for a larger view

Kaiserin and her four sisters were to have taken part in a final fleet action at the end of October 1918, days before the Armistice was to take effect. The bulk of the High Seas Fleet was to have sortied from its base in Wilhelmshaven to engage the British Grand Fleet; Scheer—by now the Grand Admiral (Großadmiral) of the fleet—intended to inflict as much damage as possible on the British navy. The goal was to improve Germany's bargaining position in the imminent peace negotiations, despite the expected casualties. But many of the war-weary sailors felt that the operation would disrupt the peace process and prolong the war. On the morning of 29 October 1918, the order was given to sail from Wilhelmshaven the following day. Starting on the night of 29 October, sailors on Thüringen and then on several other battleships mutinied. The unrest ultimately forced Hipper and Scheer to cancel the operation. Informed of the situation, the Kaiser stated, "I no longer have a navy."

In early November 1918, Germany agreed to surrender according to terms laid out in the Armistice of 11 November 1918; one of the clauses of the agreement stipulated that the bulk of the High Seas Fleet must be interned while negotiations for the eventual peace treaty were held. After proposals to send the fleet to Norway or Spain failed, the Allies settled on the British naval base at Scapa Flow. Kaiserin was among the list of ships to be interned. The fleet was commanded by KAdm Ludwig von Reuter. Prior to the departure of the German fleet, Admiral Adolf von Trotha made clear to Reuter that he could not allow the Allies to seize the ships under any conditions.

On 21 November, the fleet rendezvoused with the British light cruiser Cardiff, which led the ships to the Allied fleet that was to escort the Germans to Scapa Flow. The Allied fleet consisted of some 370 British, American, and French warships. The Germans initially sailed to the Firth of Forth, and from there, proceeded in smaller groups to Scapa Flow. Once the ships were interned, their guns were disabled through the removal of their breech blocks, and their crews were reduced to 200 officers and enlisted men. The fleet remained in captivity during the negotiations that ultimately produced the Versailles Treaty.

The fleet remained in captivity during the negotiations that ultimately produced the Treaty of Versailles. Reuter believed that the British intended to seize the German ships on 21 June 1919, which was the deadline for Germany to have signed the peace treaty. Unaware that the deadline had been extended to the 23rd, Reuter ordered the ships to be sunk at the next opportunity. On the morning of 21 June, the British fleet left Scapa Flow to conduct training maneuvers, and at 11:20 Reuter transmitted the order to his ships. Kaiserin sank at 14:00; she was subsequently sold to Metal Industries, Limited on 1 November 1934, and was raised on 14 May 1936. The ship was then towed to Rosyth, Britain, and broken up for scrap between 18 November 1936 and 13 December 1937.
