= HMS Nomad =

Admiralty M-class destroyer

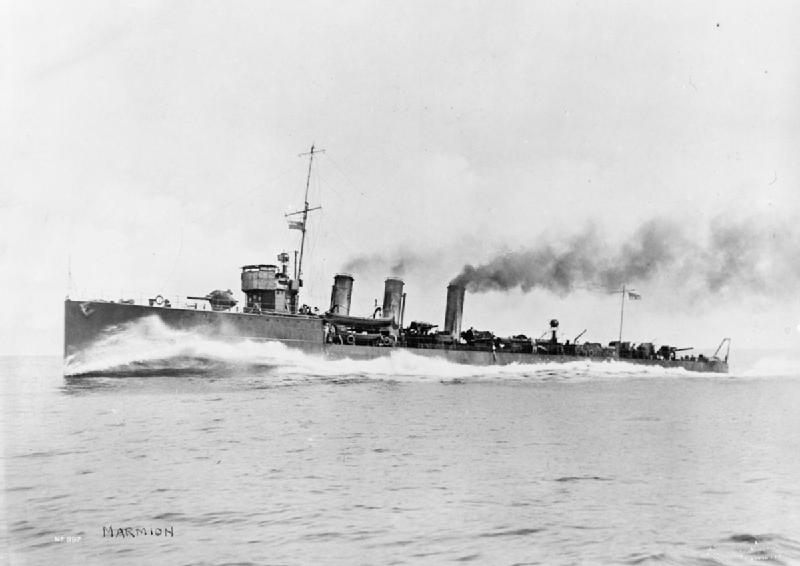
- Nomad's sister ship HMS Marmion c. 1916

History

United Kingdom
- Name: HMS Nomad
- Builder: Alexander Stephen and Sons, Linthouse
- Launched: 7 February 1916
- Fate: Sunk on 31 May 1916

General characteristics
- Class & type: Admiralty M-class destroyer
- Displacement: 971 long tons (987 t)
- Length: 273 ft 4 in (83.31 m) o/a
- Beam: 26 ft 8 in (8.13 m)
- Draught: 9 ft 8 in (2.95 m)
- Installed power: 25,000 shp (19,000 kW); 4 × Yarrow boilers
- Propulsion: 3 Shafts; 3 steam turbines
- Speed: 34 knots (63 km/h; 39 mph)
- Range: 2,100 nmi (3,900 km; 2,400 mi) at 15 knots (28 km/h; 17 mph)
- Complement: 76
- Armament: 3 × QF 4-inch (102 mm) Mark IV guns; 2 × QF 1.5-pounder (37 mm) or QF 2-pounder (40 mm) "pom-pom" anti-aircraft guns; 2 × twin 21-inch (533 mm) torpedo tubes

HMS Nomad was an Admiralty M-class destroyer built for the Royal Navy during the First World War. She was sunk during the Battle of Jutland in 1916.

== Description ==
The Admiralty M class were improved and faster versions of the preceding Laforey-class destroyer. They displaced 971 long tons (987 t). The ships had an overall length of 273 feet 4 inches (83.3 m), a beam of 26 feet 8 inches (8.1 m) and a draught of 9 feet 8 inches (2.9 m). They were powered by three Parsons direct-drive steam turbines, each driving one propeller shaft, using steam provided by four Yarrow boilers. The turbines developed a total of 25,000 shaft horsepower (19,000 kW) and gave a maximum speed of 34 knots (63 km/h; 39 mph). The ships carried a maximum of 237 long tons (241 t) of fuel oil that gave them a range of 2,100 nautical miles (3,900 km; 2,400 mi) at 15 knots (28 km/h; 17 mph). The ships' complement was 76 officers and ratings.

The ships were armed with three single QF 4-inch (102 mm) Mark IV guns and two QF 1.5-pounder (37 mm) anti-aircraft guns. These latter guns were later replaced by a pair of QF 2-pounder (40 mm) "pom-pom" anti-aircraft guns. The ships were also fitted with two above water twin mounts for 21-inch (533 mm) torpedoes.

== Construction and service ==
Nomad was ordered under the Third War Programme in November 1914 and built by Alexander Stephen and Sons at their shipyard in Linthouse. The ship was launched on 7 February 1916 and completed in April 1916. She was commissioned under the command of Lieutenant-Commander Paul Whitfield and briefly served in the 13th Destroyer Flotilla of the Grand Fleet.

Nomad was part of the 13th Destroyer Flotilla at the Battle of Jutland on 31 May 1916. At 16:09 hr, Admiral Jellicoe commander of the Grand Fleet ordered the 13th Flotilla to launch a torpedo attack against German battlecruisers, while at almost the same time, Admiral Hipper, commander of the German battlecruisers, ordered a torpedo attack on British battlecruisers by the German 9th Flotilla. The two destroyer forces became involved in an intense engagement, during which Nomad was disabled by a shell hit in her engine room. Two torpedoes fired by the German destroyers at Nestor failed to strike, passing under the British destroyer. Later that afternoon, Nomad, together with sister ship Nestor, also immobilised in the earlier attack, was engaged by German battleships. Nomad launched all her torpedoes at the German ships, but failed to score a hit, while the German battleships Friedrich der Grosse, Prinzregent Luitpold, Kaiser and Kaiserin fired at Nomad with their secondary armament. She was heavily hit, with the damage forcing her crew to abandon ship, while a final hit caused Nomad's forward magazine to explode, the destroyer sinking at 17:30 hr, with Nestor sinking shortly afterwards. Eight of Nomad's crew were killed while 72 survivors (including Whitfield) were rescued from the sea by German torpedo boats and became prisoners-of-war.

The wreck is designated as a protected place under the Protection of Military Remains Act 1986. The wreck of Nomad was found by accident in 2001 by a dive team including marine archaeologist Innes McCartney. The ship's bell can be seen on display at the Jutland shipwreck museum.

== Popular culture ==
She was depicted in a book called Prisoner of War, by Martin Booth, serving as the protagonist's ship.

== Bibliography ==
- Campbell, John (1998). Jutland: An Analysis of the Fighting. London: Conway Maritime Press. ISBN 0-85177-750-3.
- Colledge, J. J.; Warlow, Ben (2006) [1969]. Ships of the Royal Navy: The Complete Record of All Fighting Ships of the Royal Navy from the 15th Century to the Present (3rd Rev ed.). London: Chatham Publishing. ISBN 978-1-86176-281-8. OCLC 67375475.
- Dittmar, F.J. & Colledge, J.J. (1972). British Warships 1914–1919. Shepperton, UK: Ian Allan. ISBN 0-7110-0380-7.
- Friedman, Norman (2009). British Destroyers: From Earliest Days to the Second World War. Barnsley, UK: Seaforth Publishing. ISBN 978-1-84832-049-9.
- Gardiner, Robert & Gray, Randal (1985). Conway's All The World's Fighting Ships 1906–1921. London: Conway Maritime Press. ISBN 0-85177-245-5.
- Jellicoe, John (1919). The Grand Fleet 1914–16: Its Creation, Development and Work. London: Cassell and Company. OCLC 859842281.
- Kemp, Paul (1999). The Admiralty Regrets: British Warship Losses of the 20th Century. Stroud, UK: Sutton Publishing. ISBN 0-7509-1567-6.
- March, Edgar J. (1966). British Destroyers: A History of Development, 1892–1953; Drawn by Admiralty Permission From Official Records & Returns, Ships' Covers & Building Plans. London: Seeley Service. OCLC 164893555.
