= Kaiser-class battleship =

German Imperial Navy battleship class

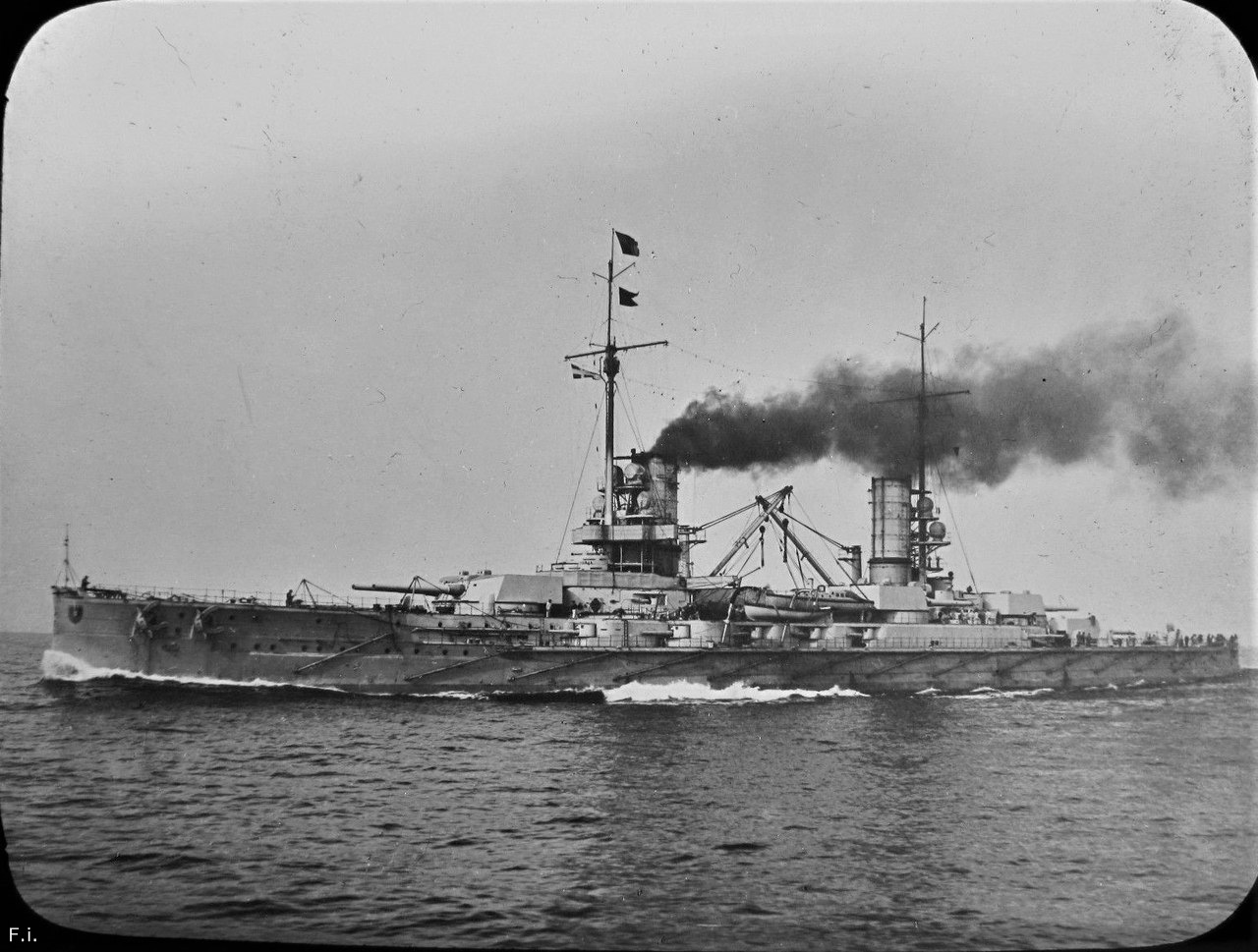
- SMS Kaiser

Class overview
- Builders: AG Vulcan Stettin (1); Howaldtswerke (1); Friedrich Krupp Germaniawerft (1); Kaiserliche Werft Kiel (1); Schichau-Werke (1)
- Operators: Imperial German Navy
- Preceded by: Helgoland class
- Succeeded by: König class
- Built: 1909–1913
- In commission: 1912–1919
- Completed: 5
- Scrapped: 5

General characteristics
- Type: Dreadnought battleship
- Displacement: Normal: 24,724 t (24,334 long tons); Full load: 27,000 t (27,000 long tons)
- Length: 172.4 m (565 ft 7 in)
- Beam: 29 m (95 ft 2 in)
- Draft: 9.1 m (29 ft 10 in)
- Installed power: 28,000 PS (28,000 shp) (Note: These are for the first four ships; SMS Prinzregent Luitpold had a different system and slightly lower performance. See the Propulsion section for further details.); 16 × Schulz-Thornycroft water-tube boilers
- Propulsion: 3 × steam turbines; 3 × propellers
- Speed: 21 knots (39 km/h; 24 mph)
- Range: 7,900 nmi (14,600 km; 9,100 mi) at 12 knots (22 km/h; 14 mph)
- Complement: 41 officers; 1,043 enlisted men
- Armament: 10 × 30.5 cm (12 in) guns; 14 × 15 cm (5.9 in) guns; 8 × 8.8 cm (3.5 in) guns; 5 × 50 cm (19.7 in) torpedo tubes
- Armor: Belt: 35 cm (13.8 in); Turrets: 30 cm (11.8 in); Battery: 17 cm (6.7 in); Conning Tower: 35 cm

The Kaiser class were five dreadnought battleships that were built for the German Kaiserliche Marine (Imperial Navy) in the 1910s: Kaiser, Friedrich der Grosse, Kaiserin, Prinzregent Luitpold, and König Albert. They entered service shortly before World War I, and saw significant combat during the conflict. The Kaiser-class ships introduced several technological improvements to German battleship design, including steam turbines for propulsion and a more efficient superfiring arrangement for some of their main battery guns. They were also faster and more heavily armored than their predecessors of the Nassau and Helgoland classes. Carrying a primary armament of ten 30.5 cm (12 in) guns, they were less heavily armed than their British counterparts. (Note: Contemporary British battleshis, such as the Orion class, carried the same number of 34.3 cm (13.5 in) guns.)

After entering service in 1913, Kaiser and König Albert embarked on a major cruise to South America and southern Africa, returning home shortly before the start of war in 1914. The five ships served as VI Division of III Battle Squadron, the core of the High Seas Fleet. They took part in numerous fleet operations in the first three years of the war, which rarely led to battle with British forces, but that culminated in the Battle of Jutland on 31 May – 1 June 1916. Four were present during the Battle of Jutland; König Albert was in dock at the time. Kaiser was the only ship of the class to be damaged in the battle. In return, ships of the class contributed to the destruction of two British cruisers. In 1917, the ships were transferred to IV Battle Squadron, and they took part in Operation Albion in the Baltic Sea late that year.

At the end of the war, all five ships were interned at the British naval base in Scapa Flow during peace negotiations. On 21 June 1919, they were scuttled by their crews to prevent their seizure by the Royal Navy. The ships were subsequently raised and broken up for scrap between 1929 and 1937.

== Development ==
=== Initial designs ===
Plan and profile drawing of the Helgoland class

Development of the Kaiser class began in early 1908 with the German Kaiserliche Marine (Imperial Navy) in a difficult position. The first two classes of dreadnought battleships ordered by Germany—the Nassau and Helgoland classes—had sharply increased in cost over earlier pre-dreadnought battleships, and the Reichstag (Imperial Diet) had begun to question the spiraling costs. At the time, Admiral Alfred von Tirpitz, the state secretary of the Reichsmarineamt (RMA—Imperial Naval Office), had recently secured parliamentary approval for the 1908 amendment to the Naval Law, but objections to the rising naval expenditures soon began to mount. The situation was exacerbated by criticism from retired naval officers such as Vice Admiral Karl Galster, who opposed Tirpitz's plans and preferred a smaller and more defensively oriented fleet based on cruisers for trade protection and commerce raiding coupled with torpedo boats and submarines for defense of Germany's coastline. The situation was to an extent moot, as the Naval Law already fixed the schedule of battleship construction, and the 1908 amendment reduced the replacement age of existing battleships from 25 to 20 years, so the six Siegfried-class coastal defense ships, the two Odin-class coastal defense ships, and as the four Brandenburg-class battleships would have to be replaced.

Tirpitz nevertheless proceeded with development of a successor to the Helgoland class, requesting new proposals from the Construction Department of the RMA on 15 May 1908, before work on the preceding battleships had even begun. He instructed the staff to use the same armor layout and boilers as Helgoland, but they should substitute new steam turbines for the triple-expansion steam engines used in the earlier vessel. The position of the secondary armament was to be raised to reduce the potential for flooding through the gun ports in the event of underwater damage or severe listing. The number and arrangement of main battery guns was a topic for open discussion. By early June, the department had prepared five options, designated "1a", "1b", "1c", "2", and "3". Details of the latter two have not survived, but the first three were variations on the same general arrangement: two superfiring main battery gun turrets forward, another superfiring pair aft, and two wing turrets placed amidships; the primary difference between the three versions was the height at which the secondary guns were mounted and the amount of freeboard.

The question of cost once again intervened in the form of a general budget crisis in the German government, and Tirpitz was compelled to agree to keep the price of the next class of battleships at the level approved for Helgoland. He was now confronted with the possibility of repeating the Helgoland design for the next four-ship division of battleships or reducing the armament of the new ships to retain the turbines, which were significantly more expensive than the older steam engines. Hans Bürkner, the chief naval architect, proposed reducing the number of main guns from twelve to ten, which would reduce prices to an acceptable level, though Tirpitz was adamantly opposed to the idea. Consideration was given to deleting cruising turbines, but this was estimated to reduce the ship's range by up to 25%, and it could not be remedied without unacceptable increases to the ships' size and draft to accommodate larger coal storage bunkers. Instead, Tirpitz asked Bürkner to prepare a variant of "1c" with a more closely arranged secondary battery, which would shorten the area needed to be protected with armor, and would thus save weight. The result was labeled "1c2", and was completed in August and approved by Tirpitz in September.

Another major problem loomed: the British Royal Navy was rumored to be developing a new 34.3 cm (13.5 in) gun to arm the successors to HMS Neptune, and the level of armor protection adopted for "1c2" was inadequate to protect the new ship from these larger British weapons. This led to the development of two new versions by October, "1c3" and "1c4", which traded lighter armor at the bow and stern for suitable levels of armor protection in the citadel. The latter also incorporated a raised forecastle to improve seakeeping. By this time, renewed political opposition to further increases in naval spending came from Chancellor Bernhard von Bülow and Reinhold Sydow, the finance minister. Tirpitz was accordingly forced to abandon his objection to Bürkner's proposed solution, and ten-gun-armed designs began to be evaluated by December 1908.

=== Finalizing the design ===
Plan and profile drawing of the Kaiser class

The Construction Department prepared a total of nine 10-gun variants in late December 1908; these were numbered from 8 to 16. Each variant adopted different arrangements of the main battery turrets, including a combination of centerline turrets, some in superfiring arrangements and others not; wing turrets either in en echelon arrangements or abreast of each other; and even two proposals that had two twin-gun turrets placed side-by-side forward, like the old Siegfried-class coastal defense ships. Before any of these proposals was selected for further development, Tirpitz met with Kaiser Wilhelm II on 14 January 1909 to secure approval to reduce the armament from twelve to ten guns. Wilhelm II agreed, but mandated that the decrease in offensive power must be balanced by an increase in defensive qualities.

Tirpitz soon settled on two designs, "8" and "16", for further development, which produced "8a" and "16a". Both of these used a similar arrangement of the main guns: one turret forward, two wing turrets en echelon, and two more in a superfiring pair aft. The chief difference was that "16a" was slightly longer, which gave enough room to space the wing turrets far enough apart that they were able to fire to either broadside over limited arcs. The weight savings from the sixth turret was used to increase belt armor from 300 to 340 mm (11.8 to 13.4 in) in thickness, and to extend the height of the belt. He took both designs to Wilhelm II for review on 27 January. Wilhelm approved "16a" to be developed into the new battleship. The Construction Department objected to the selection, citing the asymmetrical arrangement of the guns, though they were overruled by the General Navy Department of the RMA, which pointed out that the battlecruisers of the Von der Tann, Moltke, and Seydlitz classes used the same en echelon pattern.

Bürkner presented a refined proposal, "16a mod", on 16 March; the primary changes being another increase in length coupled with a slightly narrowed hull to improve its hydrodynamic efficiency. This also allowed the casemate battery to be spread out and created room for another boiler. Several major details remained to be decided, however, including the arrangement of the propulsion system. Bürkner suggested a four-shaft set of Parsons turbines, though included an option for a three-shaft system using AEG turbines. During a meeting on 30 March, representatives of the General Navy Department presented criticisms, citing what they expected to be insufficient freeboard, the mounting of 8.8 cm (3.5 in) guns atop the wing turrets (a British practice they disliked), and the suggestion that the wing turrets receive fewer shells but would be able to share between their magazines. (Note: The General Department noted that moving shells and propellant between the guns would either require doors cut into the watertight compartments below the armor deck and thus compromise underwater protection, or would have to be done above the deck, which they felt was too dangerous in light of the possibility of enemy shellfire.) Another meeting on 7 April was spent evaluating "16a mod" for minor cuts to various aspects to reduce the expected displacement from 24,500 to 24,280 metric tons (24,110 to 23,900 long tons; 27,010 to 26,760 short tons).

As the Construction Department continued to refine the design, it was discovered that the buoyancy of the propeller shafts equated to about 230 t (230 long tons; 250 short tons) of displacement, which allowed several of the reductions imposed in April to be reversed. The thickness of the belt armor was also increased to 350 mm (13.8 in). On 1 September, the RMA sent the finalized criteria to the various German shipyards to solicit bids. Initially, four vessels were authorized on 30 September, though the propeller arrangement was still not settled at this late date. The issue was finally resolved in a pair of meetings on 22 and 27 October, and Tirpitz ultimately selected the three-shaft system. Next, on 23 November, Tirpitz requested a study to evaluate the possibility of drastically revising the armament for the next battleship—designated "Ersatz Odin"—to use triple turrets. The Construction Department quickly pointed to several problems, namely the significant cost of developing the new turrets, problems with supplying the center gun, and difficulties with fire-control practices. Next, the designers evaluated the possibility of keeping all five turrets on the centerline, as was by then standard British and American practice. The studies eventually led to the follow-on König-class battleships, but the anticipated delays in designing the new ships led Tirpitz to order Ersatz Odin as a fifth Kaiser-class ship.

=== Diesel engines ===
Representatives for Maschinenfabrik Augsburg-Nürnberg (MAN) gave a presentation in the Reichstag proposing the adoption of diesel engines for future battleships. Shortly thereafter, the Construction Department evaluated the idea, and Admiral Max Rollmann stated the engines would have several benefits over traditional coal-fired boiler and turbine systems. These included significant reductions in weight of the system and the number of men needed to operate them, since stokers would no longer be needed. In addition, exhaust gases would be much reduced, which meant that fewer funnels would be needed, thereby decreasing the ship's size as a target. Counted against these improvements were two major drawbacks: coal bunkers were an integral part of a ship's protection scheme, so there would be a loss in defensive capabilities, and the engines were very tall, which would require alterations to the deck armor. The other major issue confronting the German naval planners was the untested nature of diesel engines that large, though MAN agreed to build a testbed engine at its own expense.

Rollmann recommended accepting the proposal, and Tirpitz inquired as to whether the first two ships could be redesigned to include the new engine on their central propeller shafts (while retaining turbines and boilers on the outboard shafts). The Construction and General departments rejected the idea, since work on the turbines had already begun, and any change would involve delays and increased costs that the navy was unable to bear. These costs were in part the result of a need to redesign the turbines to increase their power to allow the ships to reach their intended maximum speed without the diesel engine. It was ultimately decided that the last vessel, Ersatz Odin, would be fitted with the engine on an experimental basis. It was not ready by the time the ship was completed, however, since repeated problems with the testbed engine required significant alterations and redesigns. In addition, the outbreak of World War I in July 1914 forced the designers to switch from standard diesel fuel to tar oil, since Germany lacked ready access to petroleum products. The finalized engine was not ready to be installed until mid-1918, but the ship could not be taken out of service to have it retrofitted due to the ongoing conflict.

== Design ==
=== General characteristics ===
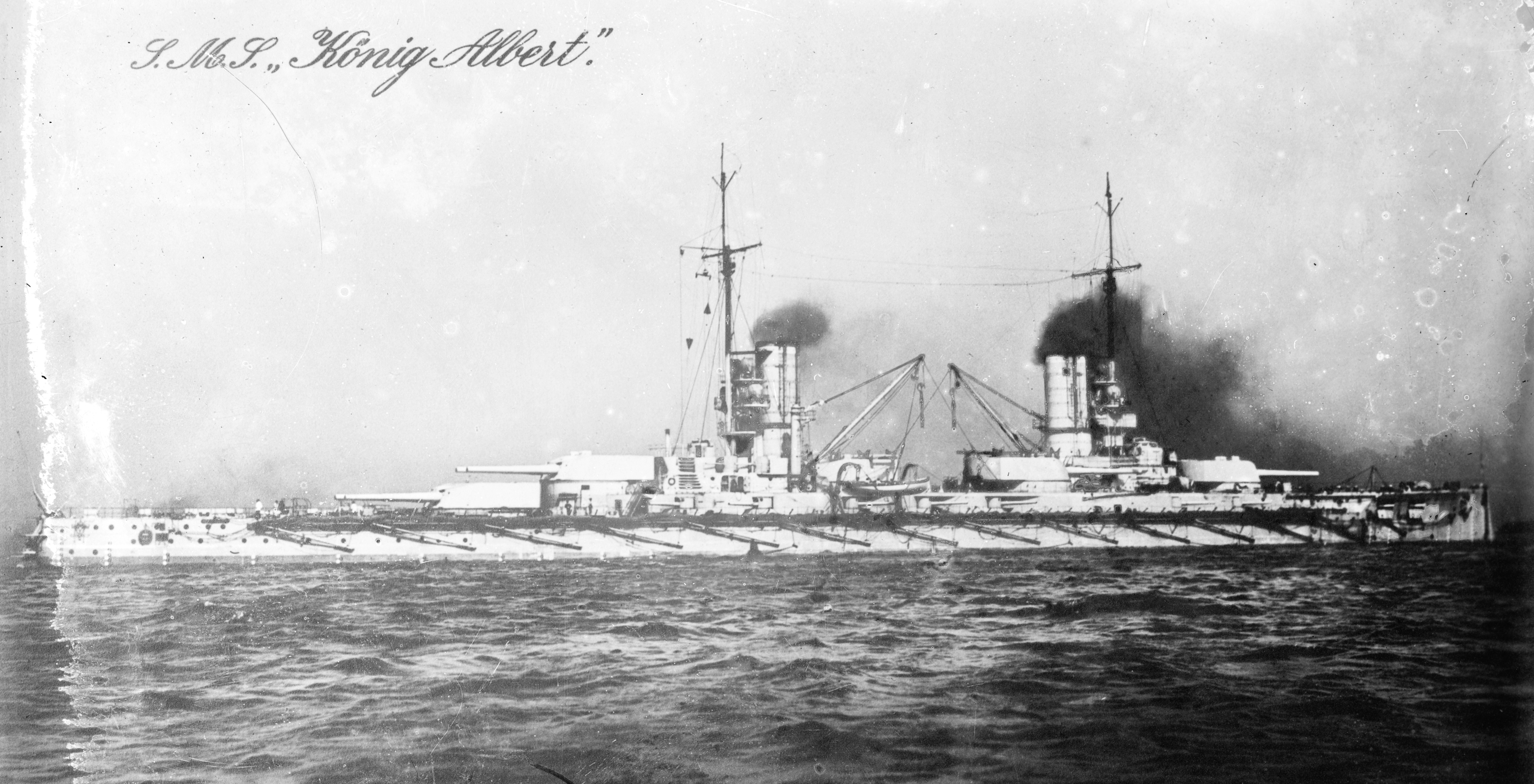
SMS König Albert probably before World War I

The ships of the Kaiser class were 171.8 m (563 ft 8 in) long at the waterline, and 172.4 m (565 ft 7 in) long overall. The ships had a beam of 29 m (95 ft 2 in), a draft of 9.1 m (29 ft 10 in) forward and 8.8 m (28 ft 10 in) aft. They displaced 24,724 metric tons (24,334 long tons; 27,254 short tons) as designed and up to 27,000 t (26,570 long tons; 29,760 short tons) at full load. Each hull was constructed with transverse and longitudinal steel frames, and had a slightly inverted bow. The ships had a double bottom for 88 percent of the length of the hull and seventeen watertight compartments. Unlike the earlier German dreadnoughts that had flush decks, the Kaiser class had a raised forecastle deck that extended until the superfiring barbette, where it stepped down to main deck level. Their superstructure consisted of an armored conning tower forward with a bridge and chart house atop it; a smaller, secondary conning tower was located further aft. Each conning tower also had a light pole mast to be used for signaling purposes.

The ships had a crew of 41 officers and 1,043 seamen. While serving as squadron flagship, the ships had an additional 14 officers and 80 men, and as the second command flagship, the ships' usual complement was augmented by another 2 officers and 23 men. Friedrich der Grosse was intended to serve as the fleet flagship, and as such she received additional command spaces. The admiral's staff was placed in the normal navigation bridge, and the ship's staff was relocated to a second platform and charthouse placed above it; the platform initially had basic canvas screens, but over the winter of 1914, it was reinforced with a fully enclosed structure. Prinzregent Luitpold, intended to serve as a divisional flagship, received a similar but smaller arrangement. Each battleship carried a number of smaller boats. These included one picket boat, three admiral's barges, two launches, two yawls, and two dinghies.

The Kaiser-class ships were excellent sea boats, but were very stiff, suffering a slight loss of speed in heavy swells. Steering was controlled via a pair of rudders. They were responsive to commands from the helm; they turned quickly initially, but suffered from severe torque at a hard rudder. With the rudders hard over, the ships would lose up to 66 percent of their speed and heel over as much as 8 degrees. The Kaiser-class ships had a transverse metacentric height of 2.59 m (8.5 ft).

=== Propulsion ===
The Kaiser-class ships were the first German battleships to be powered by turbines. They used turbines from several different manufacturers as the RMA and German shipyards attempted to find an alternative to the Parsons turbine monopoly. (Note: Turbina, the Germany-based branch of Parsons' company, offered the RMA the opportunity to purchase a license to produce their own turbines of the Parson design, but Tirpitz rejected it. He and other senior members of the RMA preferred to keep open the possibility of purchasing turbines built by German companies as opposed to wedding the German Navy to Parsons turbines.) Nevertheless, Kaiser and Kaiserin were both equipped with three sets of Parsons turbines. Friedrich der Grosse had three sets of AEG-Curtis turbines, while König Albert was powered by Schichau turbines. The turbines drove three-bladed screws that were 3.75 m (12.3 ft) in diameter. Steam was provided by sixteen Schulz-Thornycroft water-tube boilers, except in Prinzregent Luitpold, which had only 14 boilers. Hollow grates were fitted to the boilers between 1916 and 1917. The boilers were vented through two widely spaced funnels. Prinzregent Luitpold was equipped with two sets of Parsons turbines on the outer shafts. It was intended that a single 12,000 bhp Germania 6-cylinder 2-stroke diesel engine would drive the center shaft. However, the diesel power plant was not ready in time to be installed in Prinzregent Luitpold, so the ship sailed with only two shafts. Electrical power was provided by four double turbo-generators and two diesel generators. They produced a total output of 1,800 kilowatts at 225 volts.

The propulsion systems for the first four ships were rated to produce 28,000 metric horsepower (28,000 shp) for a top speed of 21 knots (39 km/h; 24 mph); Prinzregent Luitpold's reduced powerplant produced 26,000 PS (26,000 shp), for a reduced speed of 20 knots (37 km/h; 23 mph). It was found that the ships' machinery had a very large margin of safety, and on trials, each vessel significantly exceeded its design specifications. Over the course of their measured mile tests at overload power, the ships reached as high as 55,187 PS (54,432 shp) for 23.46 knots (43.45 km/h; 27.00 mph) for Kaiser, the fastest battleship Germany built during the imperial period. The next three ships all exceeded 22 knots (41 km/h; 25 mph), while Prinzregent Luitpold made 21.7 knots (40.2 km/h; 25.0 mph) from 38,800 PS (38,300 shp). These were not speeds that could be maintained for long, however, particularly not as the ships and their engines aged. The three-shaft ships carried 3,600 metric tons of coal, which enabled a maximum range of 7,900 nautical miles (14,600 km; 9,100 mi) at a cruising speed of 12 knots (22 km/h; 14 mph). Prinzregent Luitpold carried a reduced bunkerage—3,200 metric tons—but was designed to carry 400 tons of oil for the diesel engine. On diesel power alone, Prinzregent Luitpold would have had a range of 2,000 nautical miles at 12 knots.

=== Armament ===
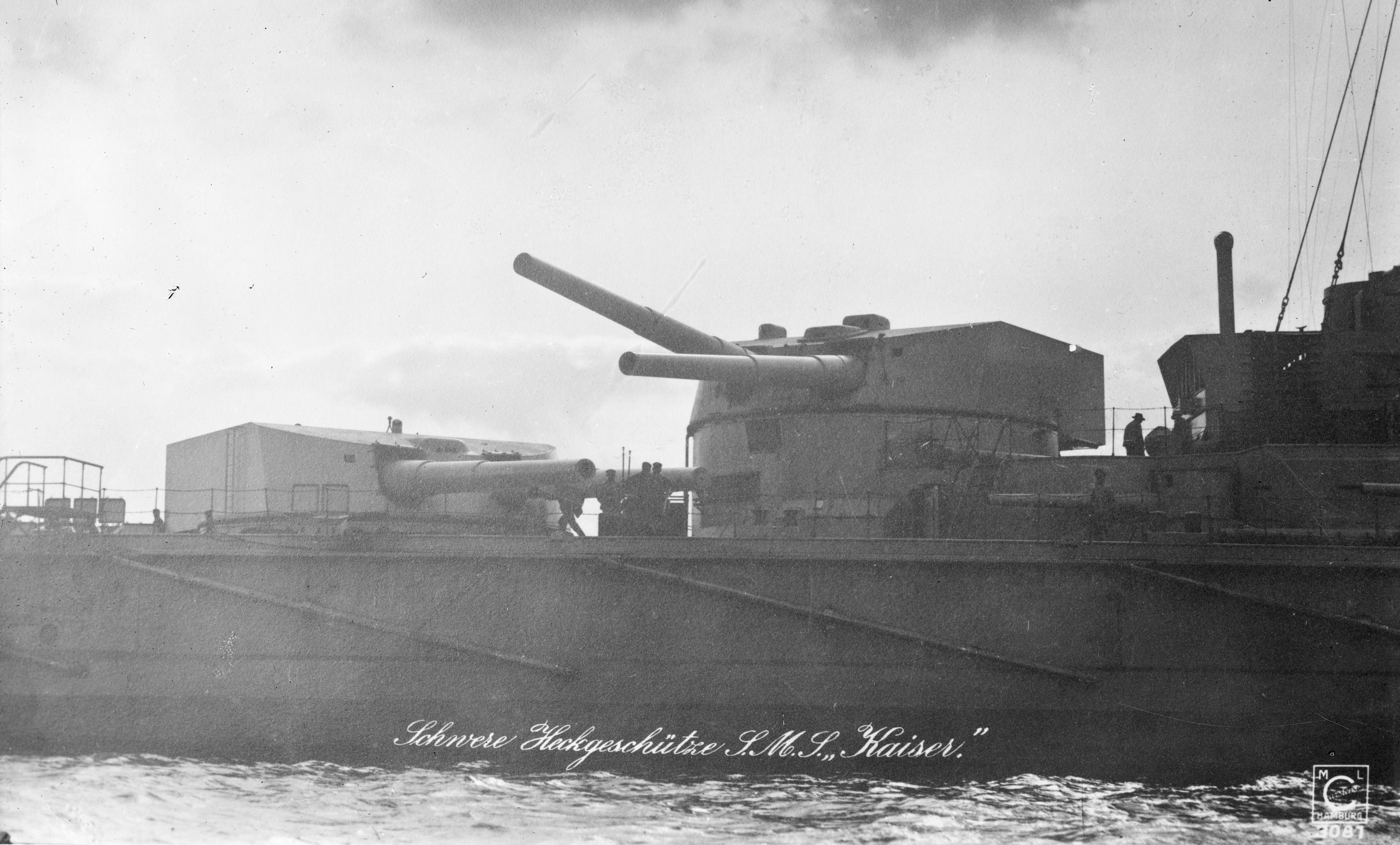
Kaiser's rear superfiring turrets

The Kaiser-class ships each carried ten 30.5 cm (12 in) SK L/50 guns (Note: In Imperial German Navy gun nomenclature, "SK" (Schnelladekanone) denotes that the gun quick firing, while the L/50 denotes the length of the gun. In this case, the L/50 gun is 50 caliber, meaning that the gun barrel is 50 times as long as it is in diameter.) mounted in five twin turrets. One turret was mounted fore, two were mounted en echelon as wing turrets amidships, and the fourth and fifth turrets were mounted in a superfiring pair aft. The guns were placed in C/1909 mountings, which were very similar to the older C/1908 gun mounts used in the preceding Helgoland-class ships. Each turret had a working chamber beneath it that was connected to a set of revolving ammunition hoists leading down to the magazine below it. One set of hoists retrieved the shells and propellant charges from the magazines and brought them to the working chamber, and another transferred them up to the gun house through flash-tight doors; this arrangement was adopted to reduce the risk of fire in the gun house from reaching the magazines. In an effort to reduce the possibility of a fire, everything in the turret was constructed of steel.

The guns were supplied with a total of 860 shells, for 86 rounds per gun. The shells were 894 lb (406 kg), and were fired at a muzzle velocity of 854 meters per second (2,805 feet per second). Each gun had a rate of fire of about three shots per minute. The barrels had an expected life of two hundred full-power shots before they would need to be replaced. The mountings were initially capable of depression to −8 degrees and elevation to 13.5 degrees. At maximum elevation, the guns had a range of up to 18,700 m (20,500 yd). After the Battle of Dogger Bank in January 1915, where British ships had been able to open fire first, outside the range of the German guns, the mountings were modified to depress to −5.5 degrees and elevate to 16 degrees. This extended the maximum range of 20,500 m (22,400 yd).

The ships had a secondary battery of fourteen 15 cm (5.9 in) SK L/45 quick-firing guns, each mounted in casemates. These guns were intended for defense against torpedo-armed destroyers. The guns each had a supply of one hundred and sixty 99.9 lb (45.3 kg) shells, for a total of 2240. Firing at a muzzle velocity of 835 m/s (2,740 ft/s), the guns could hit targets at a distance 13,500 m (14,800 yd), and after modifications in 1915, the range was extended to 16,800 m (18,400 yd). Their rate of fire was around 7 shots per minute. Each casemate had its own set of magazines and ammunition hoists.

The ships were also equipped with eight 8.8 cm (3.5 in) SK L/45 guns. The guns could be elevated up to 25 degrees for a maximum range of 10,694 m (35,085 ft). They were eventually rearmed with four 8.8 cm L/45 Flak guns, two of which were later removed. These were the same type of gun, only converted to anti-aircraft use via high-angle mountings. In this configuration, they could engage aircraft up to 7,000 m (23,000 ft). They were supplied with high explosive shells.

As was customary for capital ships of the period, the Kaiser-class ships were armed with five 50 cm (19.7 in) submerged torpedo tubes. One was mounted in the bow, while the other four were placed on the broadside, two on each flank of the ship. The torpedoes were the G7*** type, which carried a 195 kg (430 lb) warhead. They could be set at three speeds: 35 knots (65 km/h; 40 mph) for a range of 5,000 m (5,468 yd), 28.5 knots (52.8 km/h; 32.8 mph) for a range of 10,700 m (11,702 yd), or 25.5 knots (47.2 km/h; 29.3 mph) for a range of 12,510 m (13,680 yd).

=== Armor ===
Schematic showing the general layout of naval armor during the period, including the belt armor (A), upper deck (B), curved armor deck (C), and the torpedo bulkhead (D)

As with all major contemporary German warships, the Kaiser-class ships were protected by Krupp cemented steel armor. The ships' main defensive armor, the armor belt, extended for almost the entire length of the hull, though it was strongest and offered the most extensive protection in the central portion, where it covered the ammunition magazines and propulsion machinery spaces. This section extended from the fore barbette to the aft main battery turret, and it covered from 1.8 m (6 ft) above the waterline to 0.36 m (1 ft 2 in) below. In this section, the belt was 35 cm (13.8 in) thick. Toward the bow, the belt was reduced to 18 cm (7.1 in), tapering down to 12 cm (4.7 in) at the bottom edge. The stern section of the belt was 12 cm thick, being reduced to 8 cm (3.1 in) at the lower edge. Above the main belt, where it covered the secondary battery guns, a strake of armor that was 20.3 cm (8 in) thick covered the sides of the ships up to the main deck. The upper strake was capped at either end by transverse bulkheads that were 30.5 cm thick.

Behind the belt, an armor deck with sloped sides provided additional protection against shells or fragments that penetrated the belt. The sloped portions of the deck extended down to connect to the bottom of the belt armor. The deck was 3.0 cm (1.2 in) in the central portion, where the belt was strongest. In the bow section, the deck increased in thickness to 6.1 cm (2.4 in), and the stern section increased further to 6.1 to 10.2 cm (2.4 to 4 in). Over the steering gear, the deck was strengthened even further, reaching a thickness of 12 cm.

For defense against underwater damage, the ships were equipped with several features. To prevent torpedoes from striking the vessels, each ship carried anti-torpedo nets along its sides, though these were removed in 1916. Behind the armored belt, the ships had a torpedo bulkhead 4 cm (1.6 in) thick. It was set back from the belt by about 4.0 m (13 ft), and halfway between the bulkhead and the outer plating, a light partition that was 7.94 mm (0.3125 in) thick separated the two. The outer void was left empty, while the inner one was used to store coal. These coal bunkers were fitted with guillotine-style doors that closed when not in active use. Above the main deck, the torpedo bulkhead continued up to the upper deck, where it served to capture any splinters that penetrated the belt.

The forward conning tower had a roof that was 15 cm (5.9 in) thick; the sides were 35 cm thick. Atop the conning tower was the smaller gunnery control tower, which had a curved face that was 40 cm (15.7 in) thick. The aft conning tower was significantly less well-armored; the sides were 20 cm (7.9 in) thick, and the roof was only 5 cm (2 in) thick. The main battery turrets were protected by 30 cm of armor on the faces, 25 cm (10 in) on the sides, and 29 cm (11.5 in) on the rears. They had roofs that consisted of a sloped portion at the front that was 11.0 cm (4.35 in) thick, along with a flat portion that was 8.1 cm (3.2 in) thick. Each turret rested in a barbette that was 30.5 cm thick on its exposed sides. Where they were covered by the belt armor, the barbettes for the centerline turrets were reduced to 20.3 cm thickness, while the wing turret barbettes received only 8.1 to 14.0 cm (3.2 to 5.5 in) behind the belt. The 15 cm guns had 8 cm (3.1 in) thick gun shields, and their casemates had 17 cm (6.7 in) of armor on their exposed sides.

== Construction ==
Kaiser, the name ship of the class, was laid down at the Kaiserliche Werft Kiel in December 1909 under construction number 35. The ship was launched on 22 March 1911, and commissioned into the High Seas Fleet on 1 August 1912. Friedrich der Grosse followed on 26 January 1910, at the AG Vulcan shipyard in Hamburg. She was launched on 10 June 1911 and commissioned as the flagship of the High Seas Fleet on 15 October 1912. Kaiserin, the third ship of the class, was laid down in the Howaldtswerke in Kiel in November 1910. She was launched on 11 November 1911, and commissioned on 14 May 1913.

König Albert was laid down at Schichau in Danzig on 17 July 1910, and launched on 27 April 1912. She was commissioned into the fleet on 31 July 1913. Prinzregent Luitpold, the last ship of the class, was laid down in January 1911 at the Germaniawerft shipyard in Kiel. The ship was launched on 17 February 1912 and commissioned on 19 August 1913.

=== Ships ===
Construction data
Ship	Contract name	Builder	Namesake	Laid down	Launched	Commissioned	Fate
Kaiser	Ersatz Hildebrand	Kaiserliche Werft, Kiel	Kaiser Wilhelm II	December 1909	22 March 1911	1 August 1912	Scuttled, 21 June 1919
Friedrich der Grosse	Ersatz Heimdall	AG Vulcan, Hamburg	König Friedrich II von Preußen	January 1910	10 June 1911	15 October 1912	Scuttled, 21 June 1919
Kaiserin	Ersatz Hagen	Howaldtswerke, Kiel	Kaiserin Auguste Viktoria von Schleswig-Holstein	November 1910	11 November 1911	14 May 1913	Scuttled, 21 June 1919
Prinzregent Luitpold	Ersatz Ägir	Germaniawerft, Kiel	Prinzregent Luitpold von Bayern	October 1910	17 February 1912	19 August 1913	Scuttled, 21 June 1919
König Albert	Ersatz Odin	Schichau-Werke, Danzig	König Albert von Sachsen	July 1910	27 April 1912	31 July 1913	Scuttled, 21 June 1919

== Service history ==
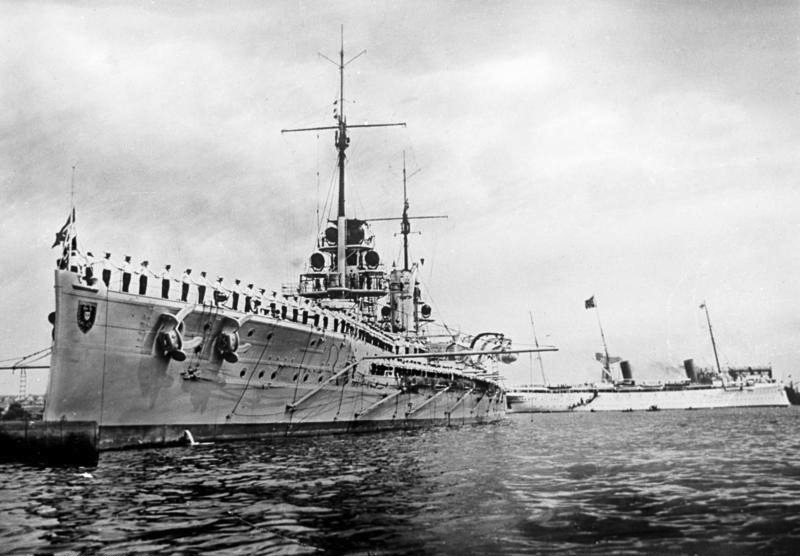
SMS Kaiser at Kiel Week festivities in June 1913. The imperial yacht Hohenzollern lies in the background.

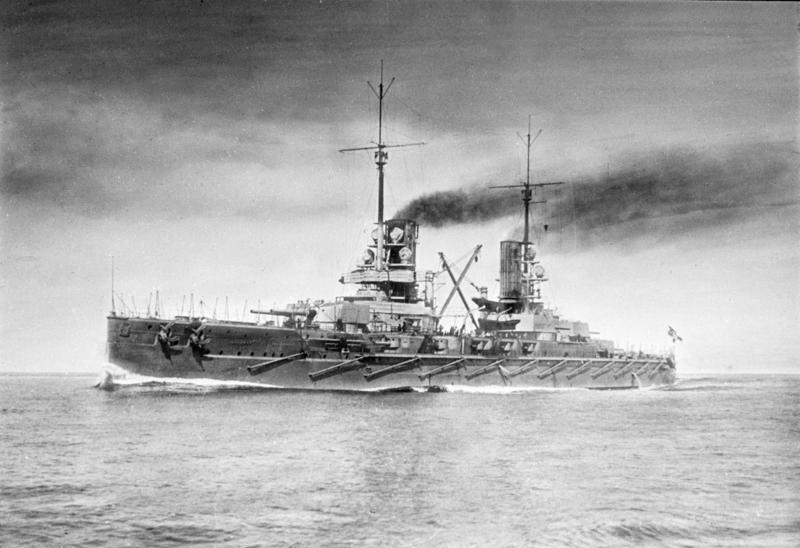
A pre-war illustration of Prinzregent Luitpold underway

=== Pre-war ===
As they commissioned in late 1912 ad early 1913, the Kaiser-class battleships joined the High Seas Fleet operating in home waters, where they were assigned to the newly created III Battle Squadron. Friedrich der Grosse relieved the pre-dreadnought battleship Deutschland as the fleet flagship upon entering active service in January 1913. In December 1913, Kaiser and König Albert took part in a major overseas tour to South America and South Africa. The cruise was designed to demonstrate German power projection, as well as to test the reliability of the new turbine engines on long-range operations. They arrived back in Germany in June 1914. During their peacetime careers, the other members of the class that remained in home waters conducted routine training exercises in the North and Baltic Seas, and occasionally visited foreign countries. During the summer months, they and the rest of the High Seas Fleet visited Norway in company of Kaiser Wilhelm II; the 1914 visit took place during the July Crisis that led to the outbreak of World War I at the end of the month.

=== World War I ===
The first major operation of the war in which the Kaiser-class ships participated was the Raid on Yarmouth on 3 November 1914, as part of the High Seas Fleet, which provided distant cover to the battlecruisers of I Scouting Group that carried out the raid. They were also all present for the raid on Scarborough, Hartlepool, and Whitby on 15–16 December, again providing distant support to the battlecruisers. Forming the bulk of III Battle Squadron, (Note: By this time, they had been joined by König and Grosser Kurfürst, though only the latter vessel was present owing to an accidental grounding.) the Kaisers constituted the vanguard of the German line of battle. During the operation on the morning of 16 December, the High Seas Fleet, commanded by Admiral Friedrich von Ingenohl, briefly clashed with the destroyer screen of the British 1st Battlecruiser Squadron and the 2nd Battle Squadron, which had been sent to intercept their German counterparts (as the British were able to decipher German codes thanks to a set of code books captured from the cruiser Magdeburg in August). Ingenohl, under orders from the Kaiser not to risk the fleet and fearing he had located the scouts for the entire Grand Fleet, disengaged and returned to port.

The five battleships took part in a series of sweeps into the North Sea that failed to locate British forces through 1915, by which time Ingenohl had been replaced by Admiral Hugo von Pohl. They also supported mine-laying operations in the North Sea and periodically rotated through the Baltic for periods of training. These operations continued into early 1916, when Pohl was in turn replaced by Vizeadmiral Reinhard Scheer, who preferred a more aggressive strategy for the fleet's operations. Bombardments of the British coast resumed in April 1916, when I Scouting Group bombarded Yarmouth and Lowestoft; the five Kaiser-class ships again sailed in support. When the entire Grand Fleet sortied in response to the raid, Scheer took the fleet back to port to avoid a confrontation with the numerically superior British fleet.

==== Battle of Jutland ====
Four of the ships participated in the fleet sortie that resulted in the battle of Jutland on 31 May – 1 June 1916. The operation was a repeat of earlier plans that intended to draw out a portion of the Grand Fleet and destroy it. Kaiser, Kaiserin, Prinzregent Luitpold, and Friedrich der Grosse, Scheer's flagship, made up VI Division of III Battle Squadron. III Battle Squadron was the first of three battleship units; however, the König-class battleships of V Division, III Battle Squadron were the vanguard of the fleet. Directly astern of the Kaiser-class ships were the Helgoland and Nassau-class battleships of I Battle Squadron; in the rear guard were the elderly Deutschland-class pre-dreadnoughts of II Battle Squadron.

Shortly before 16:00 CET, (Note: The times mentioned in this section are in CET, which is congruent with the German perspective. This is one hour ahead of UTC, the time zone commonly used in British works.) the battlecruisers of I Scouting Group encountered the British 1st Battlecruiser Squadron, under the command of David Beatty. The opposing ships began an artillery duel that saw the destruction of Indefatigable, shortly after 17:00, and Queen Mary, less than a half an hour later. By this time, the German battlecruisers were steaming south in order to draw the British ships towards the main body of the High Seas Fleet. At 17:30, König, the leading German battleship, spotted both I Scouting Group and the 1st Battlecruiser Squadron approaching. The German battlecruisers were steaming down to starboard, while the British ships steamed to port. At 17:45, Scheer ordered a two-point turn to port to bring his ships closer to the British battlecruisers. Shortly thereafter the order was given to commence firing; the Kaiser-class ships, with the exception of Prinzregent Luitpold, were not yet within range to engage the British battlecruisers. Prinzregent Luitpold managed to fire eight salvos at 22,300–21,300 yards (20,400–19,500 m) before the range again widened sufficiently to prevent further firing. In the meantime, Kaiser and Friedrich der Grosse, along with the battleships of II Battle Squadron, were within range of the British 2nd Light Cruiser Squadron. However, the massed fire from the ten battleships interfered with accurate spotting, and after only a few salvos fire was largely ceased.

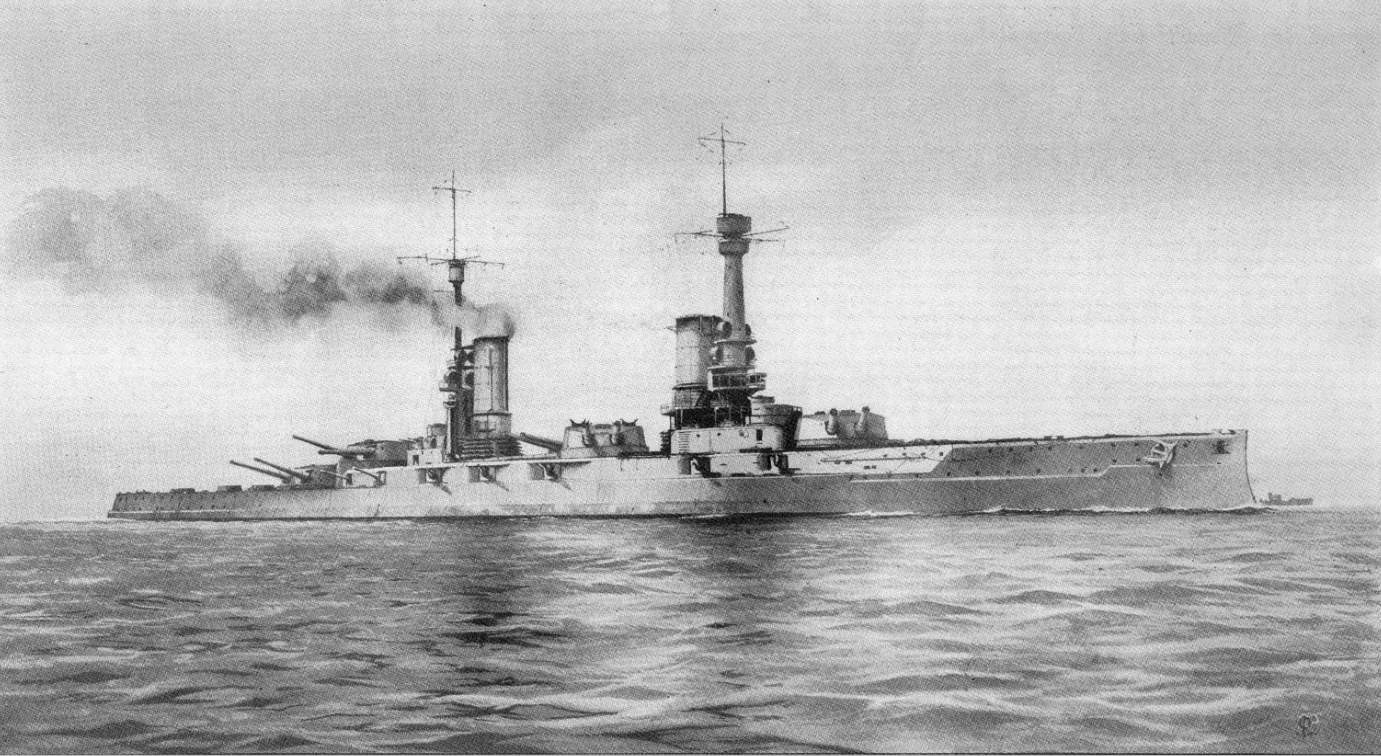
Kaiser with main battery trained to starboard

At around 19:00, the cruiser Wiesbaden, which had earlier been disabled, was coming under attack from British light forces, and so Scheer ordered his ships to turn in order to cover an attempt to bring the ship under tow. At 19:05, the British armored cruisers Defence and Warrior began firing on the crippled Wiesbaden. However, by 19:15, Hipper's battlecruisers and the battleships of III Battle Squadron appeared on the scene, and began to hammer the British ships at a range of less than 8,000 yards. Kaiser and three König-class battleships concentrated their fire on the two cruisers until one of Defence's magazines was detonated, which caused a massive explosion that destroyed the ship. Warrior, badly damaged and afire, managed to limp northward towards the Queen Elizabeth-class battleships of the 5th Battle Squadron.

While Warrior was retreating northward under the cover of her own smoke, the battleship Warspite came too close to her sister Valiant, and had to turn to starboard in order to avoid collision. At that moment, a shell from Kaiser struck Warspite's steering gear and jammed them, temporarily leaving the ship only able to steam in a large circle. Friedrich der Grosse, König, two Nassau and three Helgoland-class battleships fired on Warspite for a period of about 20 minutes; Warspite was hit 11 times before the Germans lost sight of her. Because her steering gear could not be adequately repaired, Warspite was forced to withdraw from the battle; her absence prompted the Germans to believe they had sunk her.

Upon returning to the Jade estuary, the Nassau-class battleships Nassau, Westfalen, and Posen and the Helgoland-class battleships Helgoland and Thüringen took up guard duties in the outer roadstead. Kaiser, Kaiserin, and Prinzregent Luitpold, largely undamaged during the battle, took up defensive positions outside the Wilhelmshaven locks. The other capital ships—those that were still in fighting condition—had their fuel and ammunition stocks replenished.

During the battle, Kaiser had fired 224 heavy battery and 41 secondary battery shells; Kaiserin fired 160 and 135 respectively, Prinzregent Luitpold fired 169 and 106 respectively, and Friedrich der Grosse fired 72 and 151 shells, respectively. Kaiser was hit twice by heavy-caliber shells during the battle, the only ship of the class to have been hit; however the ship suffered only a single wounded casualty.

==== Later operations ====
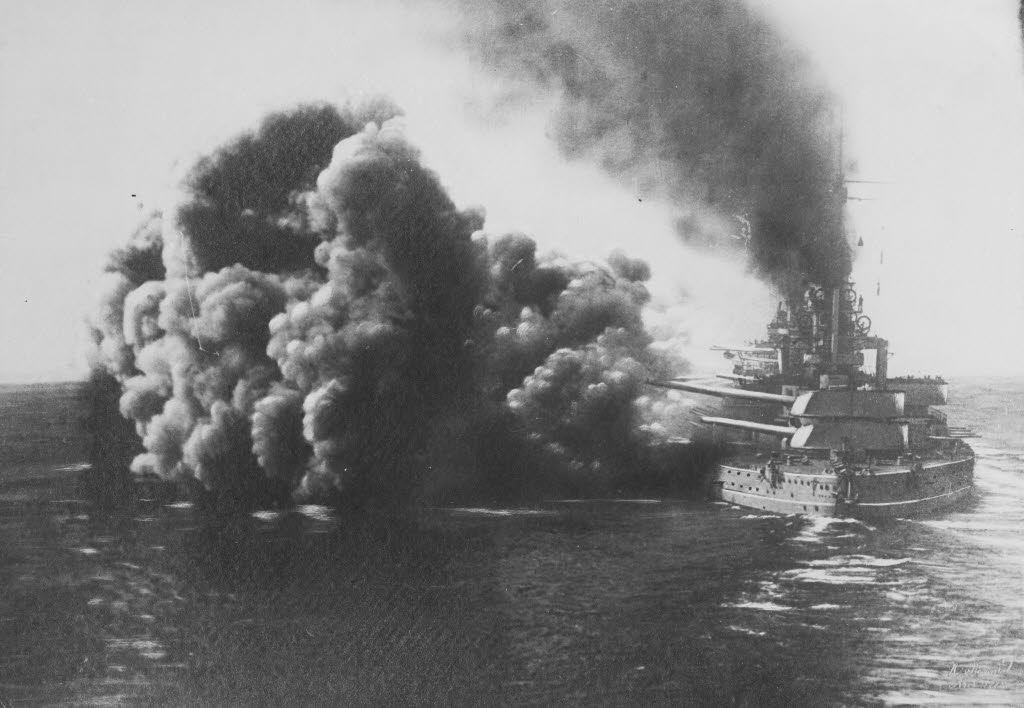
Prinzregent Luitpold bombarding Ösel, October 1917

Following the Battle of Jutland, Scheer made two further attempts to draw out elements of the Grand Fleet to be defeated. The first took place in August 1916, which saw the two serviceable battlecruisers and three battleships sail ahead with the intent to bombard the southern British coast, and the rest of the fleet in service—including the five Kaisers—trailing behind. Before they arrived, one of the German battleships was torpedoed by a submarine, and reports from reconnaissance zeppelins that the entire Grand Fleet had sailed prompted Scheer to call off the operation. The second attempt took place on 19–20 October; the British stayed in port, and the Germans had a light cruiser torpedoed for their efforts. The two failed operations convinced Scheer that his strategy would not produce the desired results, and eventually led to the resumption of the unrestricted submarine warfare campaign. On 1 December, the five Kaiser-class ships were transferred to IV Battle Squadron as part of a fleet reorganization.

In early September 1917, following the German conquest of the Russian port of Riga, the German navy decided to expunge the Russian naval forces that still held the Gulf of Riga. To this end, the Admiralstab (the Navy High Command) planned an operation in the Moonsund archipelago. The five Kaiser-class ships were assigned to the invasion force, which included significant other elements of the High Seas Fleet and a landing force of some 24,600 soldiers. Opposing the Germans was a small fleet centered on the old Russian pre-dreadnoughts Slava and Tsesarevich. The operation began on 12 October, when the Kaiser-class battleships engaged Russian artillery batteries on the Sworbe peninsula of Ösel island. Stiff Russian resistance in the Kassar Wick, the heavily mined entrance to Moon Sound, slowed the German advance. On 14 October, Kaiser was detached from the bombardment force to deal with Russian destroyers blocking the German minesweepers. Under the cover of Kaiser's 30.5 cm guns, the German torpedo boats entered the sound and sank the Russian destroyer Grom. Meanwhile, the Russian shore batteries at Zerel remained a significant problem, so Kaiserin, König Albert, and Friedrich der Grosse bombarded the positions. By 20 October, the naval operations were effectively over; the Russian ships had been destroyed or forced to withdraw, and the German army attained its objectives.

The elements of the High Seas Fleet then returned to the North Sea, where they resumed local patrol operations in the German Bight. On 17 November, Kaiser and Kaiserin were on patrol supporting minesweepers when they were attacked in the Second Battle of Helgoland Bight; the two battleships briefly skirmished with the British battlecruiser HMS Repulse and several light cruisers, but neither side pressed the attack. Kaiser escorted the light cruiser Stralsund, which had struck a naval mine, back to port.

During the same period, German light forces had begun raiding British convoys to Norway, which prompted the British to detach a squadron of battleships from the Grand Fleet to escort the convoys. In April 1918, the entire High Seas Fleet sortied in an attempt to intercept one of these convoys, in the hope of catching an isolated battle squadron and destroying it. German intelligence proved to be incorrect and they had missed the convoy's sailing; they thus returned to port without having encountered any British forces.

A final fleet action was planned for late October 1918, weeks before the Armistice was to go into effect. The Germans intended to inflict as much damage as possible on the British navy, whatever the cost to the fleet, to secure a better bargaining position for Germany. War weariness among the sailors led to the Wilhelmshaven mutiny when the order to sail was given, which forced the operation to be cancelled. The fleet was dispersed, but the unrest spread into a wider German revolution that forced Wilhelm II to abdicate in the final days of the war.

=== Fate ===
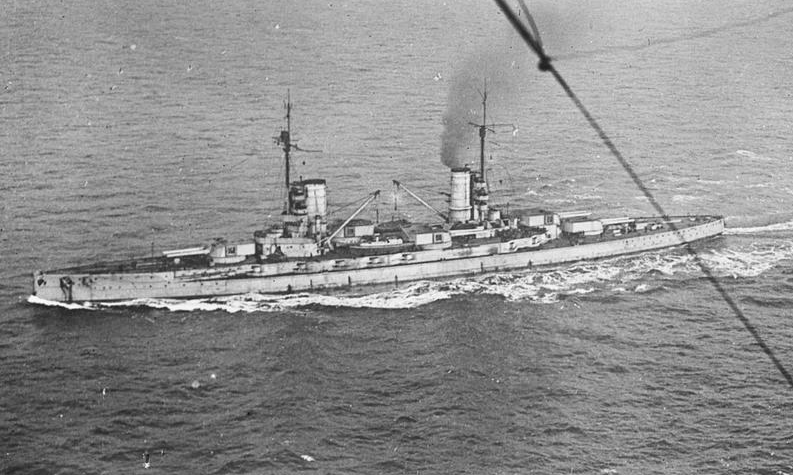
A Kaiser-class battleship steaming to Scapa Flow on 21 November 1918

Following the capitulation of Germany in November 1918, the High Seas Fleet, under the command of Rear Admiral Ludwig von Reuter, was interned in the British naval base in Scapa Flow. The fleet remained in captivity during the negotiations that ultimately produced the Versailles Treaty. It became apparent to Reuter that the British intended to seize the German ships on 21 June, which was the deadline for Germany to have signed the peace treaty. Unaware that the deadline had been extended to the 23rd, Reuter ordered his ships be sunk. On the morning of 21 June, the British fleet left Scapa Flow to conduct training maneuvers; at 10:00 Reuter transmitted the order to his ships.

Friedrich der Grosse was the first ship of the fleet to be scuttled, sinking at 12:16. She was raised on 29 April 1937 and towed to Rosyth for scrapping. The ship's bell was returned to Germany in 1965, and is currently in the Fleet Headquarters in Glücksburg. König Albert followed at 12:54, the second ship of the fleet to sink. The ship was later raised on 31 July 1935 and broken up in Rosyth over the following year. Kaiser sank at 13:25, and was raised for scrapping on 20 March 1929; breaking work was conducted in Rosyth by 1930. Prinzregent Luitpold sank five minutes later, at 13:30. She too was raised, on 9 July 1931, and broken up in Rosyth. Kaiserin, the last ship of the class to be sunk, slipped beneath the surface at 14:00. She was raised on 14 May 1936, and broken up that year in Rosyth.
