= Tagamõisa, Saare County =

Village in Estonia

Coordinates: 58°27′52″N 22°00′29″E

Tagamõisa
- Village
- Interactive map of Tagamõisa
- Country: Estonia
- County: Saare County
- Parish: Saaremaa Parish
- Time zone: UTC+2 (EET)
  - Summer (DST): UTC+3 (EEST)

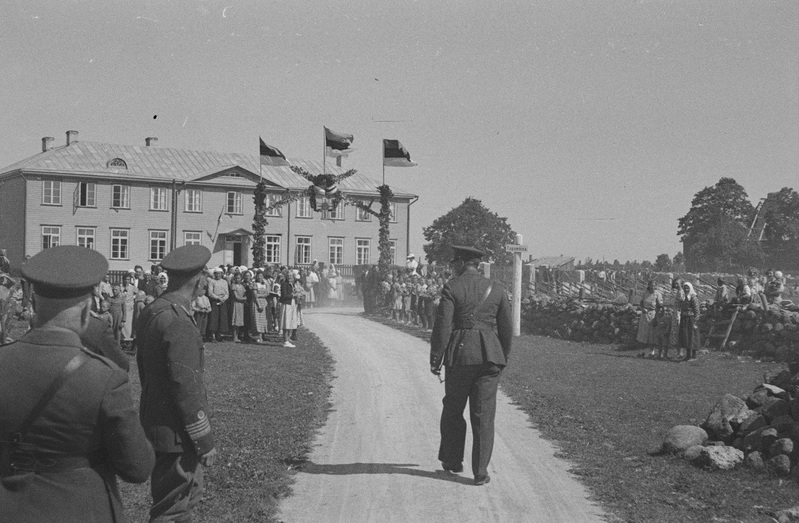
Reception of the Brothers of the Cross of Liberty in Tagamõisa, in front of the schoolhouse (1937)

Tagamõisa is a village in Saaremaa Parish, Saare County in western Estonia.

Before the administrative reform in 2017, the village was in Kihelkonna Parish.
