= HMS Cardiff =

Four ships of the Royal Navy have borne the name HMS Cardiff, after the Welsh capital city, Cardiff:

- English ship Cardiff (1652) was a 34-gun ship, previously the Dutch ship Fortune. She was captured in 1652 by Tiger and was sold in 1658.
- HMS Cardiff (D58) was a C-class light cruiser launched in 1917 and broken up in 1946.
- HMS Cardiff (D108) was a Type 42 (Batch 1) destroyer launched in 1974. She was involved in the Falklands and Gulf Wars and participated in the buildup to the 2003 invasion of Iraq. She was decommissioned in 2005, and sold for scrap.
- HMS Cardiff (F89) is a Type 26 frigate under construction as of 2024.

The ships' motto is "Agris in cardine rerum" which translates as "Keen in emergency".

== Battle honours ==
- Falkland Islands 1982
- Kuwait 1991
