= Oldenburg =

Oldenburg may refer to:

== Places ==
- Oldenburg (city), a city in Lower Saxony, Germany
  - Oldenburg (district), a district bordering the city
  - Carl von Ossietzky University of Oldenburg, a university in the city
- Oldenburg in Holstein, a town in Schleswig-Holstein, Germany
  - Oldenburg-Land, an association of municipalities bordering the town
- Oldenburg, Indiana, a town in the United States
- Oldenburg, Texas, a settlement in the United States
- Mount Oldenburg, Ellsworth Land, Antarctica

=== Historical ===
- Bishopric of Oldenburg (970–1160), a bishopric that became the Prince-bishopric of Lübeck, now in Schleswig-Holstein
- County of Oldenburg (1091–1774), a state of the Holy Roman Empire, now in Lower Saxony
- Duchy of Oldenburg (1774–1810), a state of the Holy Roman Empire
- Grand Duchy of Oldenburg (1814–1918), a state of the German Confederation and Empire
- Free State of Oldenburg (1918–1946), a state of the Weimar Republic and Nazi Germany
- Oldenburg Land, a historical region in Lower Saxony, covering the former free state

== People ==
- Claes Oldenburg (1929–2022), Swedish-American sculptor
- Henry Oldenburg (c. 1619–1677), German diplomat and the first Secretary of the Royal Society
- Jen Flynn Oldenburg (born 1978), American volleyball player and coach
- Ray Oldenburg (1932–2022), American urban sociologist
- Sergei Oldenburg (1863–1934), Russian ethnographer and politician
- Wilbrand van Oldenburg (before 1180–1233), a bishop of Paderborn and of Utrecht
- Oldenburg Baby (1997–2019), an aborted child who survived

== Ships ==
- German corvette Oldenburg (F263), a German corvette commissioned in 2013
- MS Oldenburg, a British passenger ferry
- SMS Möwe (1914) or Oldenburg, a German cargo ship and auxiliary cruiser
- SMS Oldenburg (1910), a World War I battleship
- SMS Oldenburg (1884), a German armored coastal defense ship
- SS Oldenburg (1936), a German cargo ship and auxiliary cruiser
- Suomen Joutsen or Oldenburg, a full-rigged ship

== Other uses ==
- the Oldenburg or Oldenburger, a horse breed from Lower Saxony
- House of Oldenburg, North German noble family, kings of Denmark
- Duchess of Oldenburg (apple), a Russian apple cultivar also known as Oldenburg
- Geheimrat Dr. Oldenburg, a German apple cultivar also known as Oldenburg

== See also ==
- Oldenberg
- Altenburg
