= Barsauma =

Barsauma (also spelled Barsawma, Barsawmo, Bar Sawma, Bar Sauma or Barsoum) is an Aramaic or Syriac name meaning "Son of the Fast" or "Son of Lent." It may refer to:

== People ==
- Barsauma (died 456), monk, abbot and supporter of Dioscorus of Alexandria, subject of the Life of Barsauma
- Barsauma of Nisibis (d. 491), late fifth century metropolitan of Nisibis for the Church of the East
- Bar Sawma of Seleucia-Ctesiphon (d. 1136), patriarch of the Church of the East in Baghdad
- Rabban Bar Sauma (d. 1294), bishop of the Church of the East and traveler from China to Europe
- Ignatius Afram I Barsoum (1887-1957), patriarch of the Syriac Orthodox Church
- Michel Barsoum, American scientist and engineer

== Places ==
- Monastery of Mor Bar Sauma, a monastery near Malatya
- Church of Mor Barsawmo, a church in Midyat
- Mount Barsoum, a mountain in Antarctica

== See also ==
- Barsoum elements, a mathematical technique in finite element analysis
