= Mount Helms =

Mountain in Ellsworth Land, Antarctica

Mount Helms (82°4′S 87°58′W) is a rounded, partly snow-covered peak rising between Mount Semprebon and Mount Oldenburg in the central Martin Hills of Antarctica. The peak was positioned by a United States Antarctic Research Program party led by J. Campbell Craddock in January 1963, and was named by the Advisory Committee on Antarctic Names for Ward J. Helms, a radioscience researcher at Byrd Station in 1962.

== See also ==
- Mountains in Antarctica
