= SMS Thüringen =

Battleship of the German Imperial Navy

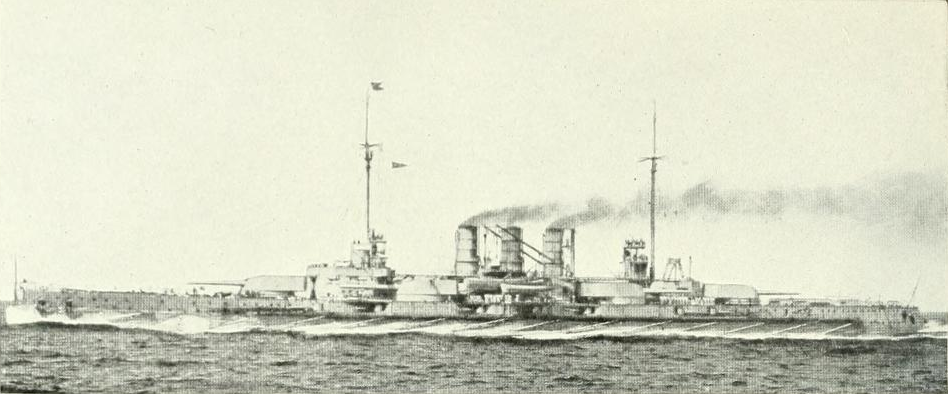
- SMS Thüringen, probably before the war

History

German Empire
- Name: Thüringen
- Namesake: Duchy of Thuringia
- Builder: AG Weser, Bremen
- Laid down: 2 November 1908
- Launched: 27 November 1909
- Commissioned: 1 July 1911
- Decommissioned: 16 December 1918
- Stricken: 5 November 1919
- Fate: Ceded to France in 1920, later used as target ship and sunk. Broken up for scrap, 1923–33

General characteristics
- Class & type: Helgoland-class battleship
- Displacement: Normal: 22,808 t (22,448 long tons); Full load: 24,700 t (24,300 long tons)
- Length: 167.20 m (548 ft 7 in)
- Beam: 28.50 m (93 ft 6 in)
- Draft: 8.94 m (29 ft 4 in)
- Installed power: 15 × water-tube boilers; 28,000 PS (28,000 ihp)
- Propulsion: 3 × triple-expansion steam engines; 3 × screw propellers
- Speed: 20.8 knots (38.5 km/h; 23.9 mph)
- Range: 5,500 nautical miles (10,190 km; 6,330 mi) at 10 knots (19 km/h; 12 mph)
- Complement: 42 officers; 1071 enlisted
- Armament: 12 × 30.5 cm (12 in) SK L/50 guns; 14 × 15 cm (5.9 in) SK L/45 guns; 14 × 8.8 cm (3.5 in) SK L/45 guns; 6 × 50 cm (19.7 in) torpedo tubes
- Armor: Belt: 300 mm (11.8 in); Turrets: 300 mm; Deck: 63.5 mm (2.50 in)

SMS Thüringen (Note: "SMS" stands for "Seiner Majestät Schiff" (German: His Majesty's Ship).) was the third vessel of the Helgoland class of dreadnought battleships of the German Kaiserliche Marine (Imperial Navy). Thüringen's keel was laid in November 1908 at the AG Weser dockyard in Bremen. She was launched on 27 November 1909 and commissioned into the fleet on 1 July 1911. The ship was equipped with twelve 30.5 cm (12 in) guns in six twin turrets, and had a top speed of 21 knots (39 km/h; 24 mph). Thüringen was assigned to I Battle Squadron of the High Seas Fleet for the majority of her career, including World War I.

Along with her three sister ships, Helgoland, Ostfriesland, and Oldenburg, Thüringen participated in all of the major fleet operations of World War I in the North Sea against the British Grand Fleet. This included the Battle of Jutland on 31 May and 1 June 1916, the largest naval battle of the war. Thüringen was involved in the heavy night fighting at Jutland, including the destruction of the armored cruiser HMS Black Prince. The ship also saw action against the Imperial Russian Navy in the Baltic Sea, where she participated in the unsuccessful first incursion into the Gulf of Riga in August 1915.

After the German collapse in November 1918, most of the High Seas Fleet was interned in Scapa Flow during the peace negotiations. The four Helgoland-class ships were allowed to remain in Germany and were therefore spared the destruction of the fleet in Scapa Flow. Thüringen and her sisters were eventually ceded to the victorious Allied powers as war reparations; Thüringen was transferred to France in April 1920 and used as a target ship for the French Navy. She was sunk off Gâvres and broken up in situ in 1923–1933, though some sections of the ship remain.

== Design ==
Many senior officers in the German Kaiserliche Marine (Imperial Navy) acknowledged that the Nassau-class battleships, armed with 28 cm (11 in) guns, were inferior to their British counterparts that carried 30.5 cm (12 in) guns. They sought to incorporate guns of the latter caliber in the next battleship design, though the significant increase in cost from the pre-dreadnought Deutschland-class battleships to the dreadnought Nassau class precluded another major qualitative increase until the 1908 budget year, two years after the first Nassaus were ordered. The design staff experimented with a variety of gun turret arrangements, including superfiring layouts like the American South Carolina class, but they ultimately settled on the same hexagonal arrangement of the Nassaus.

=== Characteristics ===
Plan and profile drawing of the Helgoland class

The ship was 167.2 m (548 ft 7 in) long, had a beam of 28.5 m (93 ft 6 in) and a draft of 8.94 m (29 ft 4 in), and displaced 24,700 metric tons (24,310 long tons) at full load. Thüringen had a flush deck and minimal superstructure that consisted primarily of a large, armored conning tower forward and a smaller, secondary conning position further aft. The ship was fitted with a pair of pole masts, which held spotting tops and positions for searchlights. She had a crew of 42 officers and 1,071 enlisted men.

She was powered by three triple-expansion steam engines, which produced a top speed of 21 knots (39 km/h; 24 mph). Steam was provided by fifteen water-tube boilers, which were vented through three closely spaced funnels placed amidships. Thüringen stored up to 3,200 metric tons (3,100 long tons) of coal, which allowed her to steam for 5,500 nautical miles (10,200 km; 6,300 mi) at a speed of 10 knots (19 km/h; 12 mph). After 1915, the boilers were modified to spray oil on the coal to increase its burn rate; the ship could carry up to 197 metric tons (194 long tons) of fuel oil.

Thüringen was armed with a main battery of twelve 30.5 cm (12 in) SK L/50 (Note: In Imperial German Navy gun nomenclature, "SK" (Schnelladekanone) denotes that the gun is quick firing, while the L/50 denotes the length of the gun. In this case, the L/50 gun is 50 calibers, meaning that the gun is 50 times as long as its diameter.) guns in six twin gun turrets, with one turret fore, one aft, and two on each flank of the ship. The ship's secondary battery consisted of fourteen 15 cm (5.9 in) SK L/45 guns, all of which were mounted in casemates in the side of the upper deck. For defense against torpedo boats, she carried fourteen 8.8 cm (3.5 in) SK L/45 guns. After 1914, two of the 8.8 cm guns were removed and replaced by 8.8 cm anti-aircraft guns. Thüringen was also armed with six 50 cm (19.7 in) submerged torpedo tubes; one was in the bow, one in the stern, and two on each broadside.

Her main armored belt was 300 mm (11.8 in) thick in the central citadel, and was composed of Krupp cemented armor (KCA). Her main battery gun turrets were protected by the same thickness of KCA on the sides and faces, as well as the barbettes that supported the turrets. Thüringen's deck was 63.5 mm (2.5 in) thick.

== Service history ==
Thüringen underway, date unknown

Thüringen was ordered by the German Imperial Navy (Kaiserliche Marine) under the provisional name Ersatz Beowulf, (Note: German warships were ordered under provisional names. Additions to the fleet were given a single letter; ships intended to replace older or lost vessels were ordered as "Ersatz (name of the ship to be replaced)".) as a replacement for the old coastal defense ship Beowulf. The contract for the ship was awarded to the AG Weser dockyard in Bremen under construction number 166. Work began on 2 November 1908 with the laying of her keel, and the ship was launched a year later on 27 November 1909. The ship, named for the Duchy of Thuringia, was christened by Duchess Adelheid von Sachsen-Altenburg, and Grand Duke Wilhelm Ernst gave the speech. Fitting out, including completion of the superstructure and the installation of armament, lasted until June 1911. Following her completion, six pontoon barges were attached to the new battleship to reduce her draft to allow her to be towed down the Weser River to the North Sea. Thüringen, named for Thuringia, a state in central Germany, was commissioned into the High Seas Fleet on 1 June 1911, less than three years after work commenced. The ship's first commander was Kapitän zur See (KzS—Captain at Sea) Hermann Nordmann.

After her commissioning on 1 July 1911, Thüringen conducted sea trials, which were completed by 10 September. On 19 September, she was assigned to I Battle Squadron of the High Seas Fleet, alongside her sisters. She then went on to conduct individual ship training exercises, which were followed by I Squadron exercises and then fleet maneuvers in November. The annual summer cruise in July and August, which typically went to Norway, was interrupted by the Agadir Crisis. As a result, the cruise only went into the Baltic. Thüringen and the rest of the fleet then fell into a pattern of individual ship, squadron, and full fleet exercises over the next two years. In October 1913, KzS William Michaelis became the ship's commanding officer; he held the post until February 1915.

On 14 July 1914, the annual summer cruise to Norway began. During the last peacetime cruise of the Imperial Navy, the fleet conducted drills off Skagen before proceeding to the Norwegian fjords on 25 July. The following day the fleet began to steam back to Germany, as a result of Austria-Hungary's ultimatum to Serbia. On 27 July, the entire fleet assembled off Cape Skudenes before returning to port, where they remained at a heightened state of readiness. War between Austria-Hungary and Serbia broke out the following day, and within a week all the major European powers had joined the conflict. By 29 July Thüringen and the rest of I Squadron were back in Wilhelmshaven. During the first year of the war, the future anti-Nazi Lutheran pastor Martin Niemöller served aboard the ship as an officer.

=== World War I ===
The High Seas Fleet's disposition on the morning of 16 December 1914, during the raid on Scarborough, Hartlepool and Whitby

Thüringen was present during the first sortie by the German fleet into the North Sea, which took place on 2–3 November 1914. No British forces were encountered during the operation. A second operation followed on 15–16 December. This sortie was the initiation of a strategy adopted by Admiral Friedrich von Ingenohl, the commander of the High Seas Fleet. Ingenohl intended to use the battlecruisers of Konteradmiral (KAdm—Rear Admiral) Franz von Hipper's I Scouting Group to raid British coastal towns to lure out portions of the Grand Fleet where they could be destroyed by the High Seas Fleet. Early on 15 December the fleet left port to raid the towns of Scarborough, Hartlepool, and Whitby on the English coast. That evening, the German battle fleet of some twelve dreadnoughts—including Thüringen and her three sisters—and eight pre-dreadnoughts came to within 10 nmi (19 km; 12 mi) of an isolated squadron of six British battleships. Skirmishes between the rival destroyer screens in the darkness convinced Ingenohl that he was faced with the entire Grand Fleet. Under orders from Kaiser Wilhelm II to avoid risking the fleet unnecessarily, Ingenohl broke off the engagement and turned the battle fleet back toward Germany.

The Battle of Dogger Bank, in which Vice Admiral David Beatty's 1st and 2nd Battlecruiser Squadrons ambushed the I Scouting Group battlecruisers, occurred on 24 January 1915. Thüringen and the rest of I Squadron were sortied to reinforce the outnumbered German battlecruisers; I Squadron left port at 12:33 CET, (Note: The Germans were on Central European Time, which is one hour ahead of UTC, the time zone commonly used in British works.) along with the pre-dreadnoughts of II Squadron. The High Seas Fleet was too late, so it failed to locate any British forces. By 19:05, the fleet had returned to the Schillig Roads outside Wilhelmshaven. In the meantime, the armored cruiser Blücher had been overwhelmed by concentrated British fire and sunk, while the battlecruiser Seydlitz was severely damaged by an ammunition fire. As a result, Wilhelm II removed Ingenohl from his post and replaced him with Admiral Hugo von Pohl on 2 February. The same month, KzS Hugo Langemak arrived to relieve Michaelis as Thüringen's captain.

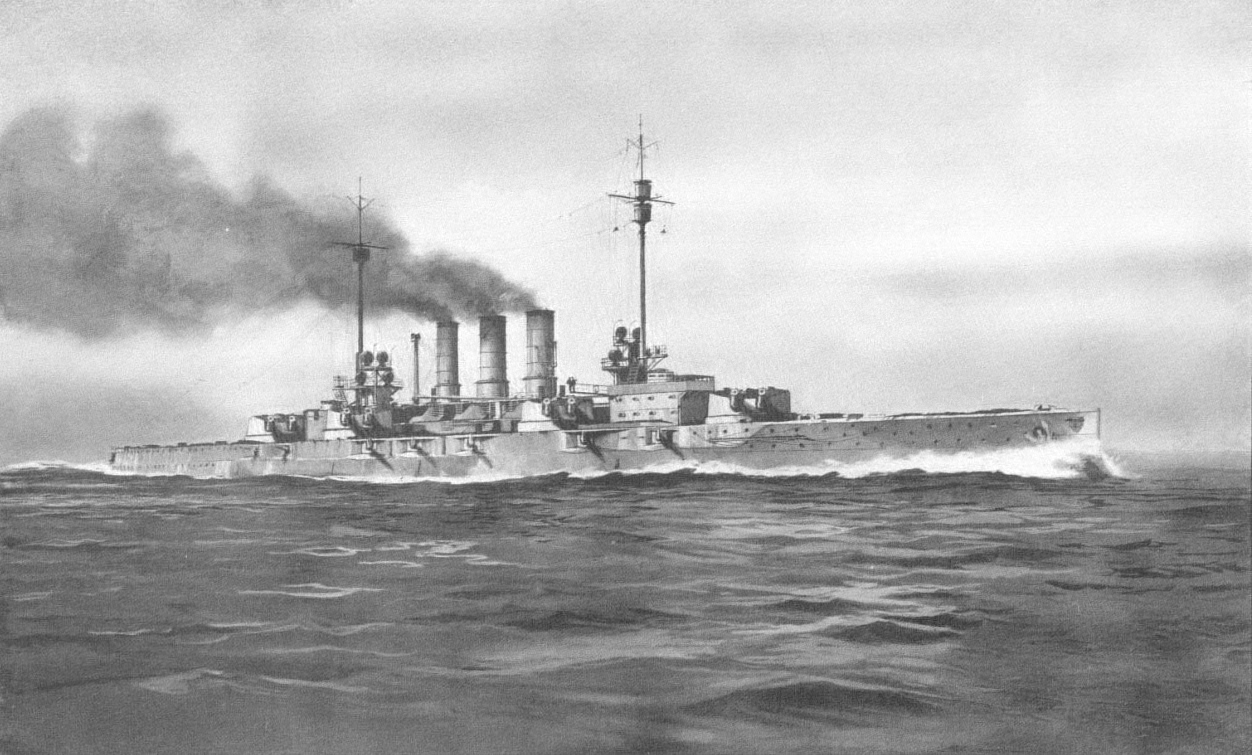
Recognition drawing of a Helgoland-class battleship

The eight I Squadron ships went into the Baltic on 22 February 1915 for unit training, which lasted until 13 March. Following their return to the North Sea, the ships participated in a series of uneventful fleet sorties on 29–30 March, 17–18 April, 21–22 April, 17–18 May, and 29–30 May. Thüringen and the rest of the fleet then remained in port until 4 August, when I Squadron returned to the Baltic for another round of training maneuvers. From there, the squadron was attached to the naval force that attempted to sweep the Gulf of Riga of Russian naval forces in August 1915. The assault force included the eight I Squadron battleships, the battlecruisers Von der Tann, Moltke, and Seydlitz, several light cruisers, 32 destroyers and 13 minesweepers. The plan called for channels to be swept in Russian minefields so that the Russian naval presence, which included the pre-dreadnought Slava, could be eliminated. The Germans would then lay minefields of their own to prevent Russian ships from returning to the Gulf. Thüringen and the majority of the other big ships of the High Seas Fleet remained outside the Gulf for the entirety of the operation. The dreadnoughts Nassau and Posen were detached on 16 August to escort the minesweepers and to destroy Slava, though they failed to sink the old battleship. After three days, the Russian minefields had been cleared, and the flotilla entered the Gulf on 19 August; reports of Allied submarines in the area prompted a German withdrawal from the Gulf the following day. By 26 August, I Squadron had returned to Wilhelmshaven. In September, KzS Hans Küsel replaced Langemak as the ship's captain.

On 23–24 October, the High Seas Fleet undertook its last major offensive operation under the command of Pohl, though it ended without contact with British forces. By January 1916 hepatic cancer had weakened Pohl to the point where he was no longer able to carry out his duties, and he was replaced by Vizeadmiral Reinhard Scheer in January. Scheer proposed a more aggressive policy designed to force a confrontation with the British Grand Fleet; he received approval from the Kaiser in February. Scheer's first operation was a sweep into the North Sea on 5–7 March, followed by two more on 21–22 March and 25–26 March. During Scheer's next operation, Thüringen supported a raid on the English coast on 24 April 1916 conducted by the German battlecruiser force. The battlecruisers left the Jade Estuary at 10:55 and the rest of the High Seas Fleet followed at 13:40. The battlecruiser Seydlitz struck a mine while en route to the target, and had to withdraw. The other battlecruisers bombarded the town of Lowestoft unopposed, but during the approach to Yarmouth, they encountered the British cruisers of the Harwich Force. A short gun duel ensued before the Harwich Force withdrew. Reports of British submarines in the area prompted the retreat of I Scouting Group. At this point, Scheer, who had been warned of the sortie of the Grand Fleet from its base in Scapa Flow, also withdrew to safer German waters.

==== Battle of Jutland ====
Maps showing the maneuvers of the British (blue) and German (red) fleets on 31 May – 1 June 1916

Thüringen was present during the fleet operation that resulted in the battle of Jutland which took place on 31 May and 1 June 1916. The German fleet again sought to draw out and isolate a portion of the Grand Fleet and destroy it before the main British fleet could retaliate. During the operation, Thüringen was the second ship in I Division of I Squadron and the tenth ship in the line, directly astern of the squadron flagship Ostfriesland and ahead of another sister Helgoland. I Squadron was the center of the German line, behind the eight König- and Kaiser-class battleships of III Squadron. The six elderly pre-dreadnoughts of III and IV Divisions, II Battle Squadron, formed the rear of the formation.

Shortly before 16:00, the battlecruisers of I Scouting Group encountered the British 1st Battlecruiser Squadron under the command of David Beatty. The opposing ships began an artillery duel that saw the destruction of Indefatigable, shortly after 17:00, and Queen Mary, less than half an hour later. By this time, the German battlecruisers were steaming south to draw the British ships toward the main body of the High Seas Fleet. At 17:30, the crew of the leading German battleship, König, spotted both I Scouting Group and the 1st Battlecruiser Squadron approaching. The German battlecruisers were steaming to starboard, while the British ships steamed to port. At 17:45, Scheer ordered a two-point turn to port to bring his ships closer to the British battlecruisers, and a minute later, the order to open fire was given. (Note: The compass can be divided into 32 points, each corresponding to 11.25 degrees. A two-point turn to port would alter the ships' course by 22.5 degrees.)

While the leading battleships engaged the British battlecruiser squadron, Thüringen and ten other battleships, too far out of range to attack the British battlecruisers, fired on the British 2nd Light Cruiser Squadron. Thüringen and Kronprinz engaged the cruiser Dublin, though both ships failed to score a hit. Thüringen fired for eight minutes at ranges of 18,600 to 20,800 yd (17,000 to 19,000 m), expending twenty-nine 30.5 cm shells. The British destroyers Nestor and Nomad, which had been disabled earlier in the engagement, laid directly in the path of the advancing High Seas Fleet. Thüringen and three other battleships destroyed Nestor with their primary and secondary guns while several III Squadron battleships sank Nomad. Shortly after 19:15, the British dreadnought Warspite came into range; Thüringen opened fire at 19:25 with her main and secondary battery guns, at ranges of 10,600 to 11,800 yd (9,700 to 10,800 m). The ship fired twenty-one 30.5 cm and thirty-seven 15 cm shells in the span of five or six minutes, after which Thüringen's gunners lost sight of Warspite, without scoring any hits. They then shifted fire to Malaya. Thüringen fired twenty main battery rounds at Malaya, also unsuccessfully, over seven minutes at a range of 14,100 yd (12,900 m) before conforming to a 180-degree turn ordered by Scheer to disengage from the British fleet.

At around 23:30, the German fleet reorganized into the night-cruising formation. Thüringen was the seventh ship, stationed toward the front of the 24-ship line. An hour later, the leading units of the German line encountered British light forces and a violent firefight at close range ensued. Sometime around 01:10, the armored cruiser Black Prince stumbled into the German line. Thüringen illuminated the vessel with her spotlights and poured salvos of 30.5 cm rounds into the ship at point-blank range. The first salvo struck near Black Prince's rear gun turret, which appears to have been blown overboard. Thüringen fired a total of ten 30.5 cm, twenty-seven 15 cm, and twenty-four 8.8 cm shells. She was joined by three other battleships, and Black Prince was soon destroyed by a huge ammunition explosion. Around a half an hour later, Thüringen spotted what appeared to be a Birkenhead-class cruiser. She fired a star shell to illuminate the British cruiser and opened fire with her secondary guns. The ship was actually the destroyer Turbulent. Thüringen fired eighteen 15 cm and six 8.8 cm shells before launching another star shell. Turbulent appeared to be capsized to starboard, though she remained afloat and was dispatched later by the cruiser Regensburg and the destroyers V71 and V73.

Despite the ferocity of the night fighting, the High Seas Fleet punched through the British destroyer forces and reached Horns Reef by 04:00 on 1 June. A few hours later, the fleet arrived in the Jade; Thüringen, Helgoland, Nassau, and Westfalen took up defensive positions in the outer roadstead and four undamaged III Squadron ships anchored just outside the entrance locks to Wilhelmshaven. The remaining eight dreadnoughts entered port, where those that were still in fighting condition restocked ammunition and fuel. In the course of the engagement, Thüringen had fired one-hundred and seven 30.5 cm, one-hundred and fifteen 15 cm, and twenty-two 8.8 cm shells, while she and her crew emerged from the battle unscathed.

==== Subsequent operations ====
On 18 August, now-Admiral Scheer attempted to repeat the 31 May operation. The two serviceable German battlecruisers (Moltke and Von der Tann), supported by three dreadnoughts, would bombard Sunderland in an attempt to draw out and destroy Beatty's battlecruisers. (Note: Derfflinger and Seydlitz had been seriously damaged at the Battle of Jutland, and Lützow had been sunk.) The rest of the fleet, including Thüringen, would trail behind and provide cover. British signals intelligence informed Jellicoe of the German departure later in the day, and he sent the Grand Fleet out to intercept the Germans. On the approach to the English coast during the action of 19 August 1916, Scheer turned north after receiving a false report from a zeppelin about a British unit in the area. As a result, the bombardment was not carried out, and by 14:35 on 19 August, Scheer had been warned of the Grand Fleet's approach and so turned his forces around and retreated to German ports.

On 25–26 September, Thüringen and the rest of I Squadron covered an advance conducted by the second commander of the torpedo-boat flotillas (II Führer der Torpedoboote) to the Terschelling Bank. Scheer conducted another fleet operation on 18–20 October in the direction of the Dogger Bank, though rudder damage prevented Thüringen from participating. The operation led to a brief action on 19 October, during which a British submarine torpedoed the cruiser München. The failure of the operation (coupled with the action of 19 August) convinced the German naval command to abandon its aggressive fleet strategy in favor of a resumption of the unrestricted submarine warfare campaign.

For the majority of 1917, Thüringen was assigned to guard duty in the German Bight. In October, KzS Hans Herr took command of the ship. During Operation Albion, the amphibious assault on the Russian-held islands in the Gulf of Riga, Thüringen and her three sisters were moved to the Danish Straits to block any possible British attempt to intervene. On 28 October the four ships arrived in Putzig Wiek, and from there steamed to Arensburg on the 29th. On 2 November the operation was completed and Thüringen and her sisters began the voyage back to the North Sea. A final abortive fleet sortie took place on 23–24 April 1918. Thüringen, Ostfriesland, and Nassau were formed into a special unit for Operation Schlußstein, a planned occupation of St. Petersburg. The three ships reached the Baltic on 10 August, but the operation was postponed and eventually canceled. The special unit was dissolved on 21 August and the battleships were back in Wilhelmshaven on the 23rd.

=== Fate ===
Thüringen and her three sisters were to have taken part in a final fleet action at the end of October 1918, days before the Armistice was to take effect. The bulk of the High Seas Fleet was to have sortied from their base in Wilhelmshaven to engage the British Grand Fleet; Scheer—by now the Grand Admiral (Großadmiral) of the fleet—intended to inflict as much damage as possible on the British navy, to improve Germany's bargaining position, despite the expected casualties. But many of the war-weary sailors felt that the operation would disrupt the peace process and prolong the war. On the morning of 29 October 1918, the order was given to sail from Wilhelmshaven the following day. Starting on the night of 29 October, sailors on Thüringen and then on several other battleships mutinied. Stokers turned off the boilers and refused to work. The following day, the torpedo boats B110 and B112 came alongside and the U-boat U-135 pointed her guns at the ship. A significant portion of the crew, 314 sailors and 124 stokers, were arrested and taken off the ship. This was not enough to stop the mutiny, which quickly spread throughout the fleet. The unrest ultimately forced Hipper and Scheer to cancel the operation. Informed of the situation, the Kaiser stated "I no longer have a navy".

Following the German collapse that had resulted in the Armistice of 11 November 1918, a significant portion of the High Seas Fleet was interned in Scapa Flow. Oldenburg and her three sisters were not among the ships listed for internment, so they remained at German ports. Thüringen was decommissioned on 16 December 1918 and used as a barracks ship while she remained in Germany. Under the terms of the Treaty of Versailles that formally ended the war in June 1919, Oldenburg and the other dreadnoughts that had remained in Germany were to be surrendered to the Allies under Article 185 as prizes of war. Negotiations between the Allies over which country received what vessels, and what those ships could be used for began in November. Thüringen was struck from the German naval list on 5 November. While final decisions were still being made, the Allies decided that the ships in question were to sail to either a British or French port, and accordingly, on 24 April 1920, Thüringen initially sailed for Brest, France, but she had to be diverted to Cherbourg on the way, arriving on 25 April. The German transfer crew had reported that only three of her fifteen boilers were operable, and had apparently attempted to scuttle the ship, as a significant amount of water had been found in the hull upon her arrival.

Thüringen was surrendered to the French Navy on 29 April under the name "L", and she was towed to Brest in February 1921 to be completely disarmed. The hulk was then towed to Gâvres, beached, and then used as a target ship in weapons tests. These included observing how fire spread after shell hits. The tests lasted through the summer months, and later in 1921, the wreck broke in half. Sold for scrap in February 1923, the wreck was partially broken up in situ between 1923 and 1933. During this period, the French Navy occasionally used the remnants as a target. A section of the hull 100 m (330 ft) long still remains about 200 m (660 ft) from shore, and the tops of the engines can be seen at low tide.
