= SMS Helgoland (1909) =

Battleship of the German Imperial Navy

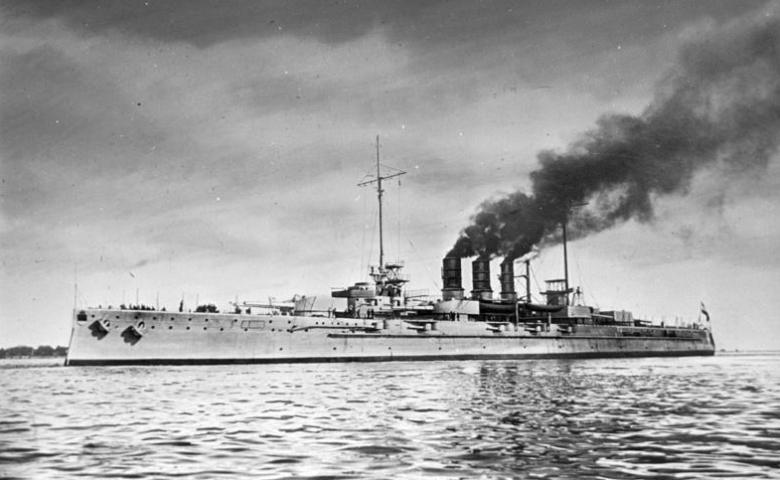
- SMS Helgoland c. 1911–1917

History

German Empire
- Name: Helgoland
- Namesake: Heligoland
- Builder: Howaldtswerke, Kiel
- Laid down: 11 November 1908
- Launched: 25 September 1909
- Commissioned: 23 August 1911
- Decommissioned: 16 December 1918
- Stricken: 5 November 1919
- Fate: Ceded to Great Britain in 1920. Scrapped in 1921

General characteristics
- Class & type: Helgoland-class battleship
- Displacement: Normal: 22,808 t (22,448 long tons); Full load: 24,700 t (24,300 long tons)
- Length: 167.20 m (548 ft 7 in)
- Beam: 28.50 m (93 ft 6 in)
- Draft: 8.94 m (29 ft 4 in)
- Installed power: 15 × water-tube boilers; 28,000 PS (28,000 ihp)
- Propulsion: 3 × triple-expansion steam engines; 3 × screw propellers
- Speed: 20.8 knots (38.5 km/h; 23.9 mph)
- Range: 5,500 nautical miles (10,190 km; 6,330 mi) at 10 knots (19 km/h; 12 mph)
- Complement: 42 officers; 1071 enlisted
- Armament: 12 × 30.5 cm (12 in) SK L/50 guns; 14 × 15 cm (5.9 in) SK L/45 guns; 14 × 8.8 cm (3.5 in) SK L/45 guns; 6 × 50 cm (19.7 in) torpedo tubes
- Armor: Belt: 300 mm (11.8 in); Turrets: 300 mm; Deck: 63.5 mm (2.50 in)

SMS Helgoland, (Note: "SMS" stands for "Seiner Majestät Schiff" (German: His Majesty's Ship).) the lead ship of her class, was a dreadnought battleship of the German Imperial Navy. Helgoland's design represented an incremental improvement over the preceding Nassau class, including an increase in the caliber of the main guns, from 28 cm (11 in) to 30.5 cm (12 in). Her keel was laid down on 11 November 1908 at the Howaldtswerke shipyards in Kiel. Helgoland was launched on 25 September 1909 and was commissioned on 23 August 1911.

Like most battleships of the High Seas Fleet, Helgoland saw limited action against Britain's Royal Navy during World War I. The ship participated in several fruitless sweeps into the North Sea as the covering force for the battlecruisers of the I Scouting Group. She saw some limited duty in the Baltic Sea against the Russian Navy, including serving as part of a support force during the Battle of the Gulf of Riga in August 1915. Helgoland was present at the Battle of Jutland on 31 May – 1 June 1916, though she was located in the center of the German line of battle and not as heavily engaged as the König- and Kaiser-class ships in the lead. Helgoland was ceded to Great Britain at the end of the war and broken up for scrap in the early 1920s. Her coat of arms is preserved in the Military History Museum of the Bundeswehr in Dresden.

== Design ==
Many senior officers in the German Kaiserliche Marine (Imperial Navy) acknowledged that the Nassau-class battleships, armed with 28 cm (11 in) guns, were inferior to their British counterparts that carried 30.5 cm (12 in) guns. They sought to incorporate guns of the latter caliber in the next battleship design, though the significant increase in cost from the pre-dreadnought Deutschland-class battleships to the dreadnought Nassau class precluded another major qualitative increase until the 1908 budget year, two years after the first Nassaus were ordered. The design staff experimented with a variety of gun turret arrangements, including superfiring layouts like the American South Carolina class, but they ultimately settled on the same hexagonal arrangement of the Nassaus.

=== Characteristics ===
Plan and profile drawing of the Helgoland class

The ship was 167.2 m (548 ft 7 in) long, had a beam of 28.5 m (93 ft 6 in) and a draft of 8.94 m (29 ft 4 in), and displaced 24,700 metric tons (24,310 long tons) at full load. Helgoland had a flush deck and minimal superstructure that consisted primarily of a large, armored conning tower forward and a smaller, secondary conning position further aft. The ship was fitted with a pair of pole masts, which held spotting tops and positions for searchlights. She had a crew of 42 officers and 1,071 enlisted men.

She was powered by three triple-expansion steam engines, which produced a top speed of 20.8 knots (38.5 km/h; 23.9 mph). Steam was provided by fifteen water-tube boilers, which were vented through three closely spaced funnels placed amidships. Helgoland stored up to 3,200 metric tons (3,100 long tons) of coal, which allowed her to steam for 5,500 nautical miles (10,200 km; 6,300 mi) at a speed of 10 knots (19 km/h; 12 mph). After 1915 the boilers were modified to burn oil; the ship could carry up to 197 metric tons (194 long tons) of fuel oil.

Helgoland was armed with a main battery of twelve 30.5 cm (12 in) SK L/50 (Note: In Imperial German Navy gun nomenclature, "SK" (Schnelladekanone) denotes that the gun is quick firing, while the L/50 denotes the length of the gun. In this case, the L/50 gun is 50 caliber, meaning that the gun is 50 times as long as its diameter.) guns in six twin gun turrets, with one turret fore, one aft, and two on each flank of the ship. The ship's secondary battery consisted of fourteen 15 cm (5.9 in) SK L/45 guns, all of which were mounted in casemates in the side of the upper deck. For defense against torpedo boats, she carried fourteen 8.8 cm (3.5 in) SK L/45 guns. After 1914, two of the 8.8 cm guns were removed and replaced by 8.8 cm anti-aircraft guns. Helgoland was also armed with six 50 cm (19.7 in) submerged torpedo tubes; one was in the bow, one in the stern, and two on each broadside.

Her main armored belt was 300 mm (11.8 in) thick in the central citadel, and was composed of Krupp cemented armor (KCA). Her main battery gun turrets were protected by the same thickness of KCA on the sides and faces, as well as the barbettes that supported the turrets. Helgoland's deck was 63.5 mm (2.5 in) thick.

== Service history ==
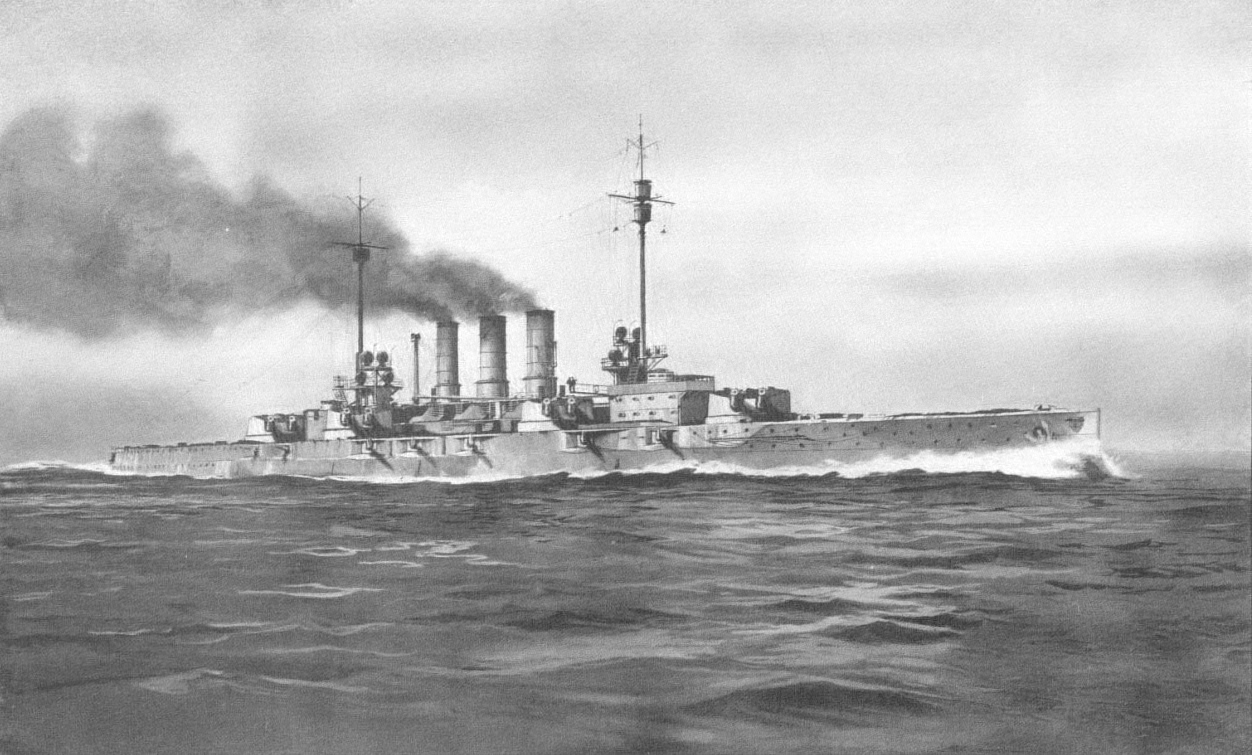
Recognition drawing of a Helgoland-class battleship

Helgoland was ordered by the German Imperial Navy (Kaiserliche Marine) under the provisional name Ersatz Siegfried, (Note: German warships were ordered under provisional names. Additions to the fleet were given a single letter; ships intended to replace older or lost vessels were ordered as "Ersatz (name of the ship to be replaced)".) as a replacement for the old coastal defense ship Siegfried. The contract for the ship was awarded to Howaldtswerke in Kiel under construction number 500. Work began on 24 December 1908 with the laying of her keel, and the ship was launched less than a year later, on 25 September 1909. Ernst Günther II, Duke of Schleswig-Holstein, gave a speech at the launching ceremony, and his wife, Princess Dorothea, christened the ship Helgoland, named for the offshore islands seen as vital to the defense of the Kiel Canal. Fitting out, including completion of the superstructure and the installation of armament, lasted until August 1911. Builder's trials began early that month, and were completed satisfactorily by 23 August, when Helgoland was commissioned into active service to begin sea trials on 23 August 1911, just under three years from when work commenced. Her first commander was Kapitän zur See (KzS—Captain at Sea) Friedrich Gädeke, though the following month, he was replaced by KzS Gottfried von Dalwigk zu Lichtenfels. The ship's activation was initially kept secret to avoid increasing tensions over the on-going Agadir Crisis. Trials were concluded on 19 December, and the following day, she arrived in Wilhelmshaven, where she joined I Battle Squadron, replacing the pre-dreadnought Hannover.

On 9 February 1912, Helgoland's crew beat the German record for loading coal, taking 1,100 tons of coal on board in two hours; the record was previously held by the crew of the Nassau-class battleship Posen. Kaiser Wilhelm II congratulated the crew through a Cabinet order. In March, fleet training maneuvers were conducted in the North Sea, followed by a cruise along the German Baltic Sea coast. A routine voyage to Norwegian waters was cancelled that year due to political tensions in Europe, which remained high even after the conclusion of the Agadir crisis. Another round of exercises in the North Sea, Skagerrak, and Kattegat took place in November. The next year followed a similar training pattern, though a summer cruise to Norway was instituted. On 23 May 1913, Helgoland was present for the dedication of a memorial stone to German sailors who had died in the area in recent years, including men from the torpedo boats G171 and S178, the salvage ship Unterelbe, and the Zeppelin L1. In September, KzS Ulrich Lübbert took command of the ship.

On 10 July 1914, Helgoland left the Jade Estuary to take part in the annual summer training cruise to Norway. The fleet, along with several German U-boats, assembled at Skagen on 12 July to practice torpedo boat attacks, individual ship maneuvers, and searchlight techniques. The fleet arrived at the Fjord of Songe by 18 July, but Helgoland had to wait until after midnight for a harbor pilot to guide her into the confined waters of the fjord. Helgoland joined Friedrich der Grosse, the light cruiser Magdeburg, and the Kaiser's yacht Hohenzollern in Balholm. That same day, Helgoland took on 1250 tons of coal from a Norwegian collier. The following morning Helgoland was joined by her sister Oldenburg, and the two ships sailed back to Germany, arriving on the morning of 22 July. On the evening of 1 August, the captain announced to the crew that the Kaiser had ordered the navy to prepare for hostilities with the Russian Navy.

=== World War I ===
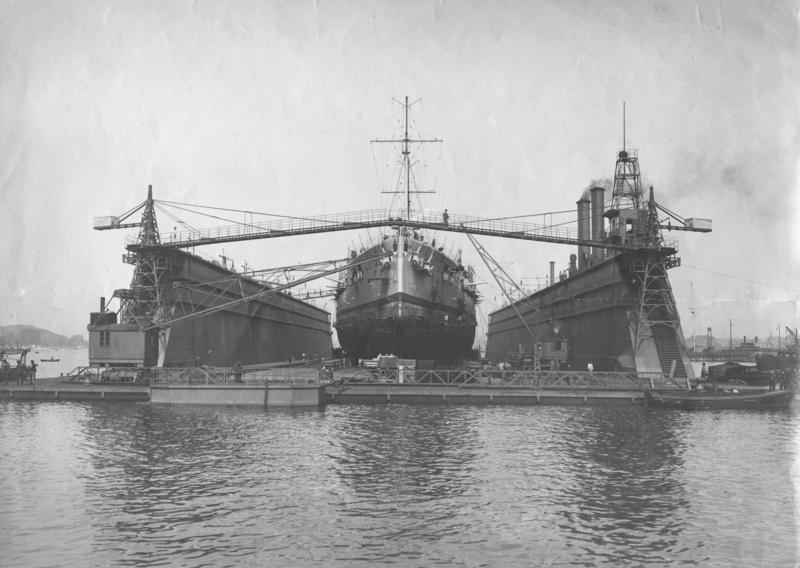
Helgoland in a floating dry dock

==== 1914 ====
At the start of World War I, Helgoland was assigned to I Division, I Battle Squadron. Helgoland was stationed off the heavily fortified island of Wangerooge on 9 August. Minefields and picket lines of cruisers, torpedo boats, and submarines were also emplaced there to defend Wilhelmshaven. Helgoland's engines were kept running for the entirety of her deployment, so that she would be ready to respond at a moment's notice. Four days later, on 13 August, Helgoland returned to Wilhelmshaven to refuel. The following day, naval reservists began arriving to fill out the wartime complements for the German battleships.

The first major naval action in the North Sea, the Battle of Helgoland Bight, took place on 28 August 1914. Helgoland was again stationed off Wangerooge. Despite her proximity to the battle, Helgoland was not sent to aid the beleaguered German cruisers, as she could not be risked in an unsupported attack against possibly superior British forces. Instead, the ship was ordered to drop anchor and await relief by Thüringen. By 04:30, Helgoland received the order to join Ostfriesland and sail out of the harbor. At 05:00, the two battleships met the battered cruisers Frauenlob and Stettin. By 07:30, the ships had returned to port for the night. Three days later, on 31 August, Helgoland was put into drydock for maintenance. On the afternoon of 7 September, Helgoland and the rest of the High Seas Fleet conducted a training cruise to the main island of Helgoland. Helgoland and the rest of the High Seas Fleet sortied to support the battlecruisers of I Scouting Group during their raid on Yarmouth on 2–3 November, though the battleships did not take direct part in the operation.

The High Seas Fleet's disposition on the morning of 16 December

The first major operation of the war in which Helgoland took part was the raid on Scarborough, Hartlepool and Whitby on 15–16 December 1914. The raid was conducted by the battlecruisers of I Scouting Group; Helgoland and the other dreadnoughts of the High Seas Fleet steamed in distant support of Franz von Hipper's battlecruisers. Friedrich von Ingenohl, the commander of the High Seas Fleet, decided to take up station in the middle of the North Sea, about 130 miles east of Scarborough. The Royal Navy, which had recently received the German code books recovered from the beached cruiser Magdeburg, was aware that an operation was taking place, but was not sure where the Germans would strike. Therefore, the Admiralty ordered David Beatty's 1st Battlecruiser Squadron, the six battleships of the 2nd Battle Squadron, and several cruisers and destroyers to intercept the German battlecruisers.

Instead, on the morning of 16 December, Beatty's task force nearly ran headlong into the entire High Seas Fleet. At 06:20, Beatty's destroyer screen came into contact with the German torpedo boat SMS V155. This began a confused, 2-hour battle between the British destroyers and the German cruiser and destroyer screen, often at very close range. At the time of the first encounter, the Helgoland-class battleships were less than 10 nautical miles (19 km; 12 mi) away from the six British dreadnoughts; this was nearly within firing range, but in the darkness, neither British nor German admirals were aware of the composition of their opponents' fleets. Ingenohl, aware of the Kaiser's order not to risk the battle fleet without his express approval, concluded that his forces were engaging the screen of the entire Grand Fleet, and so, 10 minutes after the first contact, he ordered a turn to the southeast. Continued attacks delayed the turn, but by 06:42, it had been carried out. For about 40 minutes, the two fleets were steaming on a parallel course. At 07:20, Ingenohl ordered a further turn to port, which put his ships on a course for the safety of German bases.

==== 1915–1916 ====
Helgoland's bridge and forward main battery turrets

On 17 January 1915, Ingenohl ordered Helgoland to go back to the docks for more maintenance, but she did not enter the drydock until three days later, owing to difficulties getting through the canal locks. By the middle of the month, Helgoland left dock; her berth was then filled by the armored cruiser SMS Roon. While the ship was in the shipyard, the Germans had been defeated at the Battle of Dogger Bank, which saw the sinking of the large armored cruiser SMS Blücher. The Kaiser removed Ingenohl from his post on 2 February and Admiral Hugo von Pohl replaced him as commander of the fleet.

On 10 February, Helgoland and the rest of I Squadron sailed out of Wilhelmshaven towards Cuxhaven, but heavy fog impeded movement for two days. The ships then anchored off Brunsbüttel before proceeding through the Kiel Canal to Kiel. The crews conducted gunnery training with the main and secondary guns and torpedo firing practice on 1 March. The following night the crews conducted night-fighting training. On 10 March the squadron again passed through the locks to return to Wilhelmshaven. Fog again slowed progress, and the ships did not reach port until 15 March. The High Seas Fleet carried out a sweep into the North Sea on 29–30 March, which failed to locate any enemy warships. Further such fleet operations were performed on 17–18 and 21–22 April and 17–18 and 29–30 May, all of which similarly ended without contact with British naval forces.

Helgoland, her three sister ships, and the four Nassau-class battleships were assigned to the task force that was to cover the foray into the Gulf of Riga in August 1915. The German flotilla, which was under the command of Hipper, also included the battlecruisers Von der Tann, Moltke, and Seydlitz, several light cruisers, 32 destroyers and 13 minesweepers. The plan for the Battle of the Gulf of Riga called for channels in Russian minefields to be swept so that the Russian naval presence, which included the pre-dreadnought battleship Slava, could be eliminated. The Germans would then lay minefields of their own to prevent Russian ships from returning to the gulf. Helgoland and the majority of the other big ships of the High Seas Fleet remained outside the gulf for the entirety of the operation. The dreadnoughts Nassau and Posen were detached on 16 August to escort the minesweepers and to destroy Slava, though they failed to sink the old battleship. After three days, the Russian minefields had been cleared, and the flotilla entered the gulf on 19 August, but reports of Allied submarines in the area prompted a German withdrawal from the gulf the following day.

Helgoland and the rest of the main fleet units then returned to the North Sea, where they resumed the fleet operations carried out under Pohl. These included sorties on 11–12 September, 23–24 October, and 16 December. Once again, the Germans could not locate British naval forces. During this period, in October, KzS Friedrich von Kameke replaced Lübbert as the ship's commander. Fleet operations continued from the Spring on 1916, beginning with a sortie to cover the return of the auxiliary cruiser Möwe on 4 March. The High Seas Fleet carried out patrols in the North Sea on 5–7 and 25–26 March and 21–22 April. Another battlecruiser operation, the bombardment of Yarmouth, took place on 24–25 April; once again, Helgoland and the rest of the High Seas Fleet cruised in support.

===== Battle of Jutland =====
Maps showing the maneuvers of the British (blue) and German (red) fleets on 31 May – 1 June 1916

Helgoland next went to sea on 31 May during a fleet operation that resulted in the Battle of Jutland later that day. She fought alongside her sister ships in I Battle Squadron. For the majority of the battle, I Battle Squadron formed the center of the line of battle, behind Konteradmiral (KAdm—Rear Admiral) Paul Behncke's III Battle Squadron, and followed by KAdm Franz Mauve's elderly pre-dreadnoughts of II Battle Squadron.

Helgoland and her sisters first entered direct combat shortly after 18:00. The German line was steaming northward and encountered the destroyers Nomad and Nestor, which had been disabled earlier in the battle. Nomad, which had been attacked by the Kaiser-class ships at the head of the line, exploded and sank at 18:30, followed five minutes later by the Nestor, sunk by main and secondary gunfire from Helgoland, Thüringen and several other German battleships. At 19:20, Helgoland and several other battleships began firing on HMS Warspite, which, along with the other Queen Elizabeth-class battleships of the 5th Battle Squadron, had been pursuing the German battlecruiser force. The shooting stopped quickly though, as the Germans lost sight of their target; Helgoland had fired only about 20 shells from her main guns.

At 20:15, during the third Gefechtskehrtwendung, (Note: This translates roughly as the "battle about-turn", and was a simultaneous 16-point turn of the entire High Seas Fleet. It had never been conducted under enemy fire before the Battle of Jutland.) Helgoland was struck by a 15-inch (38 cm) armor-piercing (AP) shell, from either Barham or Valiant, in the forward part of the ship. The shell hit the armored belt about 0.8 m (32 in) above the waterline, where the armor was only 15 cm thick. The 15-inch shell broke up on impact, but it still managed to tear a 1.4-meter (4 ft 7 in) hole in the hull. It rained splinters on the foremost port side 15 cm gun, though it could still be fired. Approximately 80 tons of water entered the ship.

By 23:30, the High Seas Fleet had entered its night cruising formation. The order had largely been inverted, with the four Nassau-class ships in the lead, followed directly by the Helgolands, with the Kaisers and Königs astern of them. The rear was again brought up by the elderly pre-dreadnoughts; the mauled German battlecruisers were by this time scattered. At around midnight on 1 June, the Helgoland- and Nassau-class ships in the center of the German line came into contact with the British 4th Destroyer Flotilla. The 4th Flotilla broke off the action temporarily to regroup, but at around 01:00, unwittingly stumbled into the German dreadnoughts a second time. Helgoland and Oldenburg opened fire on the two leading British destroyers. Helgoland fired six salvos from her secondary guns at the destroyer Fortune before she succumbed to the tremendous battering. Shortly after, Helgoland shifted fire to an unidentified destroyer; Helgoland fired five salvos from her 15 cm guns to unknown effect. The British destroyers launched torpedoes at the German ships, but they managed to successfully evade them with a turn to starboard.

Despite the ferocity of the night fighting, the High Seas Fleet punched through the British destroyer forces and reached Horns Reef by 04:00 on 1 June. A few hours later, the fleet arrived in the Jade; Helgoland and Thüringen, along with the Nassau-class battleships Nassau, Posen, and Westfalen took up defensive positions in the outer roadstead and four undamaged III Squadron ships anchored just outside the entrance locks to Wilhelmshaven. The remaining eight dreadnoughts entered port, where those that were still in fighting condition restocked ammunition and fuel. During the battle, the ship suffered only minor damage; Helgoland was hit by a single 15-inch shell, but sustained minimal damage. Nevertheless, dry-docking was required to repair the hole in the belt armor. Work was completed by 16 June. In the course of the battle, Helgoland had fired 63 main battery shells, and 61 rounds from her 15 cm guns. Helgoland was repaired in Wilhelmshaven from 3 to 16 June, after which she returned to local defensive patrols in the North Sea.

==== Later career ====
Another fleet advance followed on 18–22 August, during which the I Scouting Group battlecruisers were to bombard the coastal town of Sunderland in an attempt to draw out and destroy Beatty's battlecruisers. As only two of the four German battlecruisers were still in fighting condition, three dreadnoughts were assigned to the Scouting Group for the operation: Markgraf, Grosser Kurfürst, and the newly commissioned Bayern. The High Seas Fleet, including Helgoland, would trail behind and provide cover. At 06:00 on 19 August, Westfalen was torpedoed by the British submarine HMS E23 55 nautical miles (102 km; 63 mi) north of Terschelling; the ship remained afloat and was detached to return to port. The British were aware of the German plans and sortied the Grand Fleet to meet them. By 14:35, Scheer had been warned of the Grand Fleet's approach and, unwilling to engage the whole of the Grand Fleet just 11 weeks after the close call at Jutland, turned his forces around and retreated to German ports. The ship participated in another major fleet operation on 18–20 October. The operation led to a brief action on 19 October, during which a British submarine torpedoed the cruiser München. The failure of the operation (coupled with the action of 19 August) convinced the German naval command to abandon its aggressive fleet strategy in favor of a resumption of the unrestricted submarine warfare campaign.

In April 1917, Helgoland accidentally rammed the new battlecruiser Hindenburg, which was in the process of fitting-out, as she left her berth. The ships were only lightly damaged in the incident. In October 1917 Helgoland, in company with Oldenburg, went to Amrum to receive the light cruisers Brummer and Bremse, which were returning from a raid on a British convoy to Norway. On 27 November the ship traversed the Kaiser Wilhelm Canal into the Baltic, but did not participate in Operation Albion, the occupation of the islands in the Gulf of Riga. She instead remained in the Putziger Wiek in eastern Germany until early November, when she was ordered back to Kiel. She then passed back to the North Sea, arriving in the German Bight on 8 November. There, she resumed local defensive operations; she spent the rest of the year and into 1918 with these activities, particularly guarding minesweepers keeping channels open in the North Sea.

On 23–24 April, the ship participated in an abortive fleet operation to attack British convoys to Norway. German attacks on shipping between Britain and Norway, which had begun in late 1917, prompted the Grand Fleet to begin escorting convoys with a detached battle squadron. This decision presented the Germans with the opportunity for which they had been waiting the entire war: a portion of the numerically stronger Grand Fleet was separated and could be isolated and destroyed. I Scouting Group, II Scouting Group, and II Torpedo-Boat Flotilla, would attack one of the large convoys while the rest of the High Seas Fleet would stand by, ready to attack the British battle squadron when it intervened. The Germans failed to locate the convoy, which had in fact sailed the day before the fleet left port. As a result, the Germans broke off the operation and returned to port. Kameke briefly served as the deputy commander of I Battle Squadron twice, from 3 to 7 August, and then again from 10 to 23 August, as he was the senior-most captain in the unit at that time. Later that month, KzS Eberhard Heydel became the ship's captain, though he remained aboard for just a month, before he was replaced by KzS Luppe, who was the ship's final commander.

Helgoland and her three sisters were to have taken part in a final fleet action days before the Armistice was to take effect. The bulk of the High Seas Fleet was to have sortied from their base in Wilhelmshaven to engage the British Grand Fleet; Scheer—by now the Grand Admiral (Großadmiral) of the fleet—intended to inflict as much damage as possible on the British navy, in order to retain a better bargaining position for Germany, despite the expected casualties. However, many of the war-weary sailors felt the operation would disrupt the peace process and prolong the war. On the morning of 29 October 1918, the order was given to sail from Wilhelmshaven the following day. Starting on the night of 29 October, sailors on Thüringen and then on several other battleships mutinied.

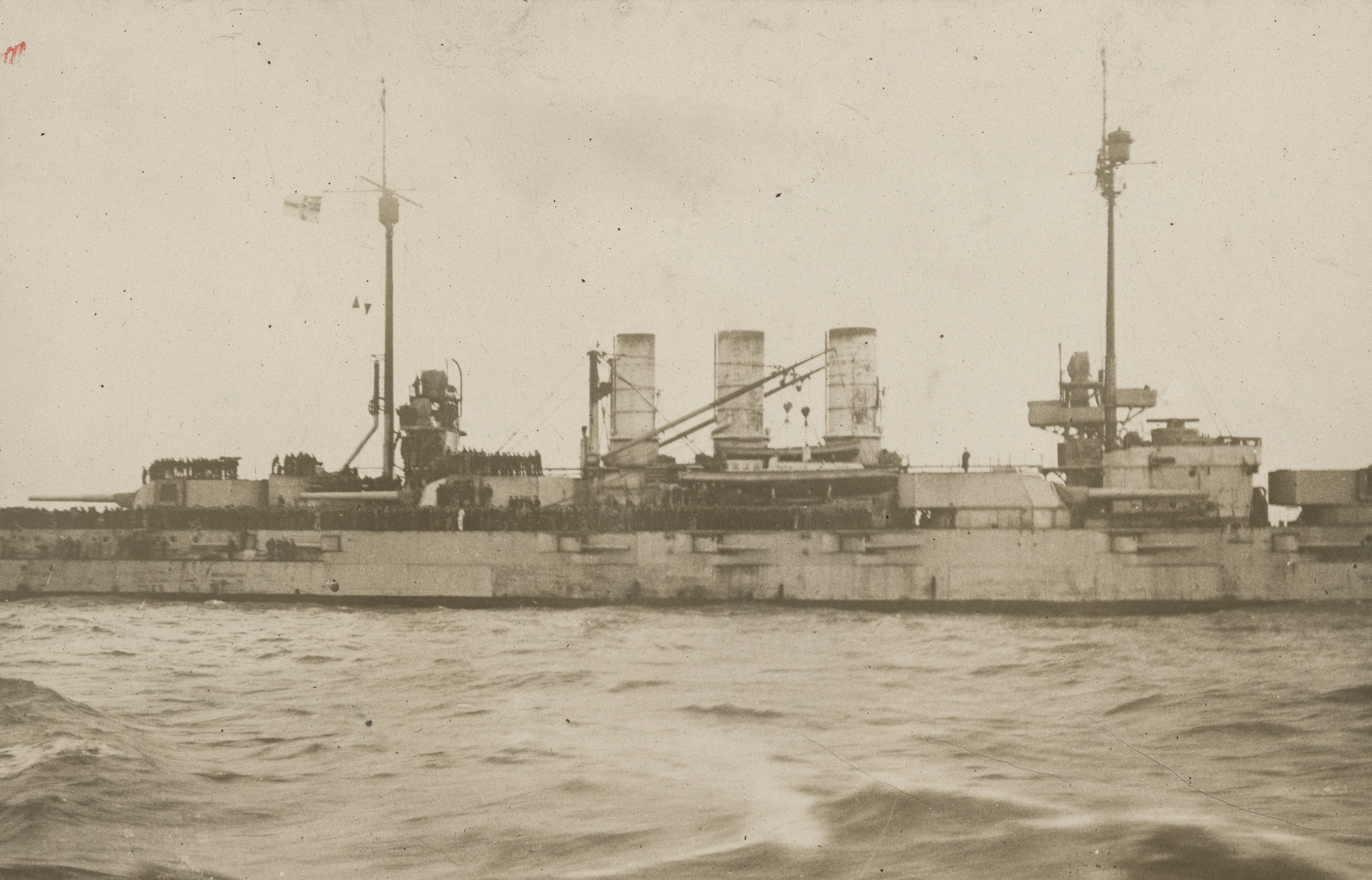
Helgoland underway with crews from German ships interned at Scapa Flow after the end of the war

Early on the 30th, the crew of Helgoland, which was directly behind Thüringen in the harbor, joined in the mutiny. The I Squadron commander sent boats to Helgoland and Thüringen to take off the ships' officers, who were allowed to leave unharmed. He then informed the rebellious crews that if they failed to stand down, both ships would be torpedoed. After two torpedo boats arrived on the scene, both ships surrendered; their crews were taken ashore and incarcerated. The rebellion then spread ashore; on 3 November, an estimated 20,000 sailors, dock workers, and civilians fought a battle in Kiel in an attempt to secure the release of the jailed mutineers. By 5 November, the red flag of the Socialists flew above every capital ship in Wilhelmshaven save König. The following day, a sailors' council took control of the base, and a train carrying the mutineers from Helgoland and Thüringen was stopped in Cuxhaven, where the men escaped.

==== Fate ====
Under the terms of the armistice with Germany that ended the fighting in World War I on 11 November, most of the High Seas Fleet was to be interned in Scapa Flow, though Helgoland, her sisters, and the Nassaus were permitted to remain in Germany. They were nevertheless to have their guns disabled and placed out of service. Soon thereafter, Helgoland embarked a delegation and took them to Harwich to begin preparations for the surrender of Germany's U-boats there, arriving on 20 November. The following day, she escorted a group of U-boats to internment, and then carried their crews back to Germany. Helgoland was then removed from active service on 16 December.

Under the terms of the Treaty of Versailles that formally ended the war in June 1919, Helgoland and the other dreadnoughts that had remained in Germany were to be surrendered to the Allies under Article 185 as prizes of war. Negotiations between the Allies over which country received what vessels, and what those ships could be used for began in November. Helgoland was struck from the German naval list on 5 November. While final decisions were still being made, the Allies decided that the ships in question were to sail to either a British or French port, and accordingly, on 31 July 1920, Helgoland, Westfalen, and twelve torpedo boats sailed for Rosyth, Britain, arriving on 5 August. She was sold to be scrapped at Thos. W. Ward on 3 March 1921; she arrived in Birkenhead on 29 January 1922 and then moved to Morecambe on 19 November, where she was dismantled. Helgoland's coat of arms is currently preserved in the Military History Museum of the Bundeswehr in Dresden.
