= SMS Oldenburg (1910) =

Battleship of the Imperial German Navy

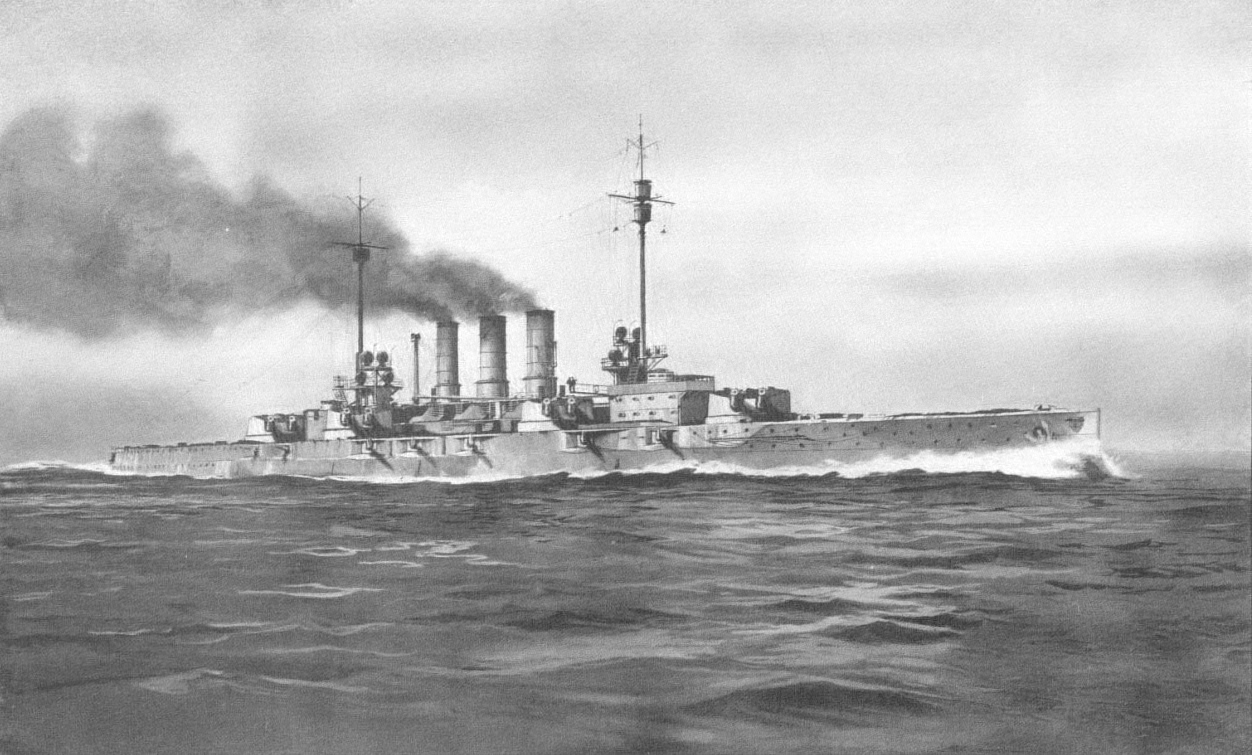
- Recognition drawing of a Helgoland-class battleship

History

German Empire
- Name: Oldenburg
- Namesake: SMS Oldenburg
- Builder: Schichau-Werke, Danzig
- Laid down: 1 March 1909
- Launched: 30 June 1910
- Commissioned: 1 May 1912
- Stricken: 5 November 1919
- Fate: Ceded to Japan, 1920. Broken up for scrap, 1921

General characteristics
- Class & type: Helgoland-class battleship
- Displacement: Normal: 22,808 t (22,448 long tons); Full load: 24,700 t (24,300 long tons)
- Length: 167.20 m (548 ft 7 in)
- Beam: 28.50 m (93 ft 6 in)
- Draft: 8.94 m (29 ft 4 in)
- Installed power: 15 × water-tube boilers; 28,000 PS (28,000 ihp)
- Propulsion: 3 × triple-expansion steam engines; 3 × screw propellers
- Speed: 20.8 knots (38.5 km/h; 23.9 mph)
- Range: 5,500 nautical miles (10,190 km; 6,330 mi) at 10 knots (19 km/h; 12 mph)
- Complement: 42 officers; 1071 enlisted
- Armament: 12 × 30.5 cm (12 in) guns; 14 × 15 cm (5.9 in) guns; 14 × 8.8 cm (3.5 in) guns; 6 × 50 cm (20 in) torpedo tubes
- Armor: Belt: 300 mm (11.8 in); Turrets: 300 mm (11.8 in); Deck: 63.5 mm (2.5 in)

SMS Oldenburg (Note: "SMS" stands for "Seiner Majestät Schiff" ("His Majesty's Ship").) was the fourth vessel of the Helgoland class of dreadnought battleships of the Imperial German Navy. Oldenburg's keel was laid in March 1909 at the Schichau-Werke dockyard in Danzig. She was launched on 30 June 1910 and was commissioned into the fleet on 1 May 1912. The ship was equipped with twelve 30.5 cm (12 in) guns in six twin turrets, and had a top speed of 21.2 knots (39.3 km/h; 24.4 mph). Oldenburg was assigned to I Battle Squadron of the High Seas Fleet for the majority of her career, including World War I.

Along with her three sister ships, Helgoland, Ostfriesland, and Thüringen, Oldenburg participated in all of the major fleet operations of World War I in the North Sea against the British Grand Fleet, including the Battle of Jutland on 31 May and 1 June 1916, the largest naval battle of the war. The ship also saw action in the Baltic Sea against the Imperial Russian Navy. She was present during the unsuccessful first incursion into the Gulf of Riga in August 1915, though she saw no combat during the operation.

After the German collapse in November 1918, most of the High Seas Fleet was interned and then scuttled in Scapa Flow during the peace negotiations. The four Helgoland-class ships were allowed to remain in Germany but eventually ceded to the victorious Allied powers as war reparations; Oldenburg was given to Japan, which sold the vessel to a British ship breaking firm in 1920. She was broken up for scrap in Dordrecht in 1921.

== Design ==
Many senior officers in the German Kaiserliche Marine (Imperial Navy) acknowledged that the Nassau-class battleships, armed with 28 cm (11 in) guns, were inferior to their British counterparts that carried 30.5 cm (12 in) guns. They sought to incorporate guns of the latter caliber in the next battleship design, though the significant increase in cost from the pre-dreadnought Deutschland-class battleships to the dreadnought Nassau class precluded another major qualitative increase until the 1908 budget year, two years after the first Nassaus were ordered. The design staff experimented with a variety of gun turret arrangements, including superfiring layouts like the American South Carolina class, but they ultimately settled on the same hexagonal arrangement of the Nassaus.

=== Characteristics ===
Plan and profile drawing of the Helgoland class

The ship was 167.2 m (548 ft 7 in) long, had a beam of 28.5 m (93 ft 6 in) and a draft of 8.94 m (29 ft 4 in), and displaced 24,700 metric tons (24,310 long tons) at full load. Oldenburg had a flush deck and minimal superstructure that consisted primarily of a large, armored conning tower forward and a smaller, secondary conning position further aft. The ship was fitted with a pair of pole masts, which held spotting tops and positions for searchlights. She had a crew of 42 officers and 1,071 enlisted men.

She was powered by three triple-expansion steam engines. Steam was provided by fifteen water-tube boilers, which were vented through three closely spaced funnels placed amidships. The engines were rated at 28,000 metric horsepower (27,617 ihp; 20,594 kW) and were capable of producing a top speed of 20.8 knots (38.5 km/h; 23.9 mph). Oldenburg stored up to 3,200 metric tons (3,100 long tons) of coal, allowing her to steam for 5,500 nautical miles (10,200 km; 6,300 mi) at a speed of 10 knots (19 km/h; 12 mph). After 1915 the boilers were modified to burn oil, which would be sprayed on the coal to increase its burn rate; (Note: Because of the wartime situation, Germany had limited access to high quality coal, but was able to acquire lower-grade coal for its ships. The higher quality coal was generally reserved for the smaller craft, whose crews were less able to clean the boilers at the increased rate demanded by the low-quality coal. As a result, German capital ships were often supplied with poor coal, in the knowledge that their larger crews were better able to perform the increased maintenance. After 1915, the practice of spraying oil onto the low-quality coal was introduced, in order to increase the burn rate.) the ship could carry up to 197 metric tons (194 long tons).

Oldenburg was armed with a main battery of twelve 30.5 cm (12 in) SK L/50 (Note: In Imperial German Navy gun nomenclature, "SK" (Schnelladekanone) denotes that the gun is quick firing, while the L/50 denotes the length of the gun. In this case, the L/50 gun is 50 calibers, meaning that the gun is 50 times as long as its diameter.) guns in six twin gun turrets, with one turret fore, one aft, and two on each flank of the ship. The ship's secondary battery consisted of fourteen 15 cm (5.9 in) SK L/45 guns, all of which were mounted in casemates in the side of the upper deck. For defense against torpedo boats, she carried fourteen 8.8 cm (3.5 in) SK L/45 guns. After 1914, two of the 8.8 cm guns were removed and replaced by 8.8 cm anti-aircraft guns; later, an additional two 8.8 cm guns were replaced with anti-aircraft guns. This brought the total number of 8.8 cm SK L/45 guns to ten, and the number of 8.8 cm anti-aircraft guns to four. Oldenburg was also armed with six 50 cm (19.7 in) submerged torpedo tubes; one was in the bow, one in the stern, and two on each broadside.

Her main armored belt was 300 mm (11.8 in) thick in the central citadel, and was composed of Krupp cemented armor (KCA). Her main battery gun turrets were protected by the same thickness of KCA on the sides and faces, as well as the barbettes that supported the turrets. Oldenburg's deck was 63.5 mm (2.5 in) thick.

== Service history ==
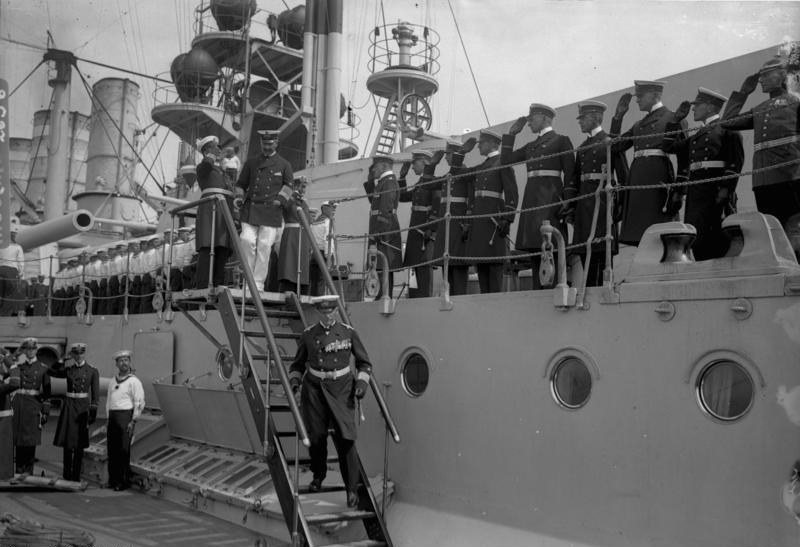
Kaiser Wilhelm II touring the ship circa 1912–1914

Oldenburg was ordered by the German Imperial Navy (Kaiserliche Marine) under the provisional name Ersatz Frithjof, (Note: German warships were ordered under provisional names. Additions to the fleet were given a single letter; ships intended to replace older or lost vessels were ordered as "Ersatz (name of the ship to be replaced)".) as a replacement for the old coastal defense ship Frithjof. The contract for the ship was awarded to the Schichau-Werke shipyard in Danzig under construction number 828. Her three sisters had been ordered for 1908, but because of budget constraints, Oldenburg's order was delayed to 1909. Admiral Alfred von Tirpitz, the State Secretary of the Navy, gave the contract to Schichau before the 1909 budget had been approved, and the shipbuilder began stockpiling materials to build the ship. This gave the impression that Germany was building more battleships than publicly admitted, which prompted a naval scare in Britain. The British public demanded "we want eight [new battleships] and we won't wait", and in the span of a year eight new battleships had been laid down in Britain, a major escalation in the international naval arms race.

Work began on Oldenburg on 1 March 1909 with the laying of her keel, and the ship was launched a little more than a year later on 30 June 1910. Duchess Sophia Charlotte of Oldenburg christened her, and Friedrich August, the Grand Duke of Oldenburg, gave the speech. After launching, the incomplete ship was transferred to Kiel for fitting out, including completion of the superstructure and the installation of armament, until August 1911. Named for the old ironclad Oldenburg, the ship was commissioned into the High Seas Fleet on 1 May 1912, just over three years after work commenced. Her first commander was Kapitän zur See (KzS—Captain at Sea) Hugo Langemak.

After her commissioning on 1 May 1912, Oldenburg conducted sea trials in the Baltic. On 17 July, she was assigned to I Battle Squadron of the High Seas Fleet, alongside her sisters. After individual ship training exercises, she joined I Squadron maneuvers and then fleet maneuvers in November. The annual summer cruise in July and August, which typically went to Norway, was interrupted by the Agadir Crisis. As a result, the cruise only went into the Baltic, in order to keep the fleet closer to Germany. Oldenburg and the rest of the fleet then fell into a pattern of individual ship, squadron, and full fleet exercises over the next two years of peace-time training. In September 1913, KzS Wilhelm Höpfner replaced Langemak as the ship's captain.

The annual summer cruise to Norway began on 14 July 1914, despite the rising international tensions following the assassination of Archduke Franz Ferdinand of Austria. (Note: The primary reason the cruise was not canceled was to give the appearance of normalcy in Germany. Chancellor Theobald von Bethmann Hollweg repeatedly denied requests by Admiral Friedrich von Ingenohl, the fleet commander, and Kaiser Wilhelm II to bring the fleet back to Germany early. The Kaiser eventually overrode Bethmann Hollweg after he learned of the July Ultimatum.) During the last peacetime cruise of the Imperial Navy, the fleet conducted drills in the Skagerrak before proceeding to the Norwegian fjords on 25 July. The following day the fleet began to steam back to Germany due to Austria-Hungary's ultimatum to Serbia. On 27 July, the entire fleet assembled off Cape Skudenes before returning to port, where they remained at a heightened state of readiness. War between Austria-Hungary and Serbia broke out on the 28th, and in the span of a week all of the major European powers had joined the conflict. By 29 July Oldenburg and the rest of I Squadron were back in Wilhelmshaven.

=== World War I ===
The High Seas Fleet's disposition on the morning of 16 December 1914, during the raid on Scarborough, Hartlepool and Whitby

Oldenburg was present during the first sortie by German fleet into the North Sea, which took place on 2–3 November 1914. No British forces were encountered during the operation. A second operation followed on 15–16 December. This sortie was the initiation of a strategy adopted by Admiral Friedrich von Ingenohl, the commander of the High Seas Fleet. Ingenohl intended to use the battlecruisers of Konteradmiral (KAdm—Rear Admiral) Franz von Hipper's I Scouting Group to raid British coastal towns in order to lure out portions of the Grand Fleet where they could be destroyed by the High Seas Fleet. Early on 15 December the fleet left port to raid the towns of Scarborough, Hartlepool, and Whitby. That evening, the German battle fleet of eight pre-dreadnoughts and twelve dreadnoughts, including Oldenburg and her three sisters, came to within 10 nmi (19 km; 12 mi) of an isolated squadron of six British battleships. Skirmishes between the rival destroyer screens in the darkness convinced Ingenohl that he was faced with the entire Grand Fleet, so Ingenohl broke off the engagement and turned the battle fleet back toward Germany, under orders from Kaiser Wilhelm II to avoid risking the fleet unnecessarily.

The Battle of Dogger Bank, in which Vice Admiral David Beatty's 1st and 2nd Battlecruiser Squadrons ambushed the I Scouting Group battlecruisers, occurred on 24 January 1915. Oldenburg and the rest of I Squadron were sortied to reinforce the outnumbered German battlecruisers; I Squadron left port at 12:33 CET, (Note: The Germans were on Central European Time, which is one hour ahead of UTC, the time zone commonly used in British works.) along with the pre-dreadnoughts of II Squadron. They were too late, however, and they failed to locate any British forces. By 19:05, the fleet had returned to the Schillig Roads outside Wilhelmshaven. In the meantime, the armored cruiser Blücher had been overwhelmed by concentrated British fire and sunk, while the battlecruiser Seydlitz was severely damaged by an ammunition fire. As a result, Kaiser Wilhelm II removed Ingenohl from his post and replaced him with Admiral Hugo von Pohl on 2 February.

From 22 February to 13 March 1915, I Squadron was in the Baltic for unit training. Following their return to the North Sea, the ships participated in a series of uneventful fleet sorties on 29–30 March, 17–18 April, 21–22 April, 17–18 May, and 29–30 May. The fleet was largely inactive until 4 August, when I Squadron returned to the Baltic for another round of training maneuvers. From there, the squadron was attached to the naval force that attempted to sweep the Gulf of Riga of Russian naval forces in August 1915. The assault force included the eight I Squadron battleships, the battlecruisers Von der Tann, Moltke, and Seydlitz, several light cruisers, 32 destroyers and 13 minesweepers. The plan called for channels in Russian minefields to be swept so that the Russian naval presence, which included the pre-dreadnought battleship Slava, could be eliminated. The Germans would then lay minefields of their own to prevent Russian ships from returning to the Gulf. Oldenburg and the majority of the other big ships of the High Seas Fleet remained outside the Gulf for the entirety of the operation, to prevent possible intervention by the Russian fleet outside the Gulf. The dreadnoughts Nassau and Posen were detached on 16 August to escort the minesweepers and to destroy Slava, though they failed to sink the old battleship. After three days, the Russian minefields had been cleared, and the flotilla entered the Gulf on 19 August, but reports of Allied submarines in the area prompted a German withdrawal from the Gulf the following day. By 26 August, I Squadron had returned to Wilhelmshaven.

On 23–24 October, the High Seas Fleet undertook its last major offensive operation under the command of Pohl, though it ended without contact with British forces. Weakened by hepatic cancer and unable to carry out his duties, he was replaced by Vizeadmiral Reinhard Scheer in January. Scheer proposed a more aggressive policy designed to force a confrontation with the British Grand Fleet; he received approval from the Kaiser in February. Scheer's first operation was a sweep into the North Sea on 5–7 March, followed by two more on 21–22 March and 25–26 March. During his next operation, Oldenburg supported a raid on the English coast on 24 April 1916 conducted by the German battlecruiser force. The battlecruisers left the Jade Estuary at 10:55 and the rest of the High Seas Fleet followed at 13:40. The battlecruiser Seydlitz struck a mine while en route to the target, and had to withdraw. The other battlecruisers bombarded the town of Lowestoft unopposed, but during the approach to Yarmouth, they encountered the British cruisers of the Harwich Force. A short gun duel ensued before the Harwich Force withdrew. Reports of British submarines in the area prompted the retreat of I Scouting Group. At this point, Scheer, who had been warned of the sortie of the Grand Fleet from its base in Scapa Flow, also withdrew to safer German waters.

==== Battle of Jutland ====
Maps showing the maneuvers of the British (blue) and German (red) fleets on 31 May – 1 June 1916

Oldenburg was present during the fleet operation that resulted in the battle of Jutland which took place on 31 May and 1 June 1916. The German fleet again sought to draw out and isolate a portion of the Grand Fleet and destroy it before the main British fleet could retaliate. During the operation, Oldenburg was the fourth ship in I Division of I Squadron and the twelfth ship in the line, directly astern of her sister ship Helgoland and ahead of Posen. At the center of the German line was I Squadron, behind the eight König- and Kaiser-class battleships of III Squadron. The six elderly pre-dreadnoughts of III and IV Divisions, II Battle Squadron, formed the rear of the formation.

Shortly before 16:00, the battlecruisers of I Scouting Group encountered the British 1st Battlecruiser Squadron under the command of David Beatty. The opposing ships began an artillery duel that saw the destruction of Indefatigable, shortly after 17:00, and Queen Mary, less than half an hour later. By this time, the German battlecruisers were steaming south to draw the British ships toward the main body of the High Seas Fleet. At 17:30, the crew of the leading German battleship, König, spotted both I Scouting Group and the 1st Battlecruiser Squadron approaching. The German battlecruisers were steaming to starboard, while the British ships steamed to port. At 17:45, Scheer ordered a two-point turn to port to bring his ships closer to the British battlecruisers, and a minute later, the order to open fire was given. (Note: The compass can be divided into 32 points, each corresponding to 11.25 degrees. A two-point turn to port would alter the ships' course by 22.5 degrees.)

At first, Oldenburg was too far away to effectively engage any British ships. Shortly before 18:30, the German line came across the British destroyers Nestor and Nomad, which had been disabled earlier in the engagement. Naval historian John Campbell states that "Thüringen and Helgoland, and possibly Oldenburg and Posen, fired turret guns", as well as secondary weapons, at Nestor. The ship was destroyed by several large explosions and sank at 18:35; most of her crew was rescued by German torpedo boats. Shortly after 19:15, the British dreadnought Warspite came into range; she was the first major warship Oldenburg could engage. She fired her 30.5 cm guns briefly during the 180-degree turn ordered by Scheer to disengage from the British fleet. Oldenburg claimed to have straddled Warspite once, though her gunners had difficulty discerning the British battleship in the growing haze.

At around 23:30, the German fleet reorganized into the night cruising formation. Oldenburg was now the fifth ship, stationed toward the front of the 24-ship line. At around 01:10, the German line encountered the six destroyers of the British 4th Destroyer Flotilla. Oldenburg fired on several of the destroyers at close range, including Fortune and Porpoise. Fortune scored a single hit on Oldenburg with her 4-inch guns. The shell struck a forward searchlight above the bridge and caused serious casualties. The officer responsible for directing the 8.8 cm guns was killed, along with three other officers on the bridge. The helmsman was incapacitated and Höpfner was wounded. Oldenburg was briefly steaming unsteered, and was in danger of ramming Posen and Helgoland until Captain Höpfner managed to reach the wheel and take control of the ship. Oldenburg and several other battleships then took Ardent under fire; the destroyer was reduced to a flaming wreck. In the darkness, Fortune and Ardent were sunk and the remaining four ships were scattered.

Despite the ferocity of the night fighting, the High Seas Fleet punched through the British destroyer forces and reached Horns Reef by 4:00 on 1 June. A few hours later, the fleet arrived in the Jade; Thüringen, Helgoland, Nassau, and Westfalen took up defensive positions in the outer roadstead and Kaiser, Kaiserin, Prinzregent Luitpold, and Kronprinz anchored just outside the entrance locks to Wilhelmshaven. Oldenburg and the other seven remaining dreadnoughts entered port, where those that were still in fighting condition restocked ammunition and fuel. In the course of the battle, Oldenburg fired fifty-three 30.5 cm, eighty-eight 15 cm, and thirty 8.8 cm shells. The hit from Fortune was the only damage the ship incurred from enemy action, though a misfire occurred in the Number 4 port-side 15 cm gun. In total, Oldenburg's crew suffered eight men killed and fourteen wounded.

==== Subsequent operations ====
After Jutland, Oldenburg was assigned to guard duties in the German Bight. The damage incurred at Jutland was quickly repaired in Wilhelmshaven from 30 June to 15 July. In June, KzS Heinrich Löhlein arrived to take command of the ship, but he left briefly while the ship was under repair, returning in July once the ship was ready for action. On 18 August, now-Admiral Scheer attempted a repeat of the 31 May operation. Moltke and Von der Tann, the two serviceable German battlecruisers, were supported by three dreadnoughts in a mission to bombard the coastal town of Sunderland in an attempt to draw out and destroy Beatty's battlecruisers. The rest of the fleet, including Oldenburg, would trail behind and provide cover. On the approach to the English coast during the action of 19 August 1916, Scheer turned north and aborted the bombardment after receiving a false report from a zeppelin about a British unit in the area. By 14:35, Scheer had been warned of the Grand Fleet's approach and so turned his forces around and retreated to German ports.

On 25–26 September, Oldenburg and the rest of I Squadron covered an advance conducted by the II Führer der Torpedoboote (Leader of Torpedo Boats) to the Terschelling Bank. Scheer conducted another fleet operation on 18–20 October in the direction of the Dogger Bank, though again they failed to find British surface forces. The operation led to a brief action on 19 October, during which a British submarine torpedoed the cruiser München. The failure of the operation (coupled with the action of 19 August) convinced the German naval command to abandon its aggressive fleet strategy in favor of a resumption of the unrestricted submarine warfare campaign.

For the majority of 1917, Oldenburg was assigned to guard duty in the German Bight. During Operation Albion, the amphibious assault on the Russian-held islands in the Gulf of Riga, Oldenburg and her three sisters were moved to the Danish Straits to block any possible British attempt to intervene. On 28 October the four ships arrived in Putzig Wiek, and from there steamed to Arensburg on 29 October. On 2 November the operation was completed and Oldenburg and her sisters began the voyage back to the North Sea. A final abortive fleet sortie took place on 23–24 April 1918. Scheer had intended to intercept a British convoy to Norway and destroy the escorting battleships. During the operation, the battlecruiser Moltke suffered mechanical problems and had to be towed back to port. Oldenburg took the ship in tow, and the main body of the fleet turned back to Germany while Hipper searched in vain for the convoy. German intelligence had incorrectly placed the date for the scheduled convoy on 24 April, and after several hours of fruitless steaming, Hipper turned for port as well. By 18:37, the fleet was outside the Jade and Moltke had been repaired enough to allow her to enter port under her own power. In June, KzS Eberhard Heydel arrived to relieve Löhlein as the ship's commander. He left the ship briefly in August but returned the following month.

=== Fate ===
Oldenburg and her three sisters were to have taken part in a final fleet action at the end of October 1918, days before the Armistice was to take effect. The bulk of the High Seas Fleet was to have sortied from their base in Wilhelmshaven to engage the British Grand Fleet. Scheer—by now the Grand Admiral (Großadmiral) of the fleet—intended to inflict as much damage as possible on the British navy to improve Germany's bargaining position, despite the expected casualties. But many of the war-weary sailors felt that the operation would disrupt the peace process and prolong the war. On the morning of 29 October 1918, the order was given to sail from Wilhelmshaven the following day. Starting on the night of 29 October, sailors on Thüringen and then on several other battleships mutinied. The unrest ultimately forced Hipper and Scheer to cancel the operation. Informed of the situation, the Kaiser stated "I no longer have a navy". In November, KzS Hermann Bauer became Oldenburg's final commander.

Following the German collapse that had resulted in the Armistice of 11 November 1918, a significant portion of the High Seas Fleet was interned in Scapa Flow. Oldenburg and her three sisters were not among the ships listed for internment, so they remained at German ports. Under the terms of the Treaty of Versailles that formally ended the war in June 1919, Oldenburg and the other dreadnoughts that had remained in Germany were to be surrendered to the Allies under Article 185 as prizes of war. Negotiations between the Allies over which country received what vessels, and what those ships could be used for began in November. Oldenburg was struck from the German naval list on 5 November. While final decisions were still being made, the Allies decided that the ships in question were to sail to either a British or French port, and accordingly, on 8 May 1920, Oldenburg, Posen, and the torpedo boat V71 sailed for Rosyth, Britain, arriving on 12 May. Oldenburg, which had been renamed "M", was surrendered to Japan as a "propaganda" vessel, which could be used in weapons tests or other experiments. The Japanese Navy had no need for the ship; she was sold to a British ship-breaking firm in June 1920, re-sold to a Dutch firm, and broken up for scrap the following year in Dordrecht.
