= Odenberg =

Odenberg is a Swedish surname. Notable people with the surname include:

- Christina Odenberg (born 1940), Swedish bishop
- Mikael Odenberg (born 1953), Swedish politician

== See also ==
- Oldenberg
