= Mount Semprebon =

Mountain in Antarctica

Highest point
- Coordinates: 82°4′S 88°1′W

Geography
- Location: Martin Hills

Mount Semprebon (82°4′S 88°1′W) is a prominent, partly snow-free peak rising 1 nautical mile (1.9 km) northeast of Mount Barsoum in Martin Hills. The peak was positioned by the U.S. Ellworth-Byrd Traverse Party on December 10, 1958, and named for Louis C. Semprebon, an ionospheric physicist and assistant scientific leader at Ellsworth Station in 1958.
