= Helgoland-class battleship =

Battleship class of the German Imperial Navy

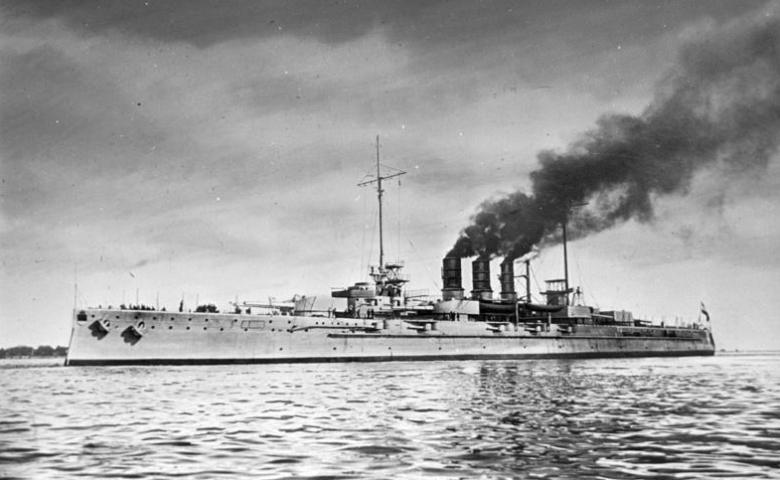
- SMS Helgoland c. 1911–1917

Class overview
- Name: Helgoland class
- Builders: AG Weser (1); Howaldtswerke (1); Kaiserliche Werft Wilhelmshaven (1); Schichau-Werke (1)
- Operators: Imperial German Navy
- Preceded by: Nassau class
- Succeeded by: Kaiser class
- Built: 1908–1912
- In commission: 1911–1920
- Completed: 4
- Lost: 1
- Scrapped: 3

General characteristics
- Type: Dreadnought battleship
- Displacement: Normal: 22,808 t (22,448 long tons); Full load: 24,700 t (24,300 long tons)
- Length: 167.20 m (548 ft 7 in)
- Beam: 28.50 m (93 ft 6 in)
- Draft: 8.94 m (29 ft 4 in)
- Installed power: 15 × water-tube boilers; 28,000 PS (28,000 ihp)
- Propulsion: 3 × triple-expansion steam engines; 3 × screw propellers
- Speed: 20.5 knots (38.0 km/h; 23.6 mph)
- Range: 5,500 nmi (10,200 km; 6,300 mi) at 10 knots (19 km/h; 12 mph)
- Crew: 42 officers; 1071 enlisted men
- Armament: 12 × 30.5 cm (12 in) guns; 14 × 15 cm (5.9 in) guns; 14 × 8.8 cm (3.5 in) guns; 6 × 50 cm (20 in) torpedo tubes
- Armor: Belt: 300 mm (11.8 in); Decks: 63 mm (2.5 in); Barbettes: 300 mm; Turrets: 300 mm

The Helgoland class was the second class of dreadnought battleships to be built for the German Kaiserliche Marine (Imperial Navy). Constructed from 1908 to 1912, the class comprised four ships: Helgoland, the lead ship, Ostfriesland, Thüringen, and Oldenburg. The design was a significant improvement over the previous Nassau-class ships; they had a larger main battery—30.5 cm (12 in) main guns instead of the 28 cm (11 in) weapons mounted on the earlier vessels—and an improved propulsion system. The Helgolands were easily distinguished from the preceding Nassaus by the three funnels that were closely arranged, compared to the two larger funnels of the previous class. The ships retained the hexagonal main battery layout of the Nassau class.

The ships served as a unit in I Division, I Battle Squadron alongside the Nassau-class ships in II Division of the squadron. They saw combat during World War I, including the Battle of Jutland in the North Sea and the Battle of the Gulf of Riga in the Baltic. All four survived the war, but were not taken as part of the German fleet that was interned at Scapa Flow. When the German ships at Scapa Flow were scuttled, the four Helgolands were ceded as war reparations to the victorious Allied powers in the sunken ships' stead. Ostfriesland was taken by the US Navy and expended as a target during Billy Mitchell's air power demonstration in July 1921. Helgoland and Oldenburg were allotted to Britain and Japan respectively, and broken up in 1921. Thüringen was delivered to France in 1920, and was used as a target ship for the French navy. The ship was eventually broken up between 1923 and 1933.

== Design ==
The Triple Entente between the United Kingdom, France, and Russia had been signed in 1907. Germany had become significantly isolated—on the Continent, Germany was hemmed in by France in the west and Russia in the east, and the UK, with her powerful navy, was capable of blocking German access to the world shipping lanes. Admiral Alfred von Tirpitz reacted to this development with the request for newer and stronger capital ships. His thoughts on the matter were, "The aim which I had to keep in view ... for technical and organizing reasons as well as reasons of political finance was to build as steadily as possible." His appeal came in the form of the proposed Second Amendment to the Naval Law, which was passed on 27 March 1908.

For the second class of German dreadnoughts, there was considerable debate as to what changes would be made from the first design. In May 1906, the Reichsmarineamt (RMA, Imperial Navy Office) received word that the British were building battleships equipped with 13.5-inch (34 cm) guns. As a result, the General Navy Department advocated increasing the caliber of the main battery from 28 cm (11 in) to 30.5 cm (12 in). Tirpitz was reluctant to agree to this change, as he wished to avoid escalating the arms race with Britain.

Tirpitz's hesitation at increasing the armament of the new ships was lost when it became known in early 1907 that the United States Navy was building battleships with 30.5 cm guns. In March 1907, Tirpitz ordered the Construction Department to prepare a design with 30.5 cm guns and 320 mm (13 in) thick belt armor. Some dispute remained over the arrangement of the main battery. The two Minas Geraes-class battleships being built for Brazil mounted the same number of guns, but in a more efficient arrangement. Superfiring turret pairs were placed on either end of the ship, with two wing turrets amidships. Tirpitz favored adopting this arrangement for the Helgoland class, but the Construction Department felt two superfiring turrets could be easily disabled by a single hit. As a result, the hexagonal arrangement of the preceding Nassaus was retained.

The Naval Law stipulated that the lifespan of large warships was to be reduced from 25 years to 20 years; this was done in an effort to force the Reichstag to allocate funds for additional ships. The reduction necessitated the replacement of the coastal defense ships of the Siegfried and Oldenburg classes as well as the Brandenburg-class battleships. The battleships that Tirpitz had failed to secure in the First Amendment to the Naval Law of 1906 were now approved by the Reichstag. The Naval Law also increased the naval budget by an additional 1 billion marks. After the four Sachsen-class ironclads had been replaced by the four Nassaus, three of the Siegfried-class ships—Siegfried, Beowulf, Frithjof—and the unique coastal defense ship Oldenburg were the next slated to be replaced. The Helgoland-class ships—SMS Helgoland, Ostfriesland, Thüringen, Oldenburg—were ordered under the provisional names Ersatz Siegfried, Ersatz Oldenburg, Ersatz Beowulf, and Ersatz Frithjof, respectively. (Note: All German ships were ordered under provisional names; new additions to the fleet were given a letter, while ships that were intended to replace older vessels were ordered as "Ersatz (ship name)." An excellent example of this practice is the Derfflinger-class battlecruisers: the lead ship SMS Derfflinger was considered a new addition to the fleet, and was ordered as "K", while her sisters Lützow and Hindenburg were ordered as Ersatz Kaiserin Augusta and Ersatz Hertha, as replacements for two older ships.)

=== General characteristics ===
Plan and profile drawing of the Helgoland class

The Helgoland-class ships were longer than their predecessors, at 167.2 m (548 ft 7 in) overall. The ships had a beam of 28.5 m (93 ft 6 in) and at full load a draft of 8.94 m (29 ft 4 in). The ships were significantly heavier than the Nassau class; the Helgoland-class ships displaced 22,808 metric tons (22,448 long tons) at a standard load, and 24,700 t (24,310 long tons) at full load, nearly 4,000 t (3,900 long tons) more than the earlier ships. (Note: The Nassau-class battleships displaced 18,570 tons at the designed weight, and 21,000 tons at a full load.) The ships had 17 watertight compartments and a double bottom for 86% of the length of the hull.

The class had greatly improved handling characteristics over the preceding Nassau class. The Helgolands were much better sea boats and did not suffer from the severe rolling that the Nassaus did. The ships were responsive to the helm, and had a tight turning radius, and lost only minimal speed during swells. The ships lost up to 54% of their speed at hard rudder, and would heel up to 7°. For comparison, the earlier Nassaus lost up to 70% speed and held a 12° heel with the rudder hard over.

=== Propulsion ===
The Helgoland-class ships retained older triple-expansion steam engines rather than the new steam turbines in use in the British Royal Navy. This decision was based solely on cost: at the time, Parsons held a monopoly on steam turbines and required a 1 million gold mark royalty fee for every turbine engine. The triple-expansion engines were three-shaft, four-cylinder engines arranged in three engine rooms. Each shaft drove a four-bladed screw propeller that was 5.1 m (16 ft 9 in) in diameter. The engines were powered by 15 marine-type boilers with two fireboxes apiece for a total of 30. The engines were rated at 27,617 ihp (20,594 kW) with a top speed of 20.5 knots (38.0 km/h; 23.6 mph). On trials, the power-plant produced up to 35,014 ihp (26,110 kW), and a top speed of 21.3 knots (39.4 km/h; 24.5 mph). The ships carried 3,200 tonnes (3,150 long tons) of coal, and were later modified to carry an additional 197 tonnes (194 long tons) of oil that was to be sprayed on the coal to increase its burn rate. (Note: Because of the wartime situation, Germany had limited access to high quality coal, but was able to acquire lower-grade coal for its ships. The higher quality coal was generally reserved for the smaller craft, whose crews were less able to clean the boilers at the increased rate demanded by the low-quality coal. As a result, German capital ships were often supplied with poor coal, in the knowledge that their larger crews were better able to perform the increased maintenance. After 1915, the practice of spraying oil onto the low-quality coal was introduced, in order to increase the burn rate.) At full fuel capacity, the ships could steam for 5,500 nautical miles (10,200 km; 6,300 mi) at a speed of 10 knots (19 km/h; 12 mph). The ships' electrical power was provided by eight turbo-generators that produced 2,000 kW (225 V).

=== Armament ===
Helgoland's bridge and forward main battery turrets

Like the preceding Nassau class (pictured), the Helogolands used an unusual hexagonal arrangement for their main battery

Like the Nassau class which preceded it, the Helgoland-class ships carried their main armament in an unusual hexagonal configuration. Twelve 30.5 cm SK L/50 (Note: In Imperial German Navy gun nomenclature, "SK" (Schnelladekanone) denotes that the gun is quick firing, while the L/50 denotes the length of the gun. In this case, the L/50 gun is 50 caliber, meaning that the gun is 50 times as long as it is in diameter.) guns were emplaced in long-trunk C/1908 mountings, an improved version of the previous C/1907 and C/1906 mounts used in the Nassau class. The guns were arranged in pairs in six twin gun turrets, with one turret each fore and aft, and two on each flank of the ship. The guns could initially be depressed to −8° and elevated to 13.5°, although after the Battle of Dogger Bank in January 1915, where British ships had been able to open fire first, outside the range of the German guns, the turrets were modified to allow −5.5° depression and 16° of elevation, extending the range from 18,700 m (20,500 yd) to 20,500 m (22,400 yd). The guns fired 405-kilogram (893 lb) projectiles at a muzzle velocity of 855 m/s (2,810 ft/s). The guns had a total of 1,020 rounds for 85 shells per gun.

The ships' secondary armament consisted of fourteen 15 cm (5.9 in) SK L/45 guns, which were mounted in casemates. The guns fired 45.3-kilogram (100 lb) shells at a muzzle velocity of 840 m/s (2,800 ft/s). The guns could be elevated to 19°, which provided a maximum range of 14,950 metres (16,350 yd). The ships also carried fourteen 8.8 cm (3.5 in) SK L/45 guns, also in casemates. These guns fired a 10-kilogram (22 lb) projectile at 650 m/s (2,100 ft/s), and could be trained up to 25° for a maximum range of 9,600 m (10,500 yd). After 1914, two 8.8 cm guns were removed and replaced by two 8.8 cm Flak guns, and between 1916 and 1917, the remaining twelve 8.8 cm casemated guns were removed. These anti-aircraft guns fired a slightly lighter 9.6-kilogram (21 lb) shell at 770 m/s (2,500 ft/s). They could be elevated to 45° and could hit targets 11,800 m (12,900 yd) away. The Helgoland-class ships were further armed with six 50 cm (20 in) submerged torpedo tubes. One tube was mounted in the bow, another in the stern, and two on each broadside, on either ends of the torpedo bulkhead.

=== Armor ===
The Helgoland-class ships were protected with Krupp cemented armor, in almost the same layout as in the preceding Nassau-class ships. The only major differences were slight increases in the armor protection for the main and secondary batteries, and a much thicker roof for the forward conning tower. The ships had an armored belt that was 30 cm (12 in) thick at its strongest points, where it protected the ship's vitals, and as thin as 8 cm (3.1 in) in less critical areas, such as the bow and stern. Behind the main belt was a torpedo bulkhead 3 cm (1.2 in) thick. The ships' decks were armored, between 5.5 and 8 cm (2.2 and 3.1 in) thick. The forward conning tower on each vessel had a roof that was 20 cm (7.9 in) thick, and sides 40 cm (16 in) thick. The aft conning tower was not as heavily armored, with only a 5 cm (2 in) thick roof and 20 cm (7.9 in) sides. The main battery turrets had roofs that were 10 cm (3.9 in) thick, and 30 cm sides. The casemated secondary battery had 17 cm (6.7 in) worth of armor protection, and 8 cm thick gun shields. The Helgolands were also fitted with anti-torpedo nets, but these were removed after 1916.

== Construction ==
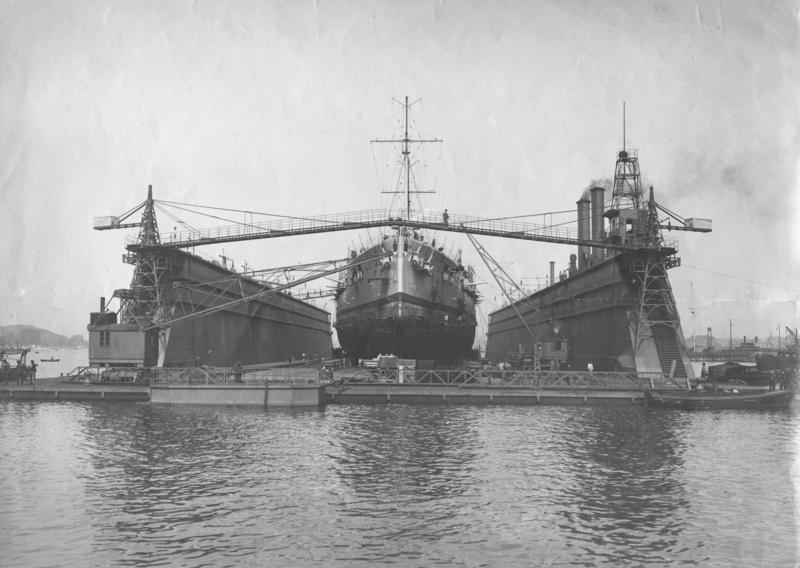
Helgoland in a floating dry dock

Four ships of the class were ordered, under the provisional names Ersatz Siegfried (Helgoland), Ersatz Oldenburg (Ostfriesland), Ersatz Beowulf (Thüringen), and Ersatz Frithjof (Oldenburg), as replacements for three of the coastal defense ships of the Siegfried-class, and the unique coastal defense ship SMS Oldenburg. SMS Helgoland was built at Howaldtswerke, Kiel. She was laid down on 11 November 1908, launched 25 September 1909, and commissioned nearly two years later on 23 August 1911. SMS Ostfriesland was built at Kaiserliche Werft Wilhelmshaven. She was laid down 19 October 1908, launched five days after her sister Helgoland, on 30 September 1909, and commissioned 1 August 1911. SMS Thüringen was built by AG Weser in Bremen. She was laid down on 2 November 1908, launched on 27 November 1909, and commissioned on 1 July 1911. SMS Oldenburg, the final vessel, was built by Schichau in Danzig; she was laid down 1 March 1909, launched 30 June 1910, and commissioned on 1 May 1912.

=== Ships ===
Construction data
Ship	Contract name	Builder	Namesake	Laid down	Launched	Commissioned	Fate
Helgoland	Ersatz Siegfried	Howaldtswerke Werft, Kiel	Heligoland	11 November 1908	25 September 1909	23 August 1911	Broken up at Morecambe, 1921
Ostfriesland	Ersatz Oldenburg	Kaiserliche Werft, Wilhelmshaven	East Frisia	19 October 1908	30 September 1909	1 August 1911	Sunk as target off Cape Hatteras, 21 July 1921
Thüringen	Ersatz Beowulf	AG Weser, Bremen	Thuringia	2 November 1908	27 November 1909	1 July 1911	Sunk as target off Gâvres, August 1921
Oldenburg	Ersatz Frithjof	Schichau-Werke, Danzig	Duchy of Oldenburg	1 March 1909	30 June 1910	1 May 1912	Broken up at Dordrecht, 1921

== History ==
The Helgoland-class ships operated as a unit in the High Seas Fleet; they served as I Division of I Battle Squadron. The ships of the class participated in several fleet operations in the North Sea, including the sortie on 31 May 1916 that resulted in the Battle of Jutland. The ships also saw limited service in the Baltic Sea, primarily during the abortive Battle of the Gulf of Riga in August 1915.

=== Raid on Scarborough, Hartlepool and Whitby ===
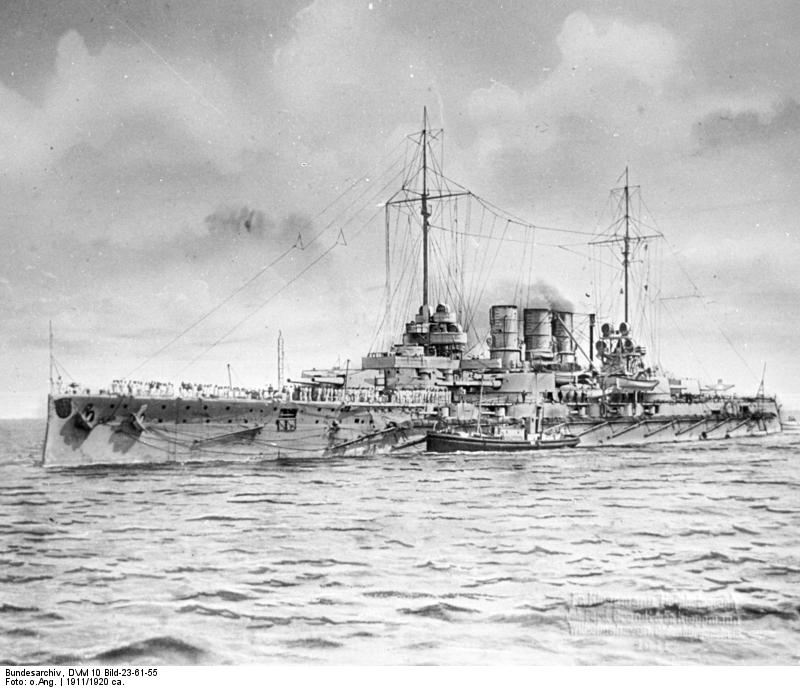
Ostfriesland in 1911

The first major operation of the war in which the Helgoland-class ships participated was the raid on Scarborough, Hartlepool and Whitby on 15–16 December 1914. The raid was primarily conducted by the battlecruisers of the I Scouting Group. The Helgoland-class ships, along with the Nassau, Kaiser, and König classes steamed in distant support of Franz von Hipper's battlecruisers. Friedrich von Ingenohl, the commander of the High Seas Fleet, decided to take up station approximately in the center of the North Sea, about 130 miles east of Scarborough.

The Royal Navy, which had recently received the German code books captured from the beached cruiser Magdeburg, was aware that an operation was taking place, but was not sure where the Germans would strike. Therefore, the Admiralty ordered David Beatty's 1st Battlecruiser Squadron, the six battleships of the 2nd Battle Squadron, and several cruisers and destroyers to intercept the German battlecruisers. However, Beatty's task force nearly ran headlong into the entire High Seas Fleet. At 6:20, Beatty's destroyer screen came into contact with the German torpedo boat V155. This began a confused, 2-hour long battle between the British destroyers and the German cruiser and destroyer screen, often at very close range. At the time of the first encounter, the Helgoland-class battleships were less than 10 nmi (19 km; 12 mi) away from the six British dreadnoughts; this was well within firing range, but in the darkness, neither British nor German admirals were aware of the composition of their opponents' fleets. Admiral Ingenohl, loath to disobey the Kaiser's order to not risk the battlefleet without his express approval, concluded that his forces were engaging the screen of the entire Grand Fleet, and so, 10 minutes after the first contact, he ordered a turn to port to a southeast course. Continued attacks delayed the turn, but by 6:42, it had been carried out. For about 40 minutes, the two fleets were steaming on a parallel course. At 7:20, Ingenohl ordered a further turn to port, which put his ships on a course for German waters.

Many in the German navy were furious over Ingenohl's timidity, and his reputation suffered greatly. Tirpitz remarked that "On 16 December, Ingenohl had the fate of Germany in the palm of his hand. I boil with inward emotion whenever I think of it." The captain of the battlecruiser Moltke was even more scathing; he stated that Ingenohl had turned away "because he was afraid of eleven British destroyers which could have been easily eliminated ... Under the present leadership we will accomplish nothing."

The Helgoland-class ships also sortied from port to support the German battlecruisers during the Battle of Dogger Bank, but did not actively engage British forces.

=== Battle of the Gulf of Riga ===
On 3 August 1915, several heavy units of the High Seas Fleet were transferred to the Baltic to participate in a planned foray into the Riga Gulf. The intention was to destroy the Russian naval forces in the area, including the pre-dreadnought Slava, and to use the minelayer Deutschland to block the entrance to Moon Sound with naval mines. The German forces, under the command of Vice Admiral Hipper, included the four Nassau and four Helgoland-class battleships, the battlecruisers Seydlitz, Moltke, and Von der Tann, and a number of smaller craft. The four Helgolands were not committed to the actual battle, however. For the duration of the operation, the ships were stationed outside the gulf in order to prevent Russian reinforcements from disrupting the laying of minefields.

The Russians' own minefields were larger than had been expected, and so clearing them took longer than the Germans had planned. This delay was compounded by stiff resistance from the Russian navy; Deutschland was ultimately unable to lay her mines. Reports of Allied submarine activity in the area prompted the withdrawal of the German naval force on the morning of 20 August. Indeed, the battlecruiser Moltke had been torpedoed by the British submarine HMS E1 the day before, though only minor damage was sustained.

=== Battle of Jutland ===
The ships took part in the inconclusive Battle of Jutland on 31 May – 1 June 1916. For the majority of the battle, I Battle Squadron formed the center of the line of battle, behind Rear Admiral Behncke's III Battle Squadron, and followed by Rear Admiral Mauve's elderly pre-dreadnoughts of II Battle Squadron. Ostfriesland served as the division flagship, under the command of Vice Admiral E. Schmidt.

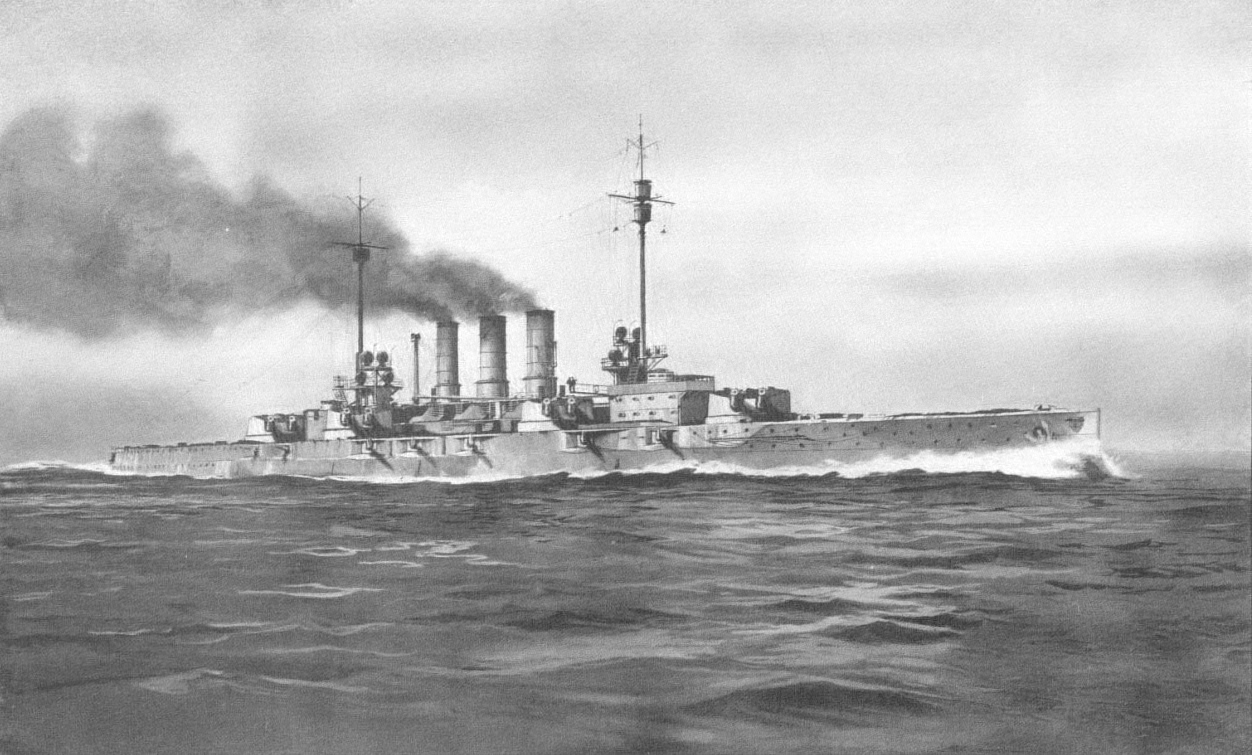
A recognition drawing prepared by the Royal Navy, with Helgoland's main battery turned to starboard

The Helgoland-class ships first entered direct combat at 19:20 on the first day of the battle. Ostfriesland, Helgoland, and Thüringen began firing on HMS Warspite, which, along with the other Queen Elizabeth-class battleships of the 5th Battle squadron, had been pursuing the German battlecruiser force. With the exception of Ostfriesland, the firing only lasted for four minutes, because the German line had been in the process of turning to the east-northeast, and the ships quickly lost sight of the British battleships. Thüringen and Helgoland only fired around 20 main battery shells before they lost sight of their target. Ostfriesland, however, was able to keep visual contact until 19:45, at which point she, too, ceased firing. At 20:15, during the third Gefechtskehrtwendung, (Note: This translates roughly as the "battle about-turn", and was a simultaneous 16-point turn of the entire High Seas Fleet. It had never been conducted under enemy fire before the Battle of Jutland.) Helgoland was struck by a 15 in (38 cm) shell in the forward part of the ship. The shell tore a 20-foot (6.1 m) hole in the hull and rained splinters on the foremost port side 5.9 in gun; approximately 80 tons of water entered the ship.

At around midnight on 1 June, the Helgoland- and Nassau-class ships in the center of the German line came into contact with the British 4th Destroyer Flotilla. A chaotic night battle ensued, during which Nassau rammed the British destroyer Spitfire. The 4th Flotilla broke off the action temporarily to regroup, but at around 01:00, unwittingly stumbled into the German dreadnoughts a second time. Oldenburg and Helgoland opened fire on the two leading British destroyers, but a British shell destroyed Oldenburg's forward search light. Shell fragments rained down on the bridge and wounded the ship's captain, Kapitän Hopfner, and killed his second in command, Kapitänleutnant Rabius, along with a number of other men on the bridge, including the helmsman. Oldenburg was temporarily without anyone to steer the ship; she was in danger of ramming either the ship to her rear or to her front. Hopfner, despite his injuries, took the helm and brought the ship back into line.

Shortly after 01:00, Thüringen and Nassau encountered the British armored cruiser Black Prince. Thüringen opened fire first and pummeled Black Prince with a total of 27 heavy-caliber shells and 24 rounds from her secondary battery. Nassau and Ostfriesland joined in, followed by Friedrich der Grosse.

[Black Prince] presented a terrible and awe-inspiring spectacle as she drifted down the line blazing furiously until, after several minor detonations, she disappeared below the surface with the whole of her crew in one tremendous explosion.

By this time, the 4th Destroyer Flotilla had been largely destroyed as a fighting unit. The few remaining, heavily damaged ships had been scattered and would take no further part in the battle.

Following the return to German waters, Helgoland and Thüringen, along with the Nassau-class battleships Nassau, Posen, and Westfalen, took up defensive positions in the Jade roadstead for the night. During the battle, the ships suffered only minor damage. Helgoland was hit by a single 15 in shell, but sustained minimal damage. Oldenburg was hit by a shell from a secondary battery that killed 8 and wounded 14 men. Ostfriesland and Thüringen escaped the battle unscathed, although on the return to German waters, Ostfriesland struck a mine and had to be repaired in Wilhelmshaven.

=== Post-war ===
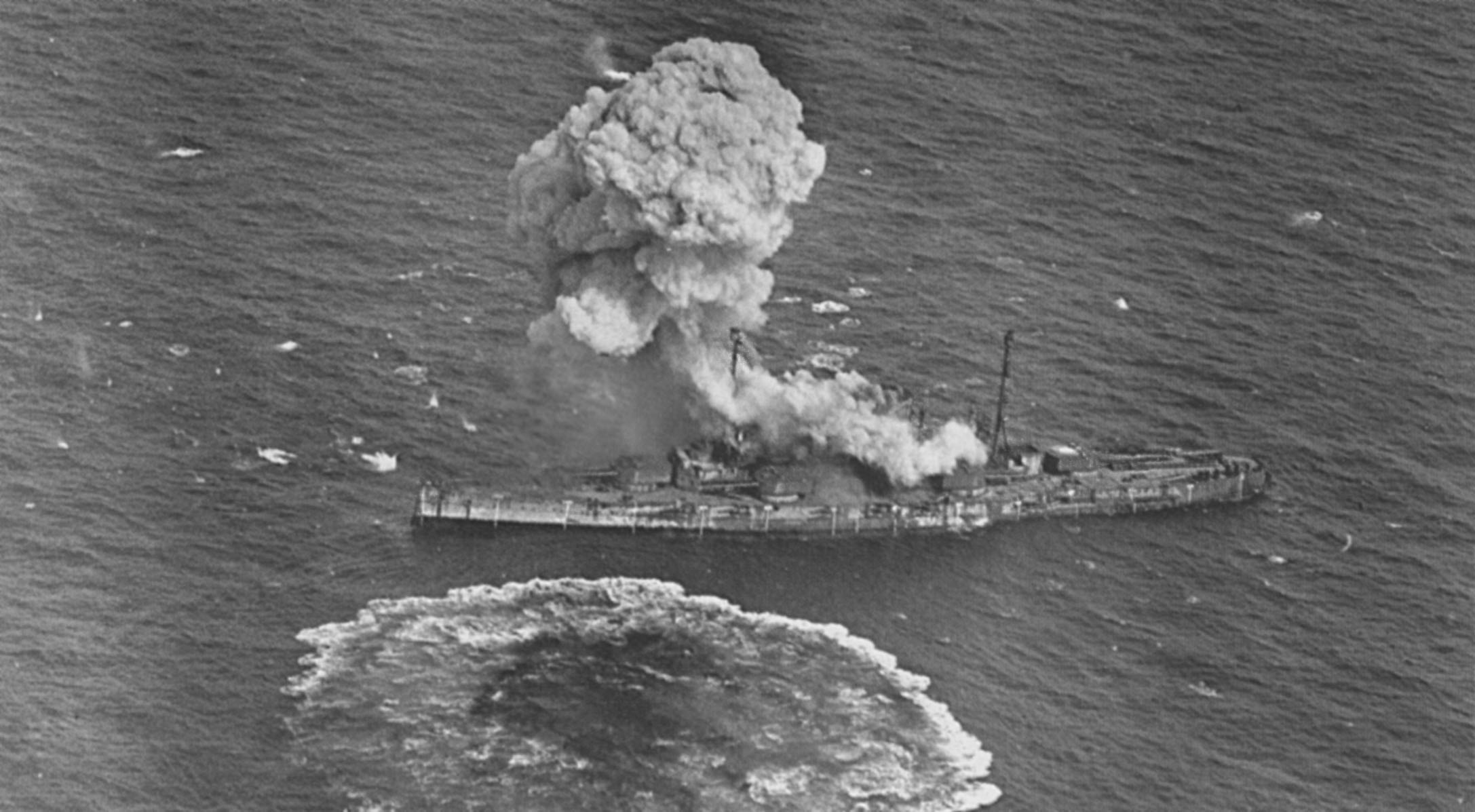
Ostfriesland burns after sustaining hits during bombing tests in July 1921

The ships of the class saw no further significant action during the war, and were ceded to the Allies under the terms of the Treaty of Versailles. All four ships were stricken from the German navy on 5 November 1919. Helgoland was taken by the British and was scrapped in 1921 in Morecambe. Her bow ornament was retained and was eventually returned to Germany; it is now on display in the Dresden army museum. Oldenburg was surrendered to the Japanese, but they did not take possession of the ship. Instead, they sold the vessel to a British salvage firm that scrapped it in Dordrecht in 1921. Thüringen was taken by France; the ship was nearly scuttled by her crew while en route to Cherbourg in 1920. She was used as a target until she was beached in 1923 at Gâvres. She was broken up in situ, but a large portion of the hull remains off shore.

Ostfriesland was ceded to the US Navy, and was later used as a stationary target during a demonstration of air power, conducted by General Billy Mitchell on 21 July 1921 off Cape Henry in Virginia. The ship sank at 12:40 after sustaining several bomb hits and near misses. However, she likely would have avoided these had she been underway, and if she had been hit, damage control teams would have kept the ship afloat.
