= Oldenburg (surname) =

Oldenburg is a surname. Notable people with the surname include:

- Claes Oldenburg (1929–2022), Swedish-American sculptor
- Henry Oldenburg (c. 1619–1677), German diplomat and the first Secretary of the Royal Society
- Jen Flynn Oldenburg (born 1978), American volleyball player and coach
- Ray Oldenburg (1932–2022), American urban sociologist
- Sergei Oldenburg (1863–1934), Russian ethnographer and politician
- Wilbrand van Oldenburg (before 1180–1233), a bishop of Paderborn and of Utrecht

== See also ==
- Oldenberg
