= Mount Oldenburg =

Mountain in Ellsworth Land, Antarctica

Mount Oldenburg (82°4′S 87°55′W) is a partly snow-covered peak 0.5 nautical miles (0.9 km) east of Mount Helms in the east part of Martin Hills. The peak was sketched by J. Campbell Craddock in January 1963. It was named by the Advisory Committee on Antarctic Names (US-ACAN) for Margaret Oldenburg, who has been interested in polar exploration and research for a number of years, and who is well known to polar workers because of her gifts of books, photographs and other materials to isolated IGY and Weather Bureau stations. Application of the name was suggested by a number of persons including Edward C. Thiel who, with J. Campbell Craddock, conducted an airlifted geophysical traverse along the 88th meridian near this feature in 1959–60.

== See also ==
- Mountains in Antarctica
