= Mount Barsoum =

Snow peak in Antarctica

Mount Barsoum (82°4′S 88°7′W) is a pointed and partly snow-free peak on the west end of Martin Hills. It was positioned by the U.S. Ellsworth-Byrd Traverse Party on December 10, 1958, and was named for Lieutenant Adib H. Barsoum, U.S. Navy, Medical Officer at Ellsworth Station in 1958.

== See also ==
- Mountains in Antarctica
