= Barsoum elements =

Barsoum elements is a finite element analysis technique used in fracture analysis to determine the stress intensity factor of a crack. It was introduced by R. Barsoum in 1976.

== Technique ==
In this method, the usual isoparametric 6 node triangular or 8 node isoparametric quadrilateral elements are employed. The mid side nodes on 2 adjacent sides are shifted towards the corner node to the quarter point location. For these locations of the mid nodes, the Jacobian becomes singular at the corner node thus making displacement derivatives infinite and stresses and strains become infinite as well. It can be shown that the variation of stresses along the 2 sides of the elements is according to 1/√r.

On the other hand, if all the three nodes on the side of an 8 node quadrilateral element are collapsed to one node (given the same node number) then the stress or strain varies as 1/√r along any radial line emanating from crack tip. All the mid side nodes adjacent to the crack tip are at quarter point locations. From the displacement field solution the stress intensity factor K_{1} in a mode 1 case can be calculated as per the following relation:

$K_1 = \frac{2\mu\sqrt{2\pi}(4V_B-V_C)}{(k+1)\sqrt{L}}$

where V_{B} and V_{C} are the displacement in the y direction behind the crack tip.

It has been demonstrated that K_{1} found by this method is within 2% of theoretical solutions. Accuracy of finite element calculation can be improved if the neighboring elements are also modeled to have the terms depicting the stresses for a crack with its tip outside the element.
