= Oldenberg =

Oldenberg is a German surname. Notable people with the surname include:

- Claes Oldenberg (1929–2022), American sculptor
- Henry Oldenburg (c. 1619–1677) German theologian, diplomat, natural philosopher, First Secretary of the Royal Society.
- Hermann Oldenberg (1854–1920), German scholar of Indology (the study of the Indian subcontinent)
- Lorenz Oldenberg (1863–1931), German entomologist

== Other uses ==
- Oldenberg Brewery, a defunct brewery and pub in Fort Mitchell, Kentucky, part of a Greater Cincinnati tourist expansion.

== See also ==
- Oldenburg (disambiguation)
