= 30.5 cm SK L/50 gun =

30.5 cm SK L/50
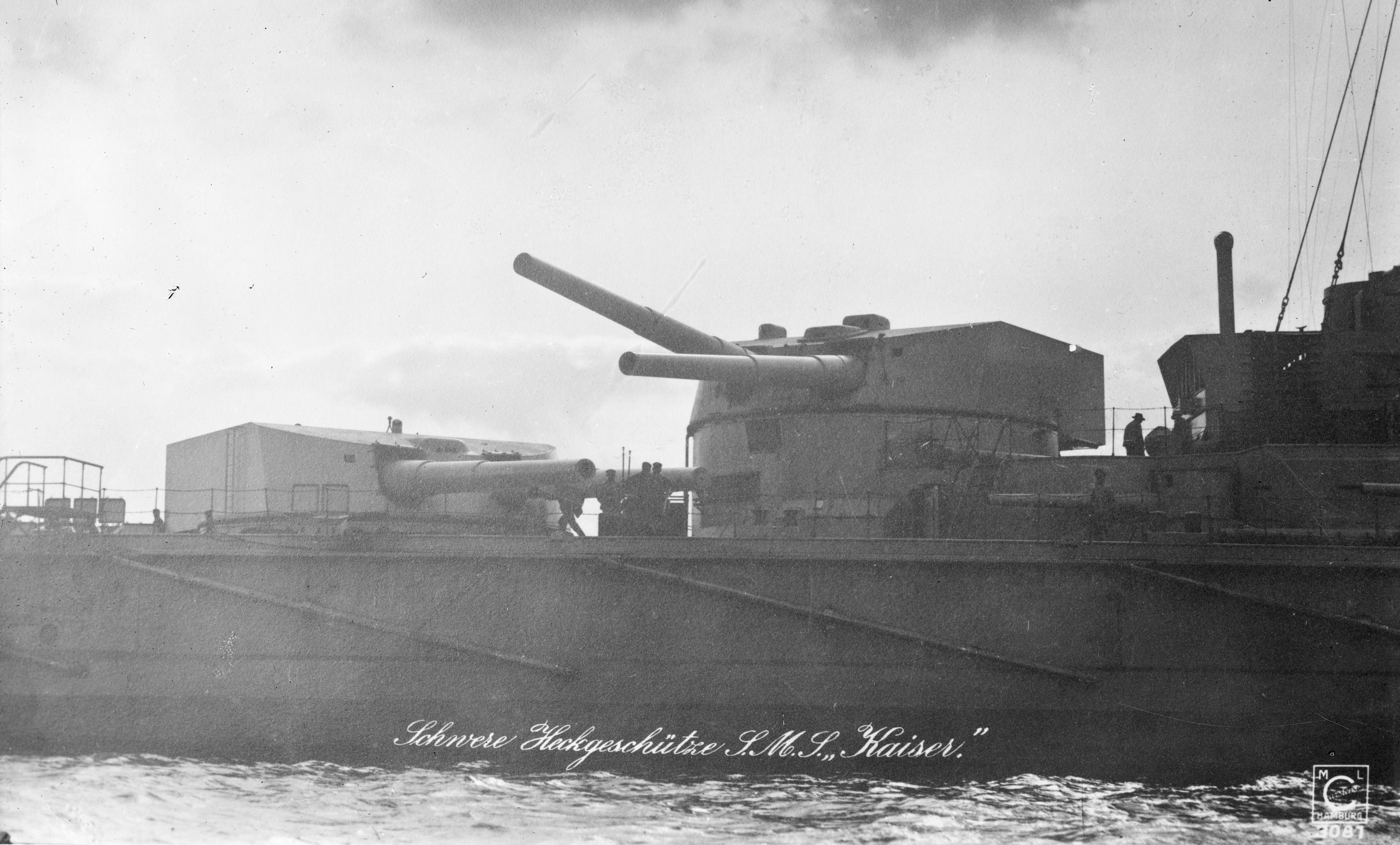
- Close-up of SMS Kaiser's aft turrets
- Type: Naval gun Coast-defence gun
- Place of origin: German Empire

Service history
- In service: 1911–45
- Used by: Kaiserliche Marine; Kriegsmarine
- Wars: World War I World War II

Production history
- Designed: 1908
- Manufacturer: Krupp

Specifications
- Mass: 51.85 tonnes (51.03 long tons; 57.15 short tons)
- Length: 15.25 metres (50 ft)
- Barrel length: 14.481 metres (47 ft 6 in) (50 calibers)
- Shell: 250–415 kg (551–915 lb)
- Caliber: 30.5 centimetres (12 in)
- Breech: horizontal sliding-block
- Recoil: Hydro-pneumatic
- Elevation: −8° to +13.5° (naval turrets)
- Traverse: depends on the mount
- Rate of fire: 2–3 rounds per minute
- Muzzle velocity: 855–1,120 m/s (2,810–3,670 ft/s)
- Effective firing range: 16,200 m (17,700 yd) at 13.5° elevation 41,300 m (45,200 yd) at 49.2° elevation

The 30.5 cm SK L/50 gun (Note: In Imperial German Navy gun nomenclature, "SK" (German: Schnelladekanone) denotes that the gun is quick firing, while the L/50 denotes the length of the gun. In this case, the L/50 gun is 50 calibers, meaning that the barrel is 50 times as long as it is in diameter.) was a heavy German gun mounted on 16 of the 26 German capital ships built shortly before World War I. Designed in 1908, it fired a shell 30.5 cm (12 in) in diameter and entered service in 1911 when the four Helgoland-class battleships carrying it were commissioned into the High Seas Fleet.

It was also fitted on the subsequent five Kaiser and four König-class battleships and the three Derfflinger-class battlecruisers. The guns were used to great effect at the Battle of Jutland on 31 May – 1 June 1916, when the two Derfflinger-class ships, Derfflinger and Lützow, used them to destroy the British battlecruisers Queen Mary and Invincible. The gun was eventually superseded in German naval use by the much larger and more powerful 38 cm SK L/45.

Before World War I, 30.5 cm SK L/50 guns were emplaced on the islands of Helgoland and Wangerooge to defend Germany's North Sea coast. One battery was emplaced during the war to defend the port of Zeebrugge in Occupied Flanders. The guns on Helgoland were destroyed by the victorious Allies at the end of the war, but the battery at Wangerooge survived intact. Three of its guns were transferred to Helgoland after the island was remilitarized in 1935. During the Second World War, the other three guns were transferred to France and employed in coastal defense positions along the English Channel.

== Specifications ==
=== Naval Turrets ===
The 30.5 cm SK L/50 guns were mounted in twin gun turrets. The Helgoland-class ships used six C/1908 mountings; these turrets had 100 mm (3.9 in)-thick roofs and 300 mm (11.8 in)-thick sides. Later ship classes used improved designs. The Kaiser class carried five C/1909 gun houses, while the subsequent König class carried five turrets of the C/1911 type. The primary improvement for the LC/1909 turret was an increase in armor thickness of the roof, from 100 mm to 300 mm; side armor remained the same. The turret roofs on the LC/1911 mounts were reduced to 110 mm (4.3 in); again, the sides remained at a thickness of 300 mm. Derfflinger and Lützow used four C/1912 mountings, while their half sister Hindenburg carried an improved C/1913 type. The C/1912 mounts had 110 mm-thick roofs and 270 mm-thick sides. The turrets on the newer Hindenburg had the thickness of their roofs increased to 150 mm (5.9 in), though the sides were the same as in the preceding C/1912 type. Weights for the gun houses ranged from 534–549 tons (543–558 metric tons); the variations depended primarily on the thickness of armor.

In the König-class ships, each gun turret had a working chamber beneath it that was connected to a revolving ammunition hoist leading down to the magazine below. The turrets were electrically controlled, though the guns were elevated hydraulically. In an effort to reduce the possibility of a fire, everything in the turret was constructed of steel. This layout was also used in the preceding battleships. On the Derfflinger-class battlecruisers, the two forward and the superfiring rear turret used this configuration, although the rearmost gun turret had its magazine and shell room inverted.

All of the German gun turrets initially allowed for elevation to 13.5 degrees, which gave a maximum range of 187 hm (20,500 yd). During the Battle of Dogger Bank in January 1915, British ships had been able to open fire first, outside the range of the German guns, and it was examined how the range of the German guns could be improved. Increasing the maximum elevation of the guns would mean higher gun mounts, larger turrets and a significant increase in total weight. Instead the turrets were modified to compensate the increase of the maximum elevation to 16 degrees with a decrease of the maximum depression from -8 to -5.5 degrees. This correspondingly increased the range to 205 hm (22,400 yd). The centerline turrets on the warships could train 150 degrees in either direction, though the wing turrets on the Helgoland and Kaiser classes were limited to an arc of 80 degrees in either direction.

=== Coast defense mounts ===
A gun of Batterie Friedrich August on a BSG mount on Wangerooge Island

The island of Helgoland received four twin gun turrets between 1909 and 1912, although their exact type is unknown. Battery Kaiser Wilhelm II was built to protect the port of Zeebrugge in Occupied Flanders, and to cover the Scheldt estuary from a potential British landing, during World War I. It consisted of four guns in concrete barbettes mounted on Bettungsschiessgerüst (BSG) (firing platforms). These manually powered mounts rotated on a pivot at the front of the mount and the rear was supported by rollers resting on a semi-circular rail. They were equipped with a gun shield and capable of all-around fire. They were manned by sailors from Naval Artillery Regiment (Matrosen Artillerie Regiment) 1. Construction of the battery started in September 1915 and the battery was operational on 13 April 1916.

By the end of World War I, six guns in BSG mounts equipped Battery Friedrich August on the island of Wangerooge. Three of these were transferred to Helgoland after 1935 when Hitler renounced the Treaty of Versailles which had demilitarized the island. By 1938, they equipped Battery von Schröder and were manned by troops of the Second Naval Artillery Battalion (II. Marine-Artillerie-Abteilung), later 122nd Naval Artillery Battalion (122. Marine-Artillerie-Abteilung). After the French were defeated in 1940 all three guns were transferred to Le Trésorerie, near Boulogne-sur-Mer, France where they assumed their former name of Battery Friedrich August. These guns were initially in open barbettes with 360° traverse, but these were later rebuilt into concrete casemates with overhead cover. that could elevate to 50 degrees and train 220 degrees in either direction.

=== Ammunition ===
Derfflinger's forward gun turrets

These guns fired two types of shells during World War I: armor-piercing (AP) L/3.1 and high explosive (HE) L/4 types. During World War II, the guns fired a wider variety of shells, including armor-piercing L/3,4 and L/4,9 types, and high explosive L/3.8, L/5, and L/4.8 shells, as well as specially designed coast defense artillery projectiles. The AP and HE rounds weighed between 405 and 415 kg (915 lb), while the coastal artillery projectiles weighed only 250 kg (551 lb).

Shells used during World War I used an RP C/12 main propellant charge that weighed 91 kg (201 lb) and a smaller RP C/12 fore charge that weighed 34.5 kg (76 lb); this gave the guns a muzzle velocity of 855 meters per second (2,805 feet per second). Coast defense guns used RP C/32 charges that weighed 85.4 kg (188.3 lb) for the main charge and 41.6 kg (91.7 lb) for the fore charge. After 1942, these were increased to 121.5 kg (268 lb) RP C/38 for AP shells and 143 kg (315 lb) RP C/38 for HE rounds. These shells were fired with a muzzle velocity of between 850 and 855 m/s (2,789–2,805 ft/s), but the lightweight coast defense shell had a muzzle velocity of 1,120 m/s (3,700 ft/s).

Shell type and designation	Weight	Filling Weight	Muzzle velocity	Range
World War I
Armor-piercing shell (Pzgr L/3.1)	405.5 kg (894 lb)	13.6 kg (30 lb) (HE)	855 m/s (2,810 ft/s)	20.4 km (22,300 yd)
high-explosive shell (Sprenggranate L/4)	405.9 kg (895 lb)	26.4 kg	855 m/s (2,810 ft/s)	unknown
World War II
Armor-piercing shell (Pzgr L/3.4 (mit Haube))	405 kg (893 lb)	11.5 kg (25 lb) (HE)	855 m/s (2,810 ft/s)	32 km (35,000 yd)
Armor-piercing shell with ballistic cap (Pzgr L/4.9 (mit Haube))	415 kg (915 lb)	unknown	855 m/s (2,810 ft/s)	41.3 km (45,200 yd)
base-fused high-explosive shell (Sprenggranate L/3.8 m. Bdz.)	415 kg (915 lb)	unknown	850 m/s (2,800 ft/s)	unknown
base-fused HE shell (Sprenggranate L/5 m. Bdz.)	415 kg (915 lb)	unknown	850 m/s (2,800 ft/s)	unknown
nose-fuzed HE (Sprgr L/4.8 m. Kz.)	405 kg (893 lb)	26.5 kg (58 lb) (HE)	855 m/s (2,810 ft/s)	unknown
base- and nose-fused HE shell with ballistic cap (Sprgr L/3.6 m. Bdz. u. Kz. (mit Haube))	250 kg (550 lb)	14.5 kg (32 lb) (HE)	1,120 m/s (3,700 ft/s)	51.4 km (56,200 yd)

=== Performance ===
At 13.5 degrees of elevation, the 30.5 cm gun could hit targets out to 16,200 m (17,717 yards) with armor-piercing shells. After the turrets were improved to allow elevation to 16 degrees, the range correspondingly increased to 20,400 m (22,310 yd). At a range of 12,800 m (14,000 yd), the L3 armor-piercing shells fired by the gun were expected to penetrate 254 mm (10 in) of armor plate. At 15,000 m (16,000 yd) the effectiveness of the shell decreased; it was able to pierce 229 mm (9 in)-thick plate. The range of the World War II guns was significantly greater than the guns used in World War I. With the 405 kg shell at 45 degrees, the guns had a maximum range of 32,000 m (35,000 yd). With the 415 kg shell at 49.2 degrees, the range was 41,300 m (45,166 yd), and with the lighter 250 kg round at 49.1 degrees, the maximum range was 51,400 m (56,200 yd).

== See also ==
=== Weapons of comparable role, performance and era ===
- BL 12-inch Mk XI – XII naval gun - British contemporary guns
- Obukhovskii 12-inch/52-caliber Pattern 1907 gun - Russian contemporary gun
- 12-inch/50-caliber Mark 7 gun - U.S. contemporary gun
