= Friedrich von Ingenohl =

German admiral (1857–1933)

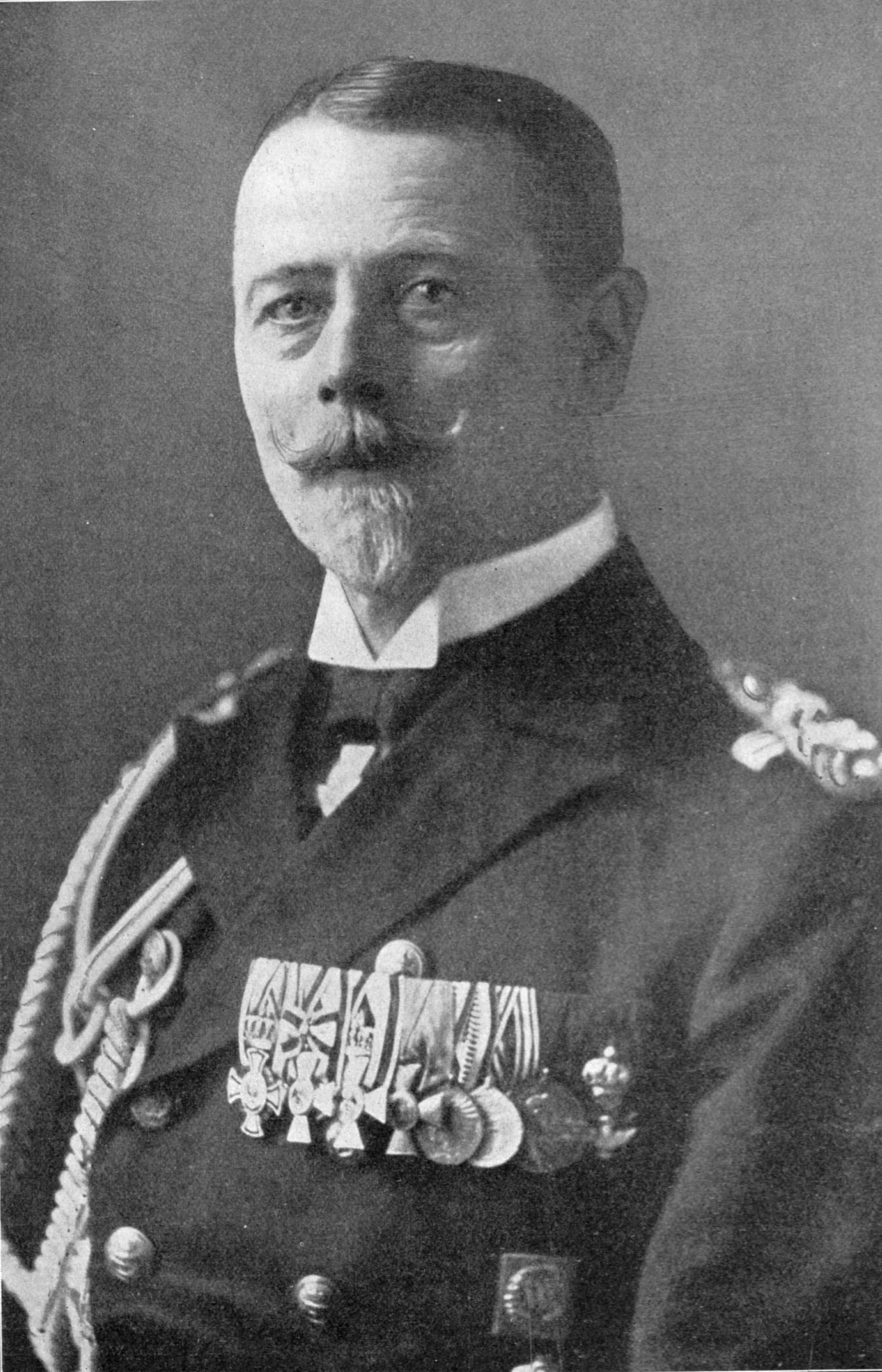
- Friedrich von Ingenohl
- Born: 30 June 1857; Neuwied
- Died: 19 December 1933 (aged 76); Berlin
- Military career
- Allegiance: German Empire
- Branch: Imperial German Navy
- Rank: Admiral
- Commands: German High Seas Fleet
- Conflicts: World War I

Gustav Heinrich Ernst Friedrich von Ingenohl (30 June 1857 – 19 December 1933) was a German admiral from Neuwied best known for his command of the German High Seas Fleet at the beginning of World War I.

He was the son of a tradesman. He joined the navy in about 1874, and spent many years in the Far East. He commanded the gunboat Iltis from 1894 to 1896, aboard which he observed the First Sino-Japanese War in 1895. He moved to the Admiralty in Berlin in 1897, and in 1904 became the commander of the Kaiser's yacht Hohenzollern. He became an admiral in 1908 and was elevated to the nobility on 27 January 1909, adding "von" to his name. He became commander of the High Seas Fleet in April 1913.

His intention of engaging the British Royal Navy in a quick, decisive battle was not supported by the German admiralty. Ingenohl repeatedly sought small engagements against the British fleet in order to provoke imprudent counterstrokes, in order to gain a crucial advantage for the German navy. The intended result did not materialize; in the first combat of this kind on 28 August 1914 at the Battle of Heligoland Bight, the German Imperial Navy (Kaiserliche Marine) lost three light cruisers and a torpedo boat to Royal Navy ships. After a similarly unsuccessful action on the Dogger Bank on 24 January 1915, Ingenohl yielded command of the High Seas Fleet on 2 February and was succeeded by Admiral Hugo von Pohl.

After the war, the Allies requested his extradition as a "war culprit", but Germany refused to comply. Ingenohl died in Berlin on 19 December 1933.

== Medals and awards ==
- Iron Cross 1st and 2nd classes
- Order of the Red Eagle 3rd class with crown
- House Order of Hohenzollern
- Order of the Red Eagle 4th class with bow
- Order of the White Falcon

Political offices
Preceded by Henning von Holtzendorff	Commander-in-Chief of High Seas Fleet of the Imperial German Navy; 1913-February 2, 1915	Succeeded by Hugo von Pohl
