= Martin Hills =

The Martin Hills (82°4′S 88°1′W) are an isolated range of predominantly ice-covered hills, or peaks, in Antarctica, nearly 4 nautical miles (7 km) long, lying about 50 nautical miles (90 km) south of the Pirrit Hills. The feature was positioned by the U.S. Ellsworth–Byrd Traverse Party on 10 December 1958, and was named by the Advisory Committee on Antarctic Names for Larry R. Martin, Scientific Leader at Byrd Station in 1962.
