= Ernst Lindemann =

German naval officer (1894–1941)

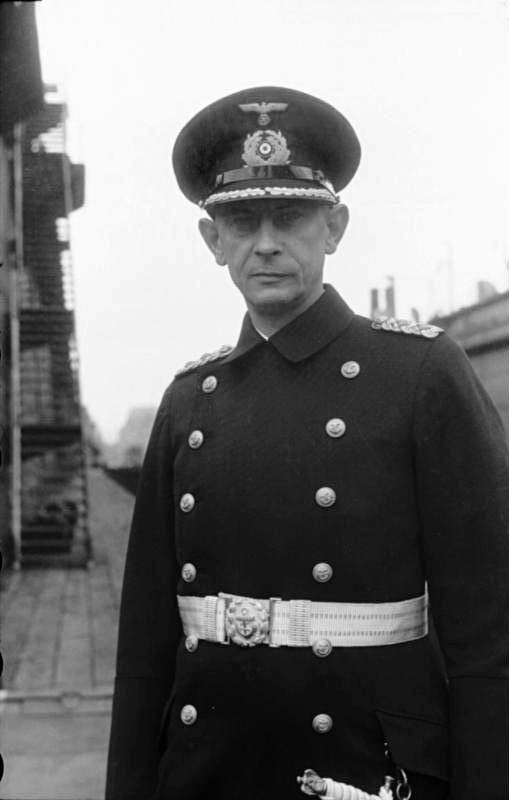
- Kapitän zur See Ernst Lindemann as commander of battleship Bismarck on 24 August 1940
- Born: 28 March 1894; Altenkirchen, German Empire
- Died: 27 May 1941 (aged 47); North Atlantic
- Relatives: Ernst Heinrich Lindemann (grandfather); Georg Lindemann (cousin)
- Military career
- Allegiance: German Empire (1913–18); Weimar Republic (1918–33); Nazi Germany (1933–41)
- Branch: Imperial German Navy; Reichsmarine; Kriegsmarine
- Service years: 1913–41
- Rank: Kapitän zur See (Captain)
- Units: SMS Hertha; SMS Lothringen; SMS Bayern; SMS Hannover; SMS Elsass; SMS Schleswig-Holstein; SMS Hessen; Heavy cruiser Admiral Scheer
- Commands: 1st Artillery Company, Friedrichsort; Ship Construction Dept, OKM; Naval Gunnery School; Bismarck
- Conflicts: World War I; Operation Albion; Scuttling of the German fleet at Scapa Flow; Spanish Civil War; World War II; Atlantic War; Operation Rheinübung; Battle of the Denmark Strait; Last battle of the battleship Bismarck †
- Awards: Knight's Cross of the Iron Cross (posthumously)

Otto Ernst Lindemann (28 March 1894 – 27 May 1941) was a German Kapitän zur See (naval captain). He was the only commander of the battleship Bismarck during its eight months of service in World War II.

Lindemann joined the German Imperial Navy (German: Kaiserliche Marine) in 1913, and after his basic military training, served on a number of warships during World War I as a wireless telegraphy officer. On board SMS Bayern, he participated in Operation Albion in 1917. After World War I, he served in various staff and naval gunnery training positions. One year after the outbreak of World War II, he was appointed commander of the battleship Bismarck, at the time the largest warship in commission anywhere in the world and the pride of the Kriegsmarine (Nazi Germany's navy).

In May 1941, Lindemann commanded Bismarck during Operation Rheinübung. Bismarck and the heavy cruiser Prinz Eugen formed a task force under the command of Admiral Günther Lütjens on board Bismarck. Orders were to break out of their base in German-occupied Poland and attack British merchant shipping lanes in the Atlantic Ocean. The task force's first major engagement was the Battle of the Denmark Strait, which resulted in the sinking of HMS Hood. Less than a week later, on 27 May, Lindemann and most of his crew died in Bismarck's last battle.

He was posthumously awarded the Knight's Cross of the Iron Cross (Ritterkreuz des Eisernen Kreuzes), at the time the second highest award in the military and paramilitary forces of Nazi Germany, the Oak Leaves to the Knight's Cross having been instituted on 3 June 1940. The medal was presented to his widow, Hildegard, on 6 January 1942.

== Early life ==
Otto Ernst Lindemann was born on 28 March 1894 in Altenkirchen in the Westerwald, Rhine Province. He was the first of three children of Dr. jur. Georg Heinrich Ernst Lindemann and Maria Lindemann, née Lieber. Known as Ernst, Georg Lindemann was a probationary judge (Gerichtsassessor) and later president of the Prussian Central Land Credit Company, a Prussian credit bank. (Note: The Prussian Central Land Credit Company (Preußische Central-Bodenkredit-Aktiengesellschaft AG) was a Prussian land and real estate public limited credit company formed in 1870. Today, after a number of mergers, the bank is part of the Eurohypo AG.) (Note: Ernst Lindemann (the elder) was a first cousin of Generaloberst (Colonel General) Georg Lindemann, and the son of Ernst Heinrich Lindemann (25 January 1833 – 8 May 1900), a lawyer and former mayor of Essen (1859–1868), Dortmund (1878–1886) and Düsseldorf (1886–1899).)

Otto Ernst Lindemann was baptised into the Protestant Church on 26 April 1894. The family moved to the Charlottenburg quarter of Berlin, where they lived at 6 Carmer Street, (Note: Carmer Street – Carmerstraße) in 1895. His younger brother—Kurt—was born in 1896, followed by a second brother, Hans-Wolfgang, in 1900. (Note: Dr. Kurt Lindemann (20 January 1896 – 26 April 1945), as a Major of the reserves in the German Army (Heer), was killed in action near Potsdam during the final days of World War II in Europe in 1945.) The family relocated again in 1903, this time to their own house in the Dahlem quarter of Berlin, near the Grunewald forest.

In 1910, when Lindemann was 16, his uncle Kapitän zur See Friedrich Tiesmeyer was in command of the light cruiser SMS Mainz (October 1909 – January 1910) of the Imperial Navy, at that time holding the rank of Fregattenkapitän (commander). (Note: Friedrich Tiesmeyer (15 October 1867 – 18 January 1917) was the son of pastor Ludwig Tiesmeyer (1835–1919) and Auguste Wilhelmine Luise Lindemann (1845–1897), Ernst Lindemann's paternal aunt.) At a family reunion in Hamelin, Lindemann talked with his uncle and heard of his seafaring adventures in the Far East. These conversations attracted Lindemann to a naval career.

Lindemann graduated from the Bismarck-Gymnasium (secondary school) in Berlin-Wilmersdorf with his Abitur (diploma) late in 1912 with an average-to-good overall rating. For the next six months, he attended the Royal Polytechnic Institution in Richmond, London.

== Personal life ==
Ernst Lindemann met Charlotte Weil (née Fritsche), a Berlin singer, in the spring of 1920. The couple married on 1 February 1921, and they had a daughter, Helga Maria, born on 26 February 1924. Lindemann's job as a naval officer demanded that he be away from his family for long periods of time. This proved to be too demanding on the marriage, and they were divorced in 1932. Lindemann was engaged again on 20 July 1933 to his youngest brother's sister-in-law, Hildegard Burchard. Hildegard was 14 years younger than Lindemann. They married on 27 October 1934 in the St. Annen Church in Berlin–Dahlem. The ceremony was performed by Martin Niemöller, a founder of the Confessing Church, later imprisoned as an anti-Nazi. They had a daughter, Heidi Maria, born on 6 July 1939.

== Naval career ==
=== Imperial Navy ===
On 26 March 1913, Lindemann traveled with his parents to Flensburg for his medical examination at the Naval Academy at Mürwik. The strong financial background of his parents made him a suitable applicant for the Imperial Navy, as the costs associated with a naval education in 1909 were 800–1,000 Marks per year for eight years. By comparison, a metal worker earned 1,366 Marks annually and a teacher 3,294 Marks. Only 5 percent of the German population at the time earned more than 3,000 Marks annually. However, the doctor certified him as fit only for limited duties (bedingt tauglich), as pneumonia in childhood had left him unfit for service in U-boats. After a second examination, he was accepted on probation, and Lindemann became one of the 290 young men of "Crew 1913" (the incoming class of 1913). He was officially enlisted in the Imperial Navy as a Seekadett (sea cadet) on 1 April 1913.

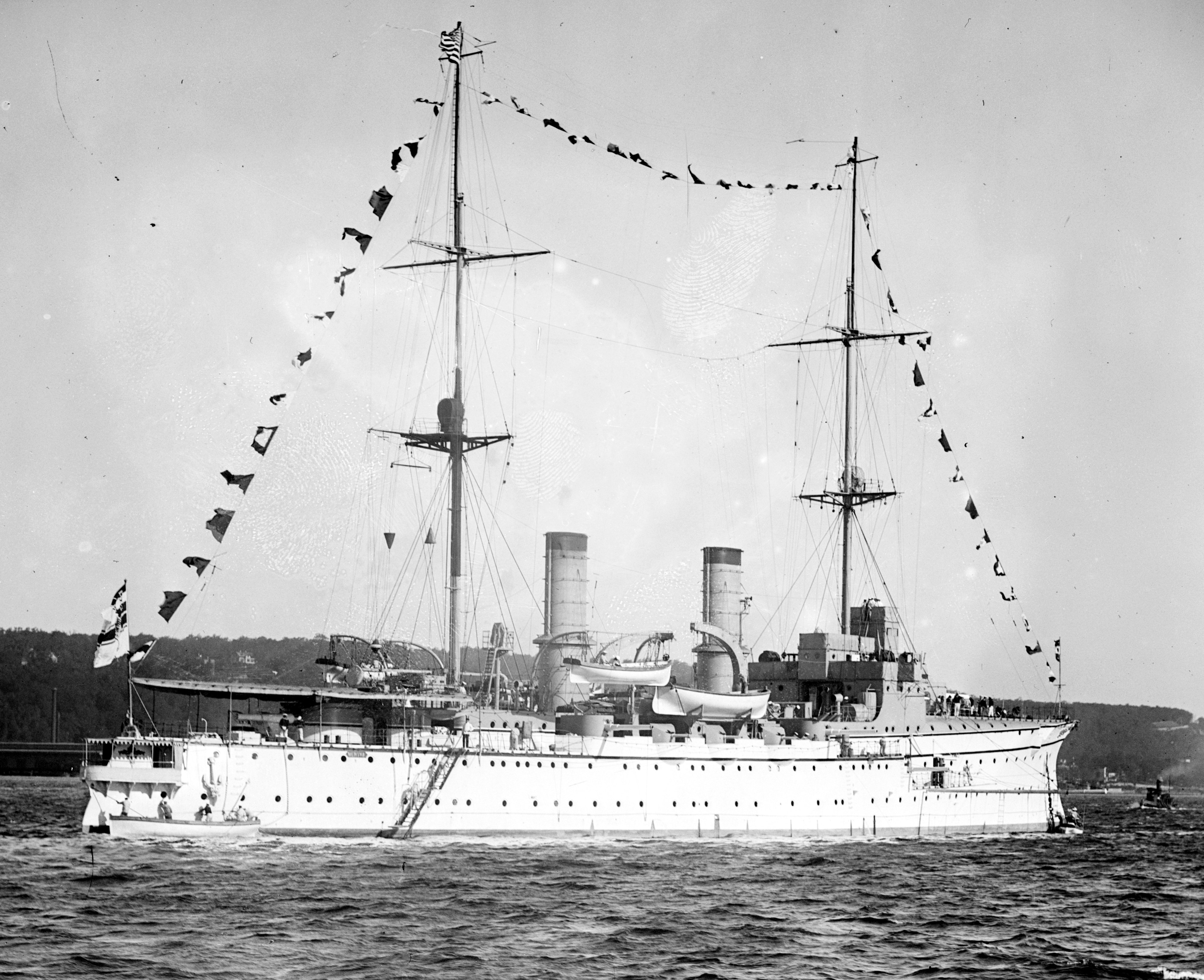
SMS Hertha

In early May 1913, the cadets of Crew 1913 were sent to the training ships SMS Hansa, SMS Hertha, SMS Victoria Louise and SMS Vineta. Lindemann was assigned to Hertha with 71 of his comrades. At that time, Hertha was under the command of Captain Heinrich Rohardt, a friend of his uncle Friedrich. Arriving on board on 9 May, they were divided into watches consisting of roughly 18 men each. Hertha left Mürwik and stayed in Kiel until the end of the month. On 29 May 1913, Hertha headed for Swinemünde, where she stayed until 15 June. The next stop, via Sassnitz and Visby, was Stockholm, Sweden, arriving on 24 June. The ship remained in Stockholm until 1 July, before leaving for Bergen in Norway. After a few days, the voyage continued to the Lönne Fjord. Here, Lindemann met his commander-in-chief—Kaiser Wilhelm II—for the first time. Hertha then returned to Germany, arriving in Wilhelmshaven on 8 August 1913.

One week later, Hertha began a seven-month training cruise (15 August 1913 – 12 March 1914). The voyage took Lindemann to Dartmouth in England, Vilagarcía de Arousa in Spain, Faial Island in the Azores and as far as Halifax in Nova Scotia. The return trip then went via Vera Cruz in Mexico, Havana in Cuba, Port-au-Prince in Haiti, Kingston in Jamaica, Port of Spain in Trinidad and then to the Canary Islands, Madeira, and the Spanish mainland, arriving back in Germany in the middle of March 1914, first in Brunsbüttel and two days later in Kiel. Lindemann was promoted to Fähnrich zur See (Ensign) on 3 April 1914.

=== World War I ===
With the German declaration of war in August 1914, all further training at the naval academy was terminated and the normal compulsory officer examination was skipped. The entire Crew 1913 was assigned to various units in the Imperial Navy. Lindemann was assigned to SMS Lothringen, a battleship which belonged to the 2nd Battle Squadron of the High Seas Fleet under the command of Vizeadmiral (vice admiral) Reinhard Scheer, (Note: 2nd Battle Squadron of the High Seas Fleet – II. Geschwader der Hochseeflotte) taking on the position of 3rd wireless telegraphy officer. (Note: 3rd wireless telegraphy officer – III. FT Offizier; Funktelegrafie) Lothringen was mostly tasked with patrolling the North Sea, sailing back and forth between Altenbruch (now part of Cuxhaven) and Brunsbüttel without engaging in combat. Lindemann left Lothringen on 1 June 1915 to attend the wireless telegraphy school at Mürwik. (Note: wireless telegraphy school – FT Schule) He successfully completed the course and returned from it in July 1915. He then took over the position of 2nd wireless telegraphy officer, a position that fellow officers joked suited his abnormally large ears. He was promoted to Leutnant zur See (Second Lieutenant) on 18 September 1915. (Note: telegraphy officer – II. FT Offizier)

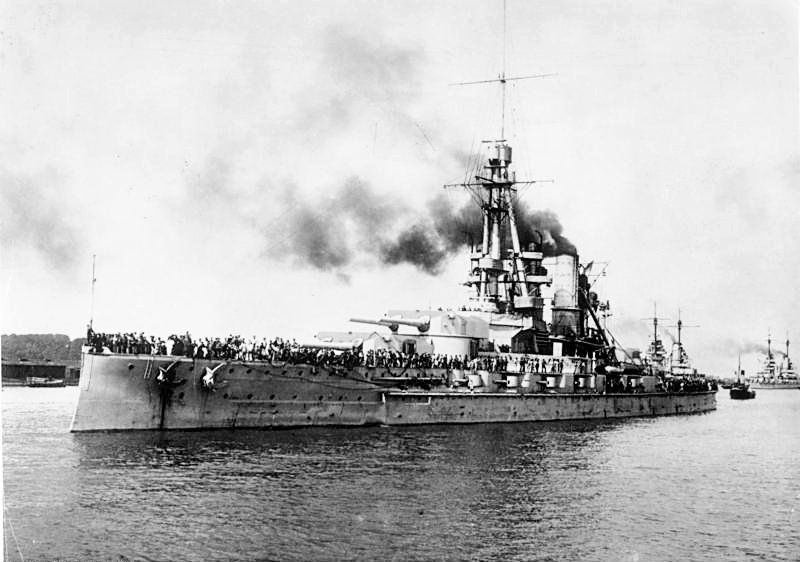
SMS Bayern on trials on the Kiel Canal.

On 19 March 1916, Lindemann was transferred to the newly commissioned battleship SMS Bayern (under the command of Captain Max Hahn), with the same rank of 2nd wireless telegraphy officer. Bayern, with her eight 38 cm (15 in) guns, was the most powerful ship of the fleet. Her crew had been largely assigned from Lothringen, which continued to serve as a training ship. Aboard Bayern, now under the command of Captain Rohardt, Lindemann participated in Operation Albion in September–October 1917. Operation Albion's objective was the invasion and occupation of the Estonian islands of Saaremaa (Ösel), Hiiumaa (Dagö) and Muhu (Moon), then part of the Russian Republic. At 05:07 on 12 October 1917, Bayern struck a mine while moving into her bombardment position to secure the landing beaches at Pamerort. Seven sailors were killed. Despite mine damage, Bayern engaged the coast defense battery at Cape Toffri on the southern tip of Hiiumaa. Bayern was released from her duties at 14:00 that day. Preliminary repairs were made on 13 October in Tagga Bay before she returned to Kiel on 1 November 1917.

After the armistice in 1918, Bayern—together with the majority of the German High Seas Fleet—was interned at Scapa Flow, the home of the British Grand Fleet. Bayern arrived there on 23 November 1918 with a skeleton crew of only 175 men, including Lindemann, who was then ordered to return to Germany, arriving in Kiel on 12 January. On 21 June 1919, Admiral Ludwig von Reuter ordered the scuttling of the fleet, and Bayern sank at 14:30.

=== Between the wars: Reichsmarine ===
When Ernst Lindemann returned to Germany, it was uncertain whether he could remain on active military service. As a result of the Treaty of Versailles which was signed on 28 June 1919, the former Imperial German Navy was downsized to 15,000 men, including 1,500 officers, while being renamed the Reichsmarine in the era of the Weimar Republic. As Lindemann had finished fifth in the Class of 1913, he stood a good chance of being retained. He served temporarily in the Dahlem Protection Company a part of the Protection Regiment of Greater Berlin (June–July 1919), (Note: Dahlem Protection Company – Schutzkompanie Dahlem) (Note: Protection Regiment of Greater Berlin – Schutz-Regiment "Groß-Berlin") before he became adjutant to the newly created chief of the Naval Command Department (1 August 1919 – 30 September 1922), (Note: Naval Command Department – Marinekommandoamt (A)) at the time under the command of William Michaelis. The Naval Command Department was directly subordinated to the Admiralty Staff. (Note: Admiralty Staff – Admiralstab) At the same time, he held the position of adjutant in the Fleet Department. (Note: Fleet Department – Flottenabteilung (A II)) During this assignment Lindemann was promoted to Oberleutnant zur See (Sub-Lieutenant) on 7 January 1920.

Lindemann's next assignment (1 October 1922 – 30 September 1924) was aboard the battleship Hannover, where he served as a watch and division officer. During this assignment, he attended an officers' course at the ships' gunnery school in Kiel between 5 February and 3 May 1924. From here, Lindemann took command of the 1st Artillery Company of the 3rd Coastal Defense Department in Friedrichsort in Kiel from 1 October 1924 – 26 September 1926. (Note: 1st Artillery Company – 1. (Artillerie) Kompanie) (Note: 3rd Coastal Defense Department – Küstenabwehrabteilung III – K.W.A. III) His commanding officer was Korvettenkapitän (Lieutenant Commander) Otto Schultze, a former World War I U-boat commander and later Generaladmiral (general admiral) of the Kriegsmarine. In this position, Lindemann was promoted to Kapitänleutnant (captain lieutenant) on 1 January 1925.

His next assignment (27 September 1926 – 6 September 1929) placed him on the Admiral's staff at the Baltic Naval Station, (Note: Baltic Naval Station – Marinestation der Ostsee) first as a staff officer and then as assistant to the chief of the station, which at the time was under the command of Vice Admiral Erich Raeder. From here, he was transferred to the Elsass serving as the second gunnery officer and Fähnrichsoffizier (officer in charge of cadets), responsible for the on-board training of the officer cadets, from 7 September 1929 – 25 February 1930. Holding the same rank and position, Lindemann then transferred to the Schleswig-Holstein.

=== Between the wars: Kriegsmarine ===
On 30 January 1933, the Nazi Party, under the leadership of Adolf Hitler, came to power in Germany, ushering in a period of naval rearmament. In 1935, the Reichsmarine was renamed the Kriegsmarine. Between 22 September 1931 and 22 September 1934, Lindemann was a senior lecturer at the Naval Gunnery School in Kiel. He was then posted to the Hessen under the command of Captain Hermann Boehm and served as first gunnery officer from 23 September 1933 to 8 April 1934. Ernst Lindemann was promoted to Korvettenkapitän on 1 April 1932. On 9 April 1934, he was ordered to the Wilhelmshaven Shipyard (9 April–11 November 1934) for training in ship construction and familiarisation with the heavy cruiser Admiral Scheer, under the command of Captain Wilhelm Marschall.

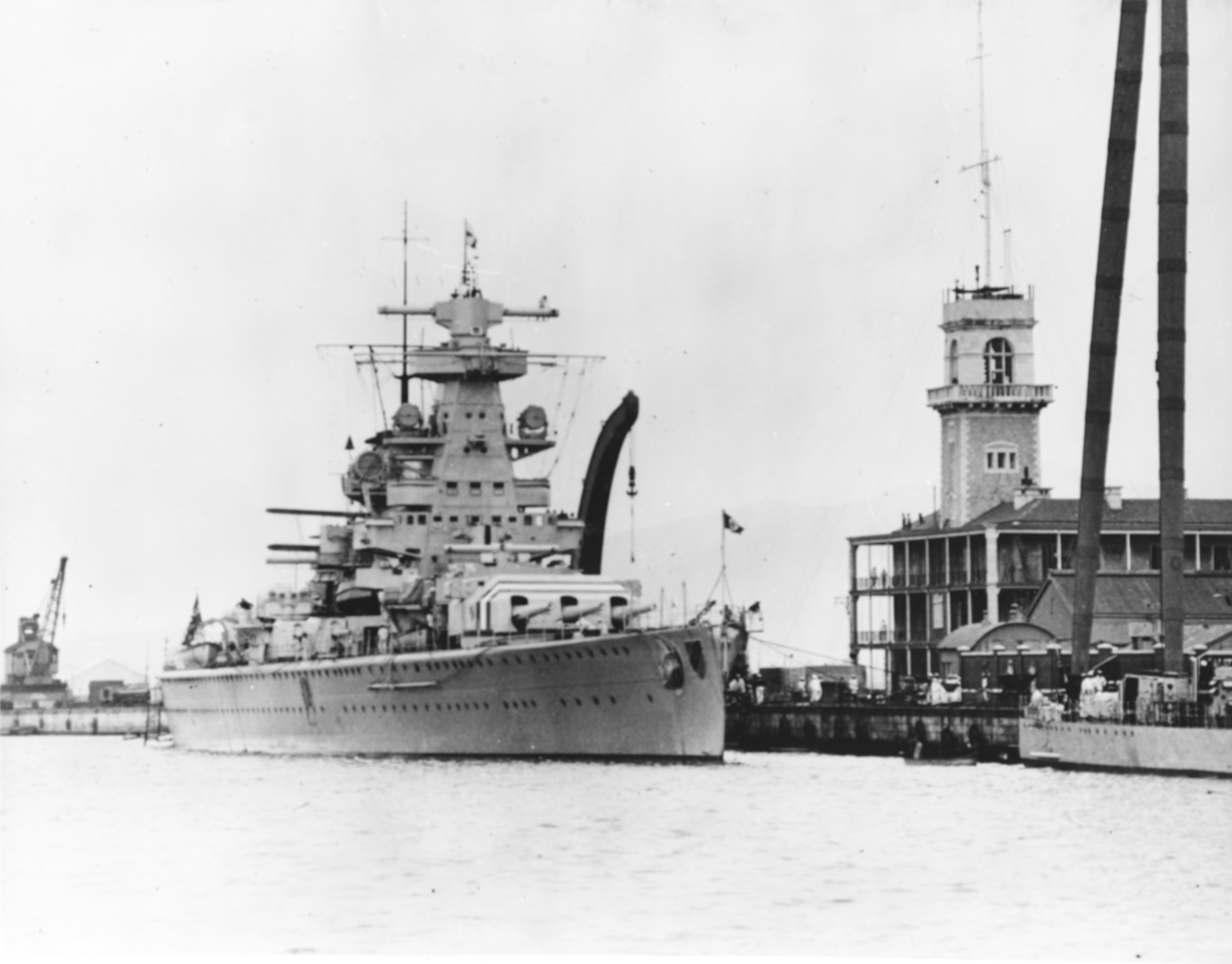
Admiral Scheer in the port of Gibraltar during the Spanish Civil War.

On Admiral Scheer, he again served as first gunnery officer, and in this position he participated in the Spanish Civil War (24 July–30 August 1936). Admiral Scheer had to make ready for the mission on short notice; the order came from Admiral Rolf Carls on 23 July 1936 at 13:45. The normal 48 hours required to prepare the ship was reduced to 12 hours, demanding a lot of the crew and especially Lindemann. As the first gunnery officer, Lindemann was responsible for handling and storing all munitions. Admiral Scheer and the cruiser Deutschland left Germany on 24 July at 08:00. Lindemann's main responsibilities included commanding the German landing parties and acting as diplomatic aid and interpreter for Captain Marschall. These landing parties consisted of up to 350 men, which included 11 officers, 15 non-commissioned officers and 266 sailors, or roughly one-third of the crew. On the return voyage to Germany, Admiral Scheer stopped at Gibraltar on the morning of 25 August 1936. Marschall, Lindemann and other officers met with the British Governor and Rear Admiral James Somerville. After Lindemann returned to Germany, he was promoted to Fregattenkapitän on 1 October 1936.

Between 1936 and 1938, he was an adviser and later head of the ship construction department at the Naval High Command, (Note: Naval High Command – Oberkommando der Marine) and at the same time a consultant to and later chief of the Naval Training Department. (Note: Naval Training Department – Marineausbildungsabteilung) On 1 April 1938, he was promoted to the rank of Kapitän zur See (captain at sea). On 30 September 1939, one month after the outbreak of World War II, Lindemann succeeded Captain Heinrich Woldag as commander of the Naval Gunnery School in Wik in Kiel, (Note: Naval Gunnery School – Schiffsartillerie-Schule – SAS) after Woldag took command of the heavy cruiser Blücher. Under his command were three training departments, the gunnery training ship Bremse and Hektor, numerous gunnery training boats, gun carriers, auxiliary vessels, and occasionally Hitler's state yacht, the aviso Grille.

=== Commander of the battleship Bismarck ===
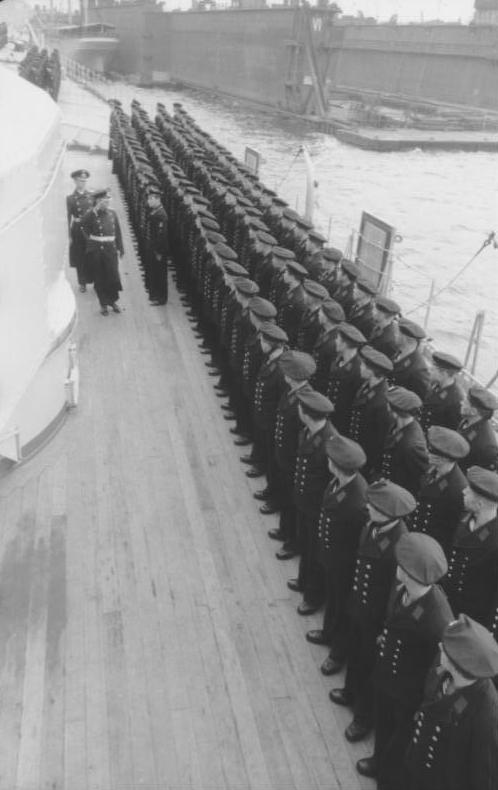
Ernst Lindemann, followed by Bismarck's Executive Officer Hans Oels, inspecting the crew on 24 August 1940.

Ernst Lindemann was frustrated by the fact that—as commander of the Naval Gunnery School—he would never come into direct contact with the enemy. When he received the news that he had been selected to be the first commander of the battleship Bismarck, he was honoured by the trust that had been bestowed on him but doubted that he would be able to get Bismarck ready for action before the war was over. His doubts suggest that he was confident the war would end in a favourable outcome for Germany by mid-1940. Prior to commanding Bismarck, Lindemann had never held any shipboard command, a situation rare if not unique in the Kriegsmarine. Nevertheless, Lindemann had served exclusively on ships with a gun calibre of at least 28 cm (11 in), and he was Germany's leading gunnery expert. In 1940, he ranked second out of Crew 1913 and was considered an outstanding leader.

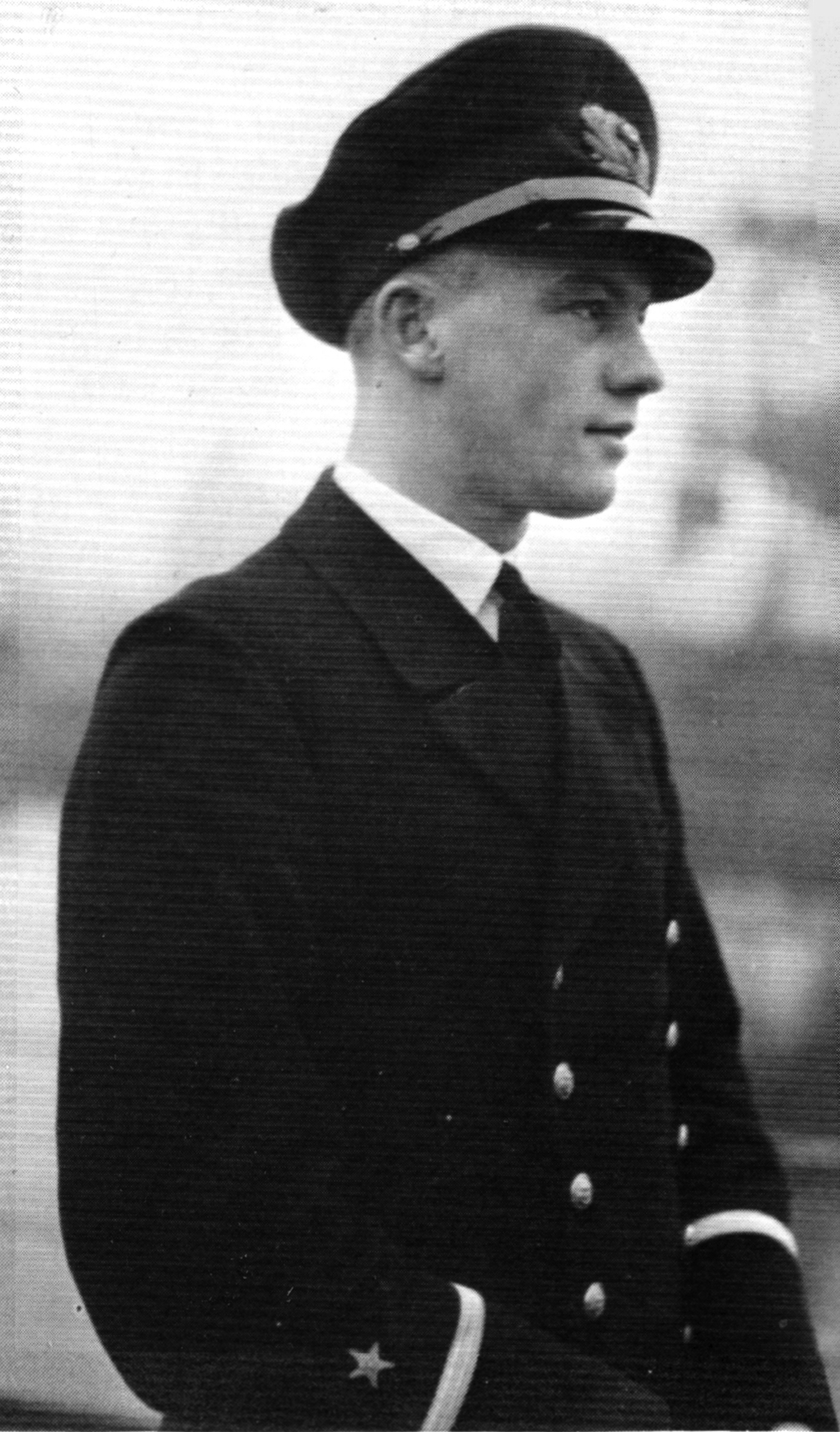
Burkard Freiherr von Müllenheim-Rechberg

Lindemann arrived at the Blohm & Voss shipbuilding works in Hamburg at the beginning of August 1940. Bismarck's keel had been laid on 1 July 1936 and she was launched on 14 February 1939. Burkard Freiherr von Müllenheim-Rechberg joined Bismarck as fourth gunnery officer in June 1940, and he would become the highest-ranking officer to survive Bismarck's last battle on 27 May 1941. Much of what is currently known about Bismarck's final days is attributed to his account as a witness. Lindemann made Von Müllenheim-Rechberg his personal adjutant and instructed him to refer to the ship as "he" rather than "she"; Lindemann considered the ship too powerful to be referred to as a female. He commissioned the battleship on 24 August 1940. He showed a great deal of attachment to the ship and was respected by his crew.

Bismarck left the Kiel Fjord on the morning of 28 September 1940 heading east. After an uneventful voyage through rough seas, Bismarck reached Gotenhafen (now Gdynia) the next day. Here Bismarck conducted a number of sea trials in the relative safety of the Bay of Danzig (now Gdańsk Bay). By 30 November 1940, Lindemann had set a number of tests for the crew, which they passed easily. During high speed trials, Bismarck reached a top speed of 30.8 kn (57.0 km/h; 35.4 mph), exceeding the design speed. However, one weakness quickly became apparent: without using the rudders but only the screw propellers, Bismarck was almost impossible to steer.

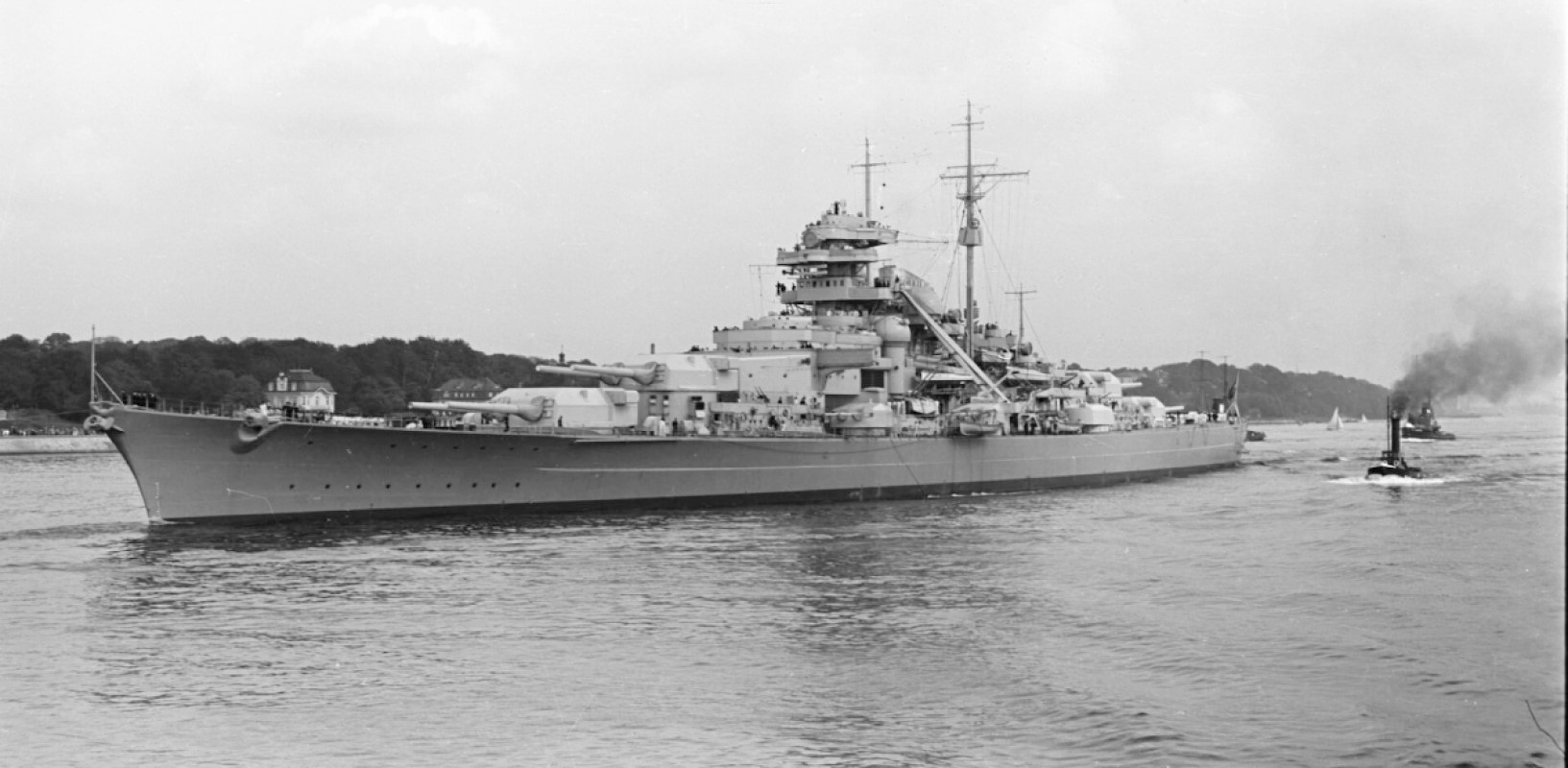
Bismarck left Hamburg for the first time on 15 September 1940.

In November 1940, Von Müllenheim-Rechberg was sent to the Naval Gunnery School at Wik to complete his heavy gun training courses, which ended his position as Lindemann's personal adjutant. Lindemann's new adjutant was the signals officer Second Lieutenant Wolfgang Reiner. Bismarck's heavy guns were first test-fired in the second half of November, and Bismarck was shown to be a very stable gun platform. After the 1940 Christmas celebration on board, Lindemann and the majority of the officers, non-commissioned officers and sailors went on home leave. First gunnery officer Lieutenant Commander Adalbert Schneider relieved Lindemann as Bismarck's commander during his absence. Lindemann spent his leave with his wife and daughter and returned on 1 January 1941.

On 28 April 1941, the ship and crew were ready, and stores were on board for a three-month mission. Lindemann notified Naval High Command (Oberkommando der Marine), Naval Groups North and West (Marinegruppen Nord und West) and Fleet Command that Bismarck was ready for action. The Chief of Fleet—Admiral Günther Lütjens—and his fleet staff held drills for the first time on board Bismarck on 13 May, testing the communication chain between Fleet Command and Bismarck's officers.

Adolf Hitler—accompanied by Generalfeldmarschall Wilhelm Keitel, his former naval adjutant Commander Karl-Jesko von Puttkamer, and his Luftwaffe adjutant Oberst Nicolaus von Below, among others—visited Bismarck on 5 May 1941. Missing was Grand Admiral Erich Raeder. Hitler was taken on a tour of the ship by Admiral Lütjens and inspected the various battle stations. Hitler and Lütjens also met in private and discussed the risks of a mission in the North Atlantic. After this meeting, Hitler and the officers of Bismarck had lunch in the officers' mess, where Hitler spoke about America's unwillingness to enter the war. Lindemann openly disagreed with Hitler, expressing his opinion that the possibility of the United States entering the war could not be ruled out.

=== Operation Rheinübung ===
Operation Rheinübung and Royal Navy operations (black lines) against the battleship Bismarck and heavy cruiser Prinz Eugen (red lines).

The goal of Operation Rheinübung (Rhine Exercise) was for Bismarck and the heavy cruiser Prinz Eugen—under the command of Lindemann's Crew 1913 classmate Captain Helmuth Brinkmann—to break into the Atlantic and attack Allied shipping. Grand Admiral Raeder's orders to the task force commander—Admiral Günther Lütjens—were that "the objective of the Bismarck is not to defeat enemies of equal strength, but to tie them down in a delaying action, while preserving combat capacity as much as possible, so as to allow Prinz Eugen to get at the merchant ships in the convoy" and "The primary target in this operation is the enemy's merchant shipping; enemy warships will be engaged only when that objective makes it necessary and it can be done without excessive risk."

At 02:00 on 19 May 1941, Bismarck and Prinz Eugen left Gotenhafen and proceeded through the Baltic Sea and out toward the Atlantic. Unknown to Lütjens, the British had intercepted enough signals to infer that a German naval operation might occur in the area. The German task force was first encountered by the Swedish seaplane-cruiser Gotland on 20 May heading north-west past Gothenburg. The British Admiralty was informed through a Norwegian officer in Stockholm who had learned of the sighting from a Swedish military intelligence source. Alerted by this report, British Admiralty requested air reconnaissance of the Norwegian coast. A Spitfire reconnaissance aircraft found and photographed the German task force in the Grimstad fjord (60°19.49′N 5°14.48′E), near Bergen, at 13:15 on 21 May. On the evening of 23 May at 19:22, the German force was detected by the heavy cruisers HMS Suffolk and Norfolk that had been patrolling the Denmark Strait in the expectation of a German breakout. The alarm was sounded and Lindemann announced at 20:30 over the intercom: "Feind in Sicht an Backbord, Schiff nimmt Gefecht auf". (Enemy sighted to port. Engage!) Bismarck fired five salvos without scoring a direct hit. The heavily outgunned British cruisers retired to a safe distance and shadowed the enemy until their own heavy units could draw closer. However, Bismarck's forward radar had failed as a result of vibration from the heavy guns firing during this skirmish, and Lütjens was obliged to order Prinz Eugen to move ahead of Bismarck in order to provide the squadron with forward radar coverage.

At the Battle of the Denmark Strait on 24 May 1941, HMS Hood was sunk, probably by Bismarck. The hydrophones on Prinz Eugen detected a foreign ship to port at 05:00. The Germans sighted the smokestacks of two ships at 05:45, which the first gunnery officer Lieutenant Commander Adalbert Schneider initially reported as two heavy cruisers. The first British salvo revealed them to be battleships, but not until the British task force turned to port was their precise identity revealed. The British ships started firing at the German task force at 05:53. Vice-Admiral Lancelot Holland planned on targeting Bismarck first, but due to the reversed German battle order, Hood opened fire on the Prinz Eugen instead. The German task force was still waiting for the order to commence firing, which Admiral Lütjens did not give immediately. Two minutes later, after multiple inquiries by Schneider, "Frage Feuererlaubnis"? (Permission to open fire?), an impatient Lindemann responded: "Ich lasse mir doch nicht mein Schiff unter dem Arsch wegschießen. Feuererlaubnis!" (I'm not letting my ship get shot out from under my arse. Open fire!) (Note: This quotation is cited by Burkard Freiherr von Müllenheim-Rechberg, who at the time was in the rear gun director watching for Suffolk and Norfolk and listening to Schneider's gunnery commands over the fire control intercom. It was most likely reported by a surviving crew member who overheard the conversation between Schneider and Lindemann over the gunnery telephone.) At 06:01, the fifth salvo by Bismarck, fired at a range of about 180 hectometres (18,000 m; 20,000 yd), was seen to hit Hood abreast her mainmast. It is likely that one 38 cm (15 in) shell struck somewhere between Hood's mainmast and 'X' turret aft of the mast. (Note: Hood carried eight 42-calibre BL 15-inch Mark I guns. These guns were mounted in the hydraulically powered Mark II twin turrets which were designated 'A', 'B', 'X' and 'Y' from front to rear.) A huge jet of flame burst out from Hood from the vicinity of the mainmast. This was followed by a devastating magazine explosion that destroyed the aft part of the ship. This explosion broke the back of Hood, and she sank in only three minutes, her nearly vertical bow last to descend into the water.

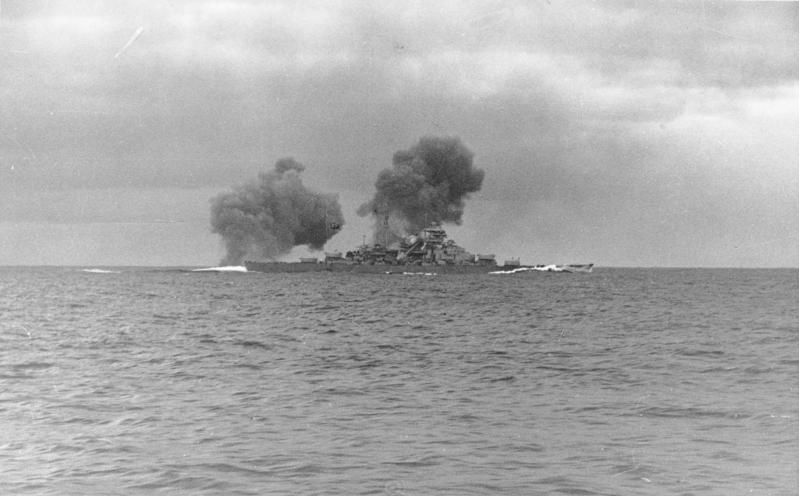
Bismarck firing at HMS Prince of Wales on 24 May 1941 as seen from Prinz Eugen.

Following the explosion, Prince of Wales was targeted by both German ships and disengaged from combat after seven direct hits, four by Bismarck and three by Prinz Eugen, at about 06:09. During this brief engagement, Prince of Wales had also hit Bismarck three times, first striking the commander's boat and putting the seaplane catapult amidships out of action. The second shell passed right through the bow from one side to the other. The third struck the hull underwater and burst inside the ship, flooding a generator room and damaging the bulkhead of an adjoining boiler room, partially flooding it. The damage caused to Bismarck by these two shots allowed 2,000 t (2,200 short tons) of water into the ship.

Lindemann and Lütjens at this point differed on how best to continue the mission. Lindemann, as commander of a battleship, was guided by the tactical situation, and wanted to hunt down the damaged Prince of Wales. (The Germans did not at that time know the ship to be Prince of Wales, but knew that it was a King George V-class battleship.) Lütjens, apparently mindful of the fleet order to avoid unnecessary contact with similar enemy units, rejected this without discussion. Lindemann and Lütjens also differed on where to take the ship for repairs; Lindemann advocated retracing their route through the Denmark Strait and returning to Bergen, Norway. Lütjens overruled him and ordered a course set for Saint-Nazaire, France. In the afternoon, Admiral Lütjens ordered Prinz Eugen to break away from Bismarck and operate independently against the enemy's merchant shipping. Prinz Eugen and Bismarck separated at 18:14 that evening. Prinz Eugen arrived safely at Brest, France on 1 June 1941. No direct witnesses to this difference of opinion survived the sinking, but Matrosengefreiter (Leading Seaman) Heinz Staat, the helmsman on the bridge, remembered a telephone call between the First Watch Officer, Commander Hans Oels, and a fleet staff officer which suggested that Lindemann had been trying to persuade Lütjens to pursue the enemy. A messenger returning to his comrades below spoke of "dicke Luft" ("thick air" or a "bad atmosphere") on the bridge.

Bismarck was sunk three days later, after a concentrated effort by Britain's Royal Navy. At 23:30 (local time 19:30) on 24 May an attack was made by a small group of nine Swordfish biplane torpedo bombers of 825 Naval Air Squadron under the command of Eugene Esmonde from the aircraft carrier HMS Victorious. One hit was scored, which killed Oberbootsmann Kurt Kirchberg, but caused only superficial damage to the Bismarck's armoured belt. In mid-morning at 10:30 on 26 May, an RAF Coastal Command Catalina reconnaissance aircraft from 209 Squadron RAF spotted Bismarck roughly 700 nautical miles (1,300 km; 810 mi) west of Saint-Nazaire. The British battle group Force H, under the command of Admiral James Somerville, whose main units were the aircraft carrier HMS Ark Royal, the First World War era battlecruiser HMS Renown and the cruiser HMS Sheffield, was ordered to stop Bismarck. At 19:15 that evening, 15 Swordfish from Ark Royal launched an attack. The air raid alarm was sounded on Bismarck at 20:30. Roughly 15 minutes into the attack Bismarck was possibly hit by one torpedo, and at around 21:00 another single torpedo jammed Bismarck's rudder 12° to port. Damage-control parties laboured to regain steering control and uncoupled and centred the starboard rudder, but failed to free the port rudder. With asymmetric power applied, speed reduced to 8 kn (15 km/h; 9.2 mph), Bismarck was on a converging course with the Royal Navy units on the chase. The alarm sounded again at 23:00 when destroyers of the 4th Destroyer Flotilla under the command of Captain Philip Vian attacked Bismarck. Throughout the night Bismarck was targeted by incessant torpedo attacks by HMS Cossack, Sikh, Maori, Zulu, and ORP Piorun, denying Lindemann and the crew much-needed rest.

Bismarck's alarm sounded for the last time at 08:00 on the morning of 27 May 1941. Norfolk sighted the Bismarck at 08:15, and the battleship HMS Rodney opened fire on Bismarck at 08:48. Bismarck returned fire at 08:49. Further involved in the final battle were the battleship HMS King George V and the cruisers Norfolk and HMS Dorsetshire. Torpedo bombers did not participate in the final battle. Bismarck's forward command position was hit at 08:53, and both forward gun turrets were put out of action at 09:02, killing Adalbert Schneider in the main gun director. The after command position was destroyed at 09:18 and turret Dora was disabled at 09:24. Bismarck received further heavy hits at 09:40, resulting in a fire amidships, and turret Caesar went out of action after a hit at 09:50. All weapons fell silent at 10:00. Short of fuel, Rodney and King George V had to disengage prior to Bismarck's sinking. The Germans were preparing to scuttle Bismarck when three torpedoes fired by Dorsetshire hit the ship's side armour. Bismarck sank at 10:36 at position 48°10′N 16°12′W, roughly 300 nmi (560 km; 350 mi) west of Ouessant (Ushant). The cruiser Dorsetshire saved 85 men, and the British destroyer Maori saved 25. A further five sailors were saved by German submarine U-74 under the command of Kapitänleutnant Eitel-Friedrich Kentrat and the weather observation ship Sachsenwald. The Befehlshaber der U-Boote (U-boats Commander-in-Chief) Karl Dönitz had ordered U-556 under the command of Kapitänleutnant Herbert Wohlfarth to pick up Bismarck's war diary. Out of torpedoes and low on fuel, Wohlfarth requested that the order be transferred to U-74. U-74 failed to reach Bismarck on time and the war diary was never retrieved.

=== Death ===
Burkard von Müllenheim-Rechberg saw Lindemann for the last time at around 08:00 on the command bridge just prior to the final battle. Von Müllenheim-Rechberg described the normally intelligent, humorous and optimistic Lindemann as pessimistic and withdrawn. Von Müllenheim-Rechberg tried to talk to him and was ignored, and later wondered whether this was due to combat fatigue or whether the disagreements with Lütjens had worn him down.

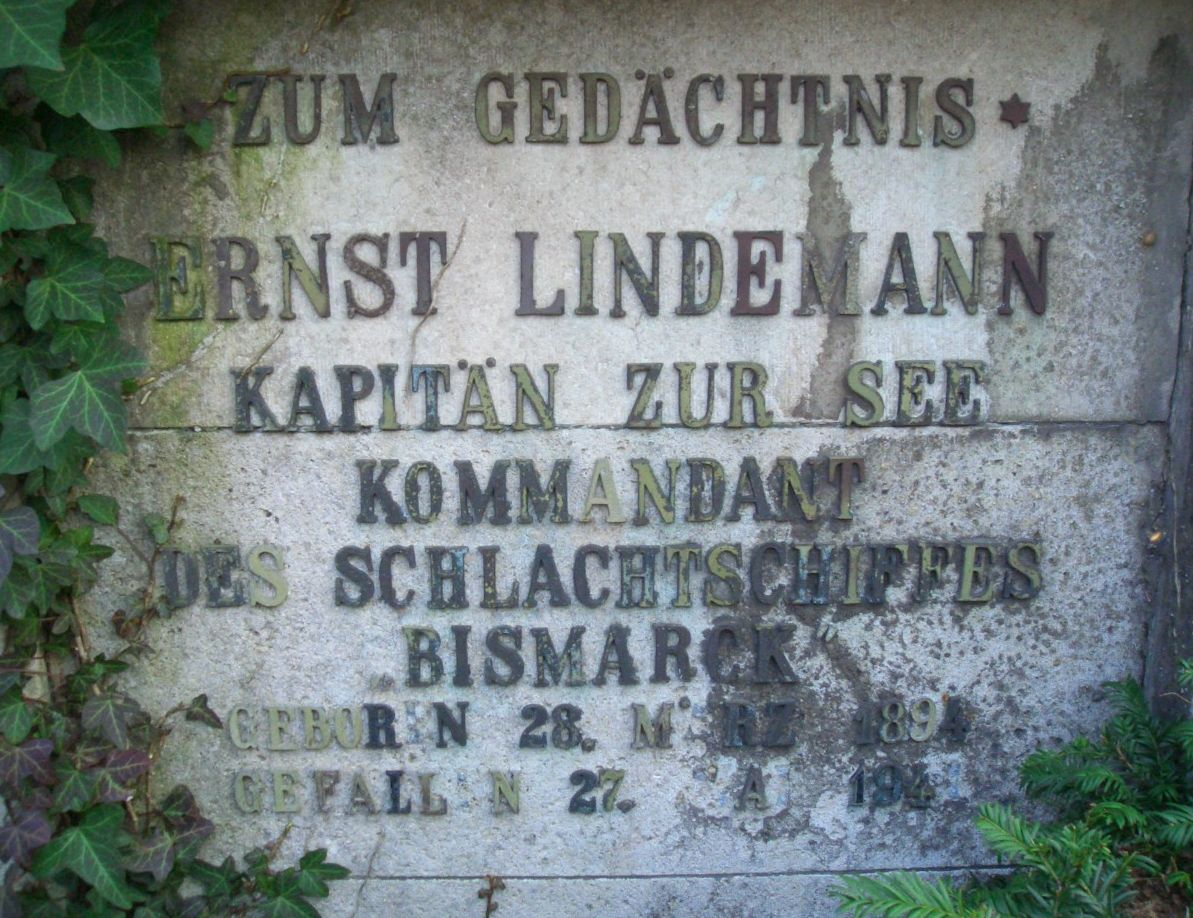
The Lindemann family plot at Cemetery Dahlem, Berlin, inscription in memory of Captain Ernst Lindemann.

Lindemann's body was never recovered, and it is thought that he, Lütjens and other officers were probably killed in action when shellfire from the British warships landed on Bismarck's bridge at 09:02. When Robert Ballard, the oceanographer responsible for finding RMS Titanic discovered the wreck of the Bismarck in 1989, he found that most of the forward superstructure had been blasted away by shells and there were more than 50 shell holes around the area of the conning tower. This may support the theory.

Alternatively, Lindemann may have left his combat position when the ship's controls were rendered inoperable—and prior to the lethal hit on the command position—in order to give the command to abandon the ship. The surviving Matrose Paul Hillen—who had managed to escape to the upper deck in the final phase of the battle—stated that he had seen a group of 20–30 people standing at the bow, among them a man with a white peaked cap. Normally on a German naval vessel at sea, a white cap is worn only by the commanding officer. In addition, the surviving Maschinengefreiter—Rudolf Römer, who at the time was already in the water—claimed that he had seen Lindemann standing on the bow, near Bismarck's forward 38 cm turret, Anton. (Note: Bismarck had four 38 cm SK C/34 dual gun turrets. The two forward turrets were Anton and Bruno. The aft turrets were Caesar and Dora.) He was said to be with his combat messenger, a leading seaman, and apparently trying to persuade his messenger to save himself. In this account, his messenger took Lindemann's hand while the two walked to the forward flagmast. As the ship turned over, the two stood briefly to attention, and then Lindemann and his messenger saluted. As the ship rolled to port, the messenger fell into the water. Lindemann continued his salute while clinging to the flagmast, going under with the ship.

=== Knight's Cross of the Iron Cross ===
Lindemann's comrades of Crew 1913 all contacted the young widow after his death. The former head of Crew 1913, Captain Otto Klüber, contacted Mrs Lindemann in the fall of 1941 and offered her an honorary membership. Shortly after Christmas on 27 December 1941, exactly seven months after the sinking of Bismarck and the death of its commander, Captain Ernst Lindemann received a posthumous Knight's Cross of the Iron Cross. He received this high award because the Oberkommando der Marine felt that his skilled leadership significantly contributed to the destruction of the British battlecruiser Hood and the damage inflicted on the British battleship Prince of Wales. Lindemann was the 94th recipient of the Knight's Cross of the Iron Cross in the Kriegsmarine.

Lindemann's first gunnery officer—Lieutenant Commander Adalbert Schneider—had been awarded the Knight's Cross of the Iron Cross on 27 May 1941. Traditionally, the commanding officer would have received this award before any other crew member was so honoured. This exception had been criticized by various circles in the Wehrmacht. It is thought likely that Ernst Lindemann's cousin, the former General der Kavallarie (General of the Cavalry) Georg Lindemann, intervened. Grand Admiral Erich Raeder, with whom Lindemann shared a 20-year comradeship dating to the early days of the Reichsmarine, presented the Knight's Cross of the Iron Cross to Mrs Lindemann on Tuesday, 6 January 1942, in Dahlem. Raeder went on to provide moral and emotional support to Lindemann's mother and widow.

== Awards and honours ==
- Iron Cross (1914)
  - 2nd Class
  - 1st Class (27 September 1919)
- Friedrich August Cross, 2nd class
- Ottoman War Medal (Turkish: Harp Madalyası), known as the "Gallipoli Star" or "Iron Crescent"
- Honour Cross of the World War 1914/1918 (6 December 1934)
- Service Award (Dienstauszeichnung) 2nd to 4th Class (2 October 1936)
- Service Award (Dienstauszeichnung) 1st Class (16 March 1938)
- Spanish Naval Merit Cross (Cruz del Mérito Naval) 3rd Class (6 June 1939)
- Spanish Naval Merit Cross in White (Cruz Naval con distintivo Blanco) (21 August 1939)
- Spanish Naval Merit Cross in Gold (Cruz Naval con distintivo Amarillo) 3rd Class (21 August 1939)
- Swedish Royal Order of the Sword (Kungliga Svärdsorden) (11 January 1941)
- War Merit Cross, 2nd Class with Swords (20 January 1941)
- Clasp to the Iron Cross (1939)
  - 2nd and 1st Class (May 1941)
- Knight's Cross of the Iron Cross on 27 December 1941 (posthumously) as captain and commander of battleship Bismarck
- High Seas Fleet Badge (posthumously 1 April 1942)

=== Lindemann Battery ===
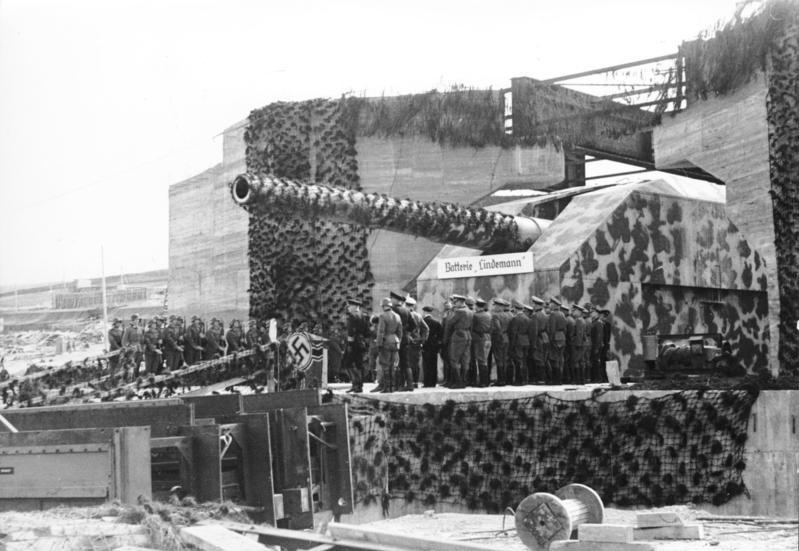
Battery Lindemann in 1942.

To honour the late Captain Lindemann, the heavy naval battery at Sangatte, between Calais and Boulogne was christened "Batterie Lindemann" (the Lindemann Battery) on 19 September 1942 by the admiral in command of the Channel Coast Friedrich Frisius. The battery consisted of three heavy 40.6 cm (16 in) SK C/34 guns housed in casemates, originally intended for the early H-class battleships. Prior to this, the guns had been referred to as "Batterie Schleswig-Holstein" or "Batterie Groß-Deutschland" and were located in the Hel Peninsula, Poland. The battery was destroyed by Canadian forces on the evening of 26 September 1944. Today the structure is partly covered by excavated material from the Channel Tunnel, and only the command bunker with a number of smaller strong points are still visible.

== In popular culture ==
Austrian actor Carl Möhner played Captain Ernst Lindemann in the 1960 black-and-white British war film Sink the Bismarck! The film was based on the novel The Last Nine Days of the Bismarck by C. S. Forester.
