= Adalbert Schneider =

First Gunnery Officer on battleship Bismarck

- Adalbert Schneider
- Born: 10 March 1904; Halle (Saale)
- Died: 27 May 1941 (aged 37); Atlantic Ocean
- Military career
- Allegiance: Weimar Republic (to 1933); Nazi Germany
- Branch: Reichsmarine; Kriegsmarine
- Service years: 1922–41
- Rank: Fregattenkapitän (posthumously)
- Units: SKS Niobe; Berlin; Hannover "Pocket battleship" Deutschland; Light cruiser Nürnberg; Battleship Bismarck
- Conflicts: World War II: Atlantic War; Operation Rheinübung; Battle of the Denmark Strait; Last battle of the battleship Bismarck †
- Awards: Knight's Cross of the Iron Cross

Adalbert Schneider (10 March 1904 – 27 May 1941) was the First Gunnery Officer on board the battleship Bismarck, and was awarded the Knight's Cross of the Iron Cross for the sinking of HMS Hood on 24 May 1941 in the Battle of the Denmark Strait. Less than a week later, on 27 May 1941, Schneider and the majority of Bismarck's crew were killed in action during Bismarck's last battle.

== Naval career ==
Adalbert Schneider was born on 10 March 1904 in Halle (Saale) in the Province of Saxony, at the time a province of the Kingdom of Prussia. He joined the German navy on 30 March 1922. He received his first infantry training in the 3rd Company of Coastal Defence Department 3 (3. Kompanie Küstenwehr-Abteilung (K.W.A) III). On 4 October 1922 Schneider went on board Hannover, the first of his ship based trainings. Following Hannover, he went on board SKS Niobe on 4 April 1923 and Berlin on 2 July 1923. He was promoted to Leading Seaman (Matrosengefreiter) on 1 April 1923. Schneider then attended an officer candidate (Fähnrich) course at the Naval Academy Mürwik in Flensburg-Mürwik on 30 March 1924, and was shortly after promoted to midshipman (Fähnrich zur See) on 1 April 1924.

After the officers candidate training, Schneider attended a torpedo course for midshipmen at the Torpedo and Communication School (Torpedo- und Nachrichtenschule) at Flensburg-Mürwik on 1 April 1925, followed by a pathfinder course for midshipmen (Fähnrichs-Sperr-Lehrgang) at the experimental pathfinder and demonstration command (Sperrversuchs- und Lehrkommando) at Kiel-Wik on 3 June 1925.

=== Operation Rheinübung ===
The goal of the Operation Rheinübung (Rhine Exercise) was for Bismarck, under the command of Kapitän zur See Ernst Lindemann, and the heavy cruiser Prinz Eugen, under the command of Kapitän zur See Helmuth Brinkmann, to break into the Atlantic and attack Allied shipping. Großadmiral Erich Raeder's orders to the Chief-of-Fleet Admiral Günther Lütjens were that "the objective of the Bismarck is not to defeat enemies of equal strength, but to tie them down in a delaying action, while preserving the combat capacity as much as possible, so as to allow Prinz Eugen to get at the merchant ships in the convoy" and "The primary target in this operation is the enemy's merchant shipping; enemy warships will be engaged only when that objective makes it necessary and it can be done without excessive risk."

At 02:00 on 19 May 1941, Bismarck and Prinz Eugen left Gotenhafen (now Gdynia) and proceeded through the Baltic Sea and out towards the Atlantic. Unbeknownst to Lütjens, the British had intercepted enough communications to infer that a German naval operation might be about to occur in the area. Bismarck and Prinz Eugen passed the Great Belt on 20 May, and around noon the next day the task force dropped anchor in the Grimstad fjord (60°19.49′N 5°14.48′E) at Bergen, Norway. There Prinz Eugen took on fuel from the tanker Wollin. Schneider's brother, Oberfeldarzt (Field Doctor) Dr. Otto Schneider, who was stationed in Norway, briefly visited his brother on board Bismarck. Dr. Schneider was one of the last men to leave Bismarck on the evening of 21 May at around 22:00. Dr. Schneider later claimed that his brother was convinced that Bismarck and Prinz Eugen were being sent on a suicide mission.

On the evening of 23 May at 19:22, the German force was detected by the heavy cruisers HMS Suffolk and Norfolk that had been patrolling the Denmark Strait in the expectation of a German breakout. The alarm was sounded and Bismarck fired five salvos without scoring a direct hit. The heavily outgunned British cruisers withdrew to a safe distance and shadowed the enemy until their own heavy units could draw closer. However, Bismarck's forward radar had malfunctioned as a result of the vibration from the heavy guns firing during this skirmish, and Lütjens was obliged to order Prinz Eugen to move ahead of Bismarck in order to provide the squadron with forward radar coverage.

=== Battle of the Denmark Strait ===
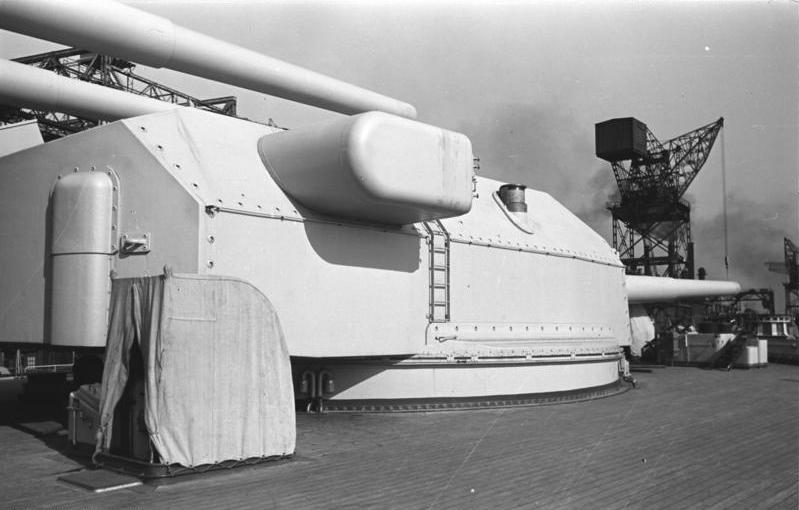
Turret Anton, the most forward of Bismarck's four dual 38 cm SK C/34 naval gun turrets. Each turret had a crew of 94 men and could fire every 18 seconds.

At the Battle of the Denmark Strait on 24 May 1941, HMS Hood was sunk, probably by Bismarck. The hydrophones on Prinz Eugen detected the sounds of an unknown ship to port at 05:00. The Germans sighted the smoke stacks of two ships at 05:45, which triggered the alarm on Bismarck. Schneider initially reported them as two heavy cruisers. The first British salvo revealed them as battleships, but not until the British task force turned to port were their precise identities revealed. The British ships started firing at the German force at 05:53. Vice Admiral Lancelot Holland planned on targeting Bismarck first, but due to the reversed battle order, Prince of Wales and Hood opened fire on the Prinz Eugen instead. The commander of the Prince of Wales, Captain John Leach, detected this error and directed his guns to fire on Bismarck. The German task force was still waiting for the order to commence firing. The commander of the German task force, Admiral Lütjens, did not give this order immediately. Two minutes into the battle and after multiple inquiries by Schneider, "Frage Feuererlaubnis?" (Requesting permission to open fire?) an impatient Lindemann responded: "Ich lasse mir doch nicht mein Schiff unter dem Arsch wegschießen. Feuererlaubnis!" (I'm not letting my ship get shot out from under my arse. Open fire!). This Lindemann quotation is cited by Burkard Freiherr von Müllenheim-Rechberg who at the time was in the after gun director keeping a watch out for Suffolk and Norfolk and listening to Schneider's commands over the gunnery intercom. This conversation most likely was passed down by a surviving crew member who overheard the conversation between Schneider and Lindemann. Von Müllenheim-Rechberg, Lindemann's personnel adjutant, would become the highest-ranking officer to survive the Bismarck's last battle on 27 May 1941. A lot of what we know today about the final days of Bismarck is attributed to his account as a witness.

Bismarck fired its first salvo at 05:55, first firing Anton and Bruno turrets and after a while Cesar and Dora turrets, referred to as a "demi salvo". (Note: Bismarck had four dual 38 centimetres (15 in) SK C/34 gun turrets. Its two forward turrets were Anton and Bruno. The aft turrets were Caesar and Dora.) These shells were reported to have fallen short of the target, so Schneider corrected the range and lateral displacement and ordered a 4 hectometres (400 m; 440 yd) bracket, (Note: Bracketing is a method for determining range by firing shells both beyond and short of a target.) observing the long salvo to be "over" and judging the short salvo to be on target. Schneider then ordered a full salvo (broadside), followed by two more broadsides in rapid fire. This fifth salvo of 38 centimetres (15 in) shells fired at 06:01 at a range of about 180 hectometres (18,000 m; 20,000 yd), was seen to hit Hood near her mainmast, and one shell probably struck somewhere between Hood's mainmast and "X" turret, aft of the mast. (Note: Hood carried eight 42 calibre BL 15-inch Mark I guns. These guns were mounted in the hydraulically powered Mark II twin turrets which were designated 'A', 'B', 'X' and 'Y' from forward to aft.) There was no immediately visible explosion, and Schneider was heard to remark: "Nanu, war das ein Blindgänger? Der hat sich wohl reingefressen." (Was that a dud? It definitely chewed its way in.) Then a huge jet of flame burst out of Hood from near the mainmast, followed by a devastating magazine explosion that destroyed the after part of the ship. This explosion broke the back of Hood, and the last sight of the ship, which sank in only three minutes, was her bow, nearly vertical in the water.

Following the explosion HMS Prince of Wales was targeted by both German ships. She disengaged from combat at about 06:09, after seven direct hits; four by Bismarck and three by Prinz Eugen. However, during this brief engagement Prince of Wales had also hit Bismarck three times. One shot struck the commander's boat and put the seaplane catapult amidships out of action. The second shell passed right through the bow from one side to the other. The third struck the hull plates underwater and burst inside the ship, flooding a generator room and damaging the bulkhead to an adjoining boiler room, partially flooding it also. These last two hits allowed 2,000 metric tons (2,000 long tons; 2,200 short tons) of water into the ship.

Bismarck's firing details
Time	Salvo fired by turrets	Target	Result
05:55	1st Anton and Bruno; 1st Cesar and Dora	Hood	Miss
05:56	2nd Anton and Bruno; 2nd Cesar and Dora	Hood	Miss
05:57	3rd Anton and Bruno; 3rd Cesar and Dora	Hood	Hit the fire control tower
05:58	4th Anton and Bruno; 4th Cesar and Dora	Hood	Miss
05:59	5th Anton and Bruno; 5th Cesar and Dora	Hood	Hit, Hood explodes
06:00	6th Anton and Bruno; 6th Cesar and Dora	Hood	Miss
06:01	7th Anton and Bruno; 7th Cesar and Dora	Prince of Wales	Miss
06:02	8th Anton and Bruno; 8th Cesar and Dora	Prince of Wales	Hit on compass platform
06:03	9th Anton and Bruno; 9th Cesar and Dora	Prince of Wales	Two hits, one on ship's stern under the waterline and one on the 133 mm secondary fire control director on the starboard side
06:04	10th Anton and Bruno; 10th Cesar and Dora	Prince of Wales	Hits the Supermarine Walrus aircraft crane
06:05	11th Anton and Bruno; 11th Cesar and Dora	Prince of Wales	Miss
06:06	12th Anton and Bruno	Prince of Wales	Miss
06:07	12th Cesar and Dora	Prince of Wales	Miss
06:08	13th Anton and Bruno	Prince of Wales	Miss
06:09	13th Cesar and Dora	Prince of Wales	Miss

=== The pursuit ===
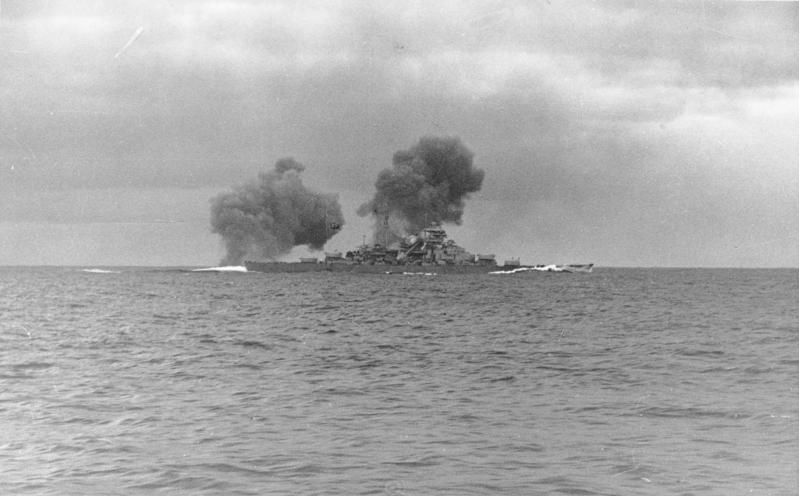
Bismarck firing at HMS Prince of Wales on 24 May 1941 as seen from Prinz Eugen.

The Bismarck was sunk less than a week later after a concentrated effort by Britain's Royal Navy. At 23:30 (local time 19:30) on 24 May an attack was made by a group of nine Swordfish biplane torpedo bombers of 825 Naval Air Squadron led by Lieutenant Commander Eugene Esmonde from the aircraft carrier HMS Victorious. One hit was scored, causing only superficial damage to the Bismarck's armoured belt, but killing Oberbootsmann Kurt Kirchberg. In mid-morning at 10:30 on 26 May a Coastal Command Catalina reconnaissance aircraft from 209 Squadron RAF spotted Bismarck roughly 700 nautical miles (1,300 km) west of St. Nazaire. The British battle group Force H, under the command of Admiral James Somerville, whose main units were the aircraft carrier HMS Ark Royal, the First World War era battlecruiser HMS Renown and the cruiser HMS Sheffield was ordered to stop Bismarck. At 19:15 that evening, 15 Swordfish from Ark Royal took off to launch an attack. The air raid alarm was sounded on Bismarck at 20:30. Roughly 15 minutes into the attack Bismarck was potentially hit by a torpedo, and at around 21:00 a single torpedo jammed Bismarck's rudder.

At 02:17 on the morning of 27 May 1941, Group West received a transmission from Bismarck recommending Schneider for the Knight's Cross of the Iron Cross. At 03:51 a reply confirmed that the medal had been awarded by Hitler. Matrosengefreiter Adolf Eich later witnessed Admiral Günther Lütjens and Kapitän zur See Ernst Lindemann shaking his hand after the award was made. The news that Adalbert Schneider had received the award was announced in the German press on 5 June 1941.

Bismarck's alarm sounded for the last time at 08:00 on the morning of 27 May 1941. Norfolk sighted the Bismarck at 08:15 and the British battleship Rodney opened fire on Bismarck at 08:47. Bismarck returned fire at 08:49. Further involved in the final battle were the battleship HMS King George V and the cruisers Norfolk and Dorsetshire. Torpedo bombers did not participate in the final battle. Bismarck's forward command position was hit at 08:53 and both forward gun turrets were put out of action at 09:02. The after command position was destroyed at 09:18 and turret Dora was disabled at 09:24. Bismarck received further heavy hits at 09:40, resulting in a fire amidships. Turret Caesar was put out of action at 09:50. All weapons went silent at 10:00. Rodney and King George V had to disengage prior to Bismarck's sinking due to lack of fuel. The Germans started preparing for the self destruction of Bismarck when three torpedoes fired by Dorsetshire hit Bismarck's side armour. Bismarck sank at 10:36 at position 48°10′N 16°12′W, roughly 300 nautical miles (560 km; 350 mi) west of Ouessant (Ushant). The cruiser Dorsetshire saved 85 men, the British destroyer Maori 25 German sailors. A further five sailors were saved by the German submarine U-74 under the command of Kapitänleutnant Eitel-Friedrich Kentrat and the weather observation ship Sachsenwald.

=== Death ===

Burkard Freiherr von Müllenheim-Rechberg was monitoring the gunnery intercom, and reports on the last minutes of Schneider's life. Schneider reported the heavy and middle guns ready for combat, and gave the order to open fire. The first salvo was fired by Rodney at 08:47 followed by King George V at 08:48. Schneider fired a partial salvo at Rodney since the Bismarck rear turrets could not fire at the appropriate angle. Schneider's aim was good, and he reported the first three salvos as short, on target and over. Schneider continued firing at Rodney. King George V and a little later Rodney turned to pass Bismarck's port side, a maneuver which Bismarck could not counter due to the damaged rudders. Bismarck started oscillating around her center axis which threw Schneider's aim off and necessitated continuous lateral displacement corrections of the guns. Bismarck started receiving heavy hits. The main gun director was destroyed, then turrets Anton and Bruno malfunctioned. Schneider was killed at 09:02 when an 8-inch shell from HMS Norfolk hit his combat position in the main gun director. Schneider was posthumously promoted to Commander (Fregattenkapitän) with an effective date of 1 May 1941. However this promotion is not on his personnel file.

== Awards ==
- Dienstauszeichnung 4th Class (2 October 1936)
- Dienstauszeichnung 3rd Class (2 October 1936)
- Order of Merit of the Republic of Hungary (20 August 1938)
- Iron Cross (1939)
  - 2nd Class (30 July 1940)
  - 1st Class
- High Seas Fleet Badge (1941)
- Knight's Cross of the Iron Cross on 27 May 1941 as Korvettenkapitän and 1st Gunnery Officer on the battleship "Bismarck"

=== Radio communication regarding the Knight's Cross ===
Time, date	Original German wording	Direct English translation
02:17, 27 May 1941	Flottenchef an Oberbefehlshaber der Kriegsmarine: Beantrage Verleihung Ritterkreuz an Korvettenkapitän Schneider für Versenkung Hood.	Chief of Fleet to the Commander-in-Chief of the Navy: Requesting award of Knight's Cross to Korvettenkapitän Schneider for the sinking of Hood.
03:51, 27 May 1941	Oberbefehlshaber der Kriegsmarine an Korvettenkapitän Schneider, nachrichtlich Flottenchef: Der Führer hat Ihnen für Versenkung Schlachtkreuzer Hood Ritterkreuz verliehen. Herzlichen Glückwunsch.	Commander-in-chief of the Kriegsmarine to Korvettenkapitän Schneider; copy to Chief of Fleet: The Führer has awarded you the Knight's Cross for sinking battlecruiser Hood. Sincere congratulations.

== Promotions ==
Date	Promotion
1 April 1923	Matrosengefreiter (seaman 2nd class)
1 April 1924	Fähnrich zur See (Midshipman)
1 October 1926	Leutnant zur See (Second Lieutenant at sea)
1 July 1928	Oberleutnant zur See (First Lieutenant at sea)
1 October 1934	Kapitänleutnant (Captain Lieutenant)
1 August 1938	Korvettenkapitän (Corvette Captain)
1 May 1941	Fregattenkapitän (Frigate Captain), not in his personnel file
