= SMS Bayern =

Battleship of the German Imperial Navy

- Bayern, probably during her internment at Scapa Flow

History

German Empire
- Name: SMS Bayern
- Namesake: Kingdom of Bavaria
- Builder: Howaldtswerke, Kiel
- Laid down: 22 December 1913
- Launched: 18 February 1915
- Commissioned: 15 July 1916
- Fate: Scuttled in Gutter Sound, Scapa Flow, 21 June 1919; Re-floated and broken up 1935

General characteristics
- Class & type: Bayern-class battleship
- Displacement: Normal: 28,530 t (28,080 long tons); Full load: 32,200 t (31,700 long tons)
- Length: 180 m (590 ft 7 in) loa
- Beam: 30 m (98 ft 5 in)
- Draft: 9.4 m (30 ft 10 in)
- Installed power: 14 × water-tube boilers; 35,000 metric horsepower (35,000 shp)
- Propulsion: 3 × steam turbines; 3 × screw propellers
- Speed: 22 knots (41 km/h; 25 mph)
- Range: 5,000 nmi (9,300 km; 5,800 mi) at 12 knots (22 km/h; 14 mph)
- Crew: 42 officers; 1,129 enlisted men
- Armament: 8 × 38 cm (15 in) SK L/45 guns; 16 × 15 cm (5.9 in) SK L/45 guns; 4 × 8.8 cm (3.5 in) SK L/45 guns; 5 × 60 cm (24 in) torpedo tubes
- Armor: Belt: 170–350 mm (6.7–13.8 in); Conning tower: 400 mm (15.7 in); Deck: 60 mm–100 mm (2.3–3.9 in); Turrets: 200 to 350 mm (7.9 to 13.8 in)

SMS Bayern (Note: "SMS" stands for "Seiner Majestät Schiff", or "His Majesty's Ship". Bayern is the German name for Bavaria.) was the lead ship of the Bayern class of dreadnought battleships in the German Kaiserliche Marine (Imperial Navy). The vessel was launched in February 1915 and entered service in July 1916, too late to take part in the Battle of Jutland. Her main armament consisted of eight 38 cm (15 in) guns in four turrets, which was a significant improvement over the preceding König's ten 30.5 cm (12 inch) guns. (Note: The 38 cm gun fired a 750-kilogram (1,650 lb) shell while the 30.5 cm gun fired a 405 kg (893 lb) shell. Bayern had a broadside weight of 6,000 kg (13,000 lb) with all eight guns while König's ten guns had a broadside weight of 4,050 kg (8,930 lb). See: Campbell & Sieche, p. 140.) The ship was to have formed the nucleus for a fourth battle squadron in the High Seas Fleet, along with three of her sister ships. Of the other ships only one—Baden—was completed; the other two were canceled later in the war when production requirements shifted to U-boat construction.

Bayern was commissioned midway through the war, and had a limited service career. The first operation in which the ship took part was an abortive fleet advance into the North Sea on 18–19 August 1916, a month after she had been commissioned. The ship also participated in Operation Albion in the Gulf of Riga, but shortly after the German attack began on 12 October 1917, Bayern was mined and had to be withdrawn for repairs. She was interned with the majority of the High Seas Fleet at Scapa Flow in November 1918 following the end of World War I. On 21 June 1919, Admiral Ludwig von Reuter ordered the fleet to be scuttled; Bayern sank at 14:30. In September 1934, the ship was raised, towed to Rosyth, and scrapped.

== Design ==
Armor layout for Bayern; the numbers represent the armor thickness in millimeters in each area

Design work on the Bayern class began in 1910 in the context of the Anglo-German naval arms race, with initial discussions focused on the caliber of the main battery; previous German battleships had carried 30.5 cm (12 in) guns, but as foreign navies adopted 34 cm (13.5 in) and 35.6 cm (14 in) weapons, the German naval command felt the need to respond with larger guns of their own. They considered 32 cm (12.6 in), 38 cm (15 in), and 40 cm (15.7 in) guns. Admiral Alfred von Tirpitz, the State Secretary of the Reichsmarineamt (Imperial Naval Office), was able to use public outcry over the Agadir Crisis to pressure the Reichstag (Imperial Diet) into appropriating additional funds for the Kaiserliche Marine (Imperial Navy) to offset the additional cost of the larger weapons. The design staff settled on the 38 cm caliber since the 40 cm was significantly more expensive and the 38 cm gun marked a significant improvement over existing German guns.

Bayern was 179.4 m (588 ft 7 in) long at the waterline, and an even 180 m (590 ft 7 in) long overall. She had a beam of 30 m (98 ft 5 in) and a draft of 9.3–9.4 m (30 ft 6 in – 30 ft 10 in) Bayern displaced 28,530 metric tons (28,080 long tons) at a normal displacement; at full combat load, she displaced up to 32,200 t (31,700 long tons). Bayern was powered by three Parsons steam turbines, with steam provided by three oil-fired and eleven coal-fired Schulz-Thornycroft water-tube boilers. Her propulsion system was rated at 35,000 metric horsepower (35,000 shp) for a maximum speed of 21 knots (39 km/h; 24 mph), and on trials achieved 55,967 metric horsepower (55,201 shp) for a maximum speed of 22 knots (41 km/h; 25 mph). (Note: Parsons operated a branch in Germany named Turbinia, which provided British-built turbines to the German navy, as well as commercial shipping companies. See: Weir, p. 95.) The ship could carry up to 3,400 t (3,300 long tons; 3,700 short tons) of coal and 620 t (610 long tons; 680 short tons) of fuel oil, which provided a maximum range of 5,000 nmi (9,300 km; 5,800 mi) at a cruising speed of 12 kn (22 km/h; 14 mph).

The ship was the first German warship armed with eight 38 cm (15 in) SK L/45 guns. (Note: In Imperial German Navy gun nomenclature, "SK" (Schnelladekanone) denotes that the gun is quick loading, while the L/45 denotes the length of the gun. In this case, the L/45 gun is 45 calibers, meaning that the gun is 45 times as long as it is in bore diameter.) The main battery guns were arranged in four twin gun turrets: two superfiring turrets each fore and aft. Her secondary armament consisted of sixteen 15 cm (5.9 in) SK L/45 guns, four 8.8 cm (3.5 in) SK L/45 guns and five 60 cm (23.6 in) underwater torpedo tubes, one in the bow and two on each beam. Upon commissioning, she carried a crew of 42 officers and 1,129 enlisted men. The ship had an armored belt that was 170–350 mm (6.7–13.8 in) thick and an armored deck that was 60–100 mm (2.4–3.9 in) thick. Her forward conning tower had 400 mm (15.7 in) sides, and the main battery turrets had 350 mm thick sides and 200 mm (7.9 in) thick roofs.

== Service history ==
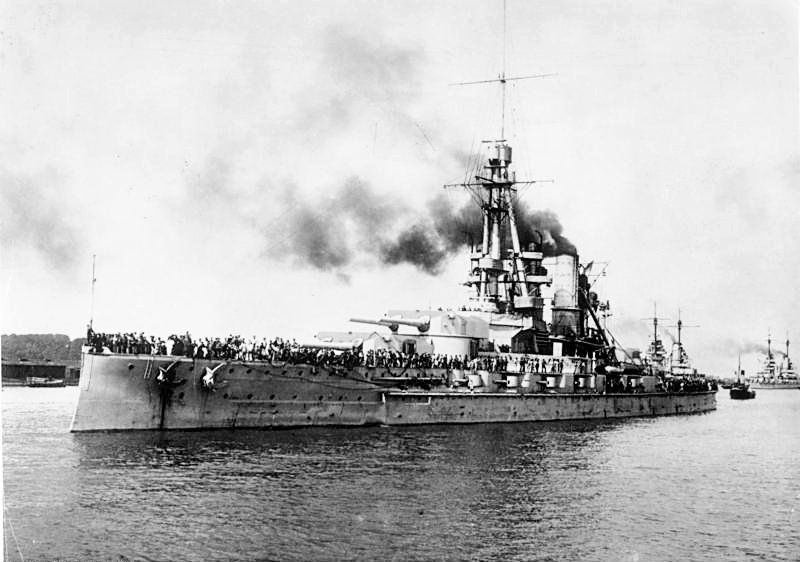
Bayern in the Kaiser Wilhelm Canal while commissioned for sea trials

Bayern was ordered with the provisional name "T" in 1912, (Note: German warships were ordered under provisional names. Additions to the fleet were given a single letter; ships intended to replace older or lost vessels were ordered as "Ersatz (name of the ship to be replaced)".) under the fourth and final Naval Law, which was passed that year. Work began at the Howaldtswerke Dockyard in Kiel under construction number 590. The ship was laid down on 22 December 1913 and launched on 18 February 1915. After fitting out, she was commissioned on 18 March 1916, but remained largely idle in port for the next month, undergoing initial tests, including inclination tests to determine how the vessel responded to flooding. She got underway on 15 April for initial trials of her main battery, which lasted into the next day. Bayern conducted her first full-power speed test on 25 April off the island of Alsen; these trials continued until 2 May. After further examinations, the ship was deemed ready for service on 15 July, a month and a half too late for her to participate in the Battle of Jutland.

Bayern joined III Battle Squadron of the High Seas Fleet upon her commissioning. The ship would have been available for the operation, but the ship's crew, composed largely of the crew from the recently decommissioned battleship Lothringen, was given leave. She had cost the Imperial German Government 49 million Goldmarks. Bayern was later joined in service by one sister ship, Baden. Two other ships of this class, Sachsen and Württemberg, were canceled before they were completed. At the time of her commissioning, Bayern's commander was Kapitän zur See (Captain at Sea) Max Hahn. Ernst Lindemann, who went on to command the battleship Bismarck during her only combat sortie in World War II, served aboard the ship as a wireless operator. On 25 May, Ludwig III of Bavaria, the last King of Bavaria, visited the ship. Bayern briefly served as the fleet flagship, from 7 to 16 August.

Admiral Reinhard Scheer planned a fleet advance for 18–19 August 1916; the operation consisted of a bombardment conducted by I Scouting Group. This was an attempt to draw out and destroy Admiral David Beatty's battlecruisers. As Moltke and Von der Tann were the only two German battlecruisers still in fighting condition, three dreadnoughts were assigned to the unit for the operation: Bayern and the two König-class ships Markgraf and Grosser Kurfürst. Admiral Scheer and the rest of the High Seas Fleet, including 15 dreadnoughts, were to trail behind and provide cover. The makeshift I Scouting Group conducted familiarization exercises on 15 August in preparation for the operation; Admiral Franz von Hipper was displeased by the slow speed of the battleships and Scheer ordered the unit not to exceed 20 nautical miles (37 km; 23 mi) from the main fleet so as to avoid being cut off by the faster British battlecruisers.

The Germans got underway late in the day on 18 August; the British were aware of the German plans and sortied the Grand Fleet to meet them. By 14:35 on 19 August, (Note: The times mentioned in this article are in CET, which is congruent with the German perspective. This is one hour ahead of UTC, the time zone commonly used in British works.) Scheer had been warned of the Grand Fleet's approach and, unwilling to engage the whole of the Grand Fleet just 11 weeks after the close call at Jutland, turned his forces around and retreated to German ports. Another sortie into the North Sea followed on 18–20 October, and the German fleet again encountered no British naval forces. The High Seas Fleet was reorganized on 6 December, and Bayern was stationed in the second position of III Squadron, since she was not outfitted to serve as a squadron flagship. Her placement as the second vessel in the line nevertheless would have allowed her to bring her greater firepower into action as quickly as possible.

=== Operation Albion ===
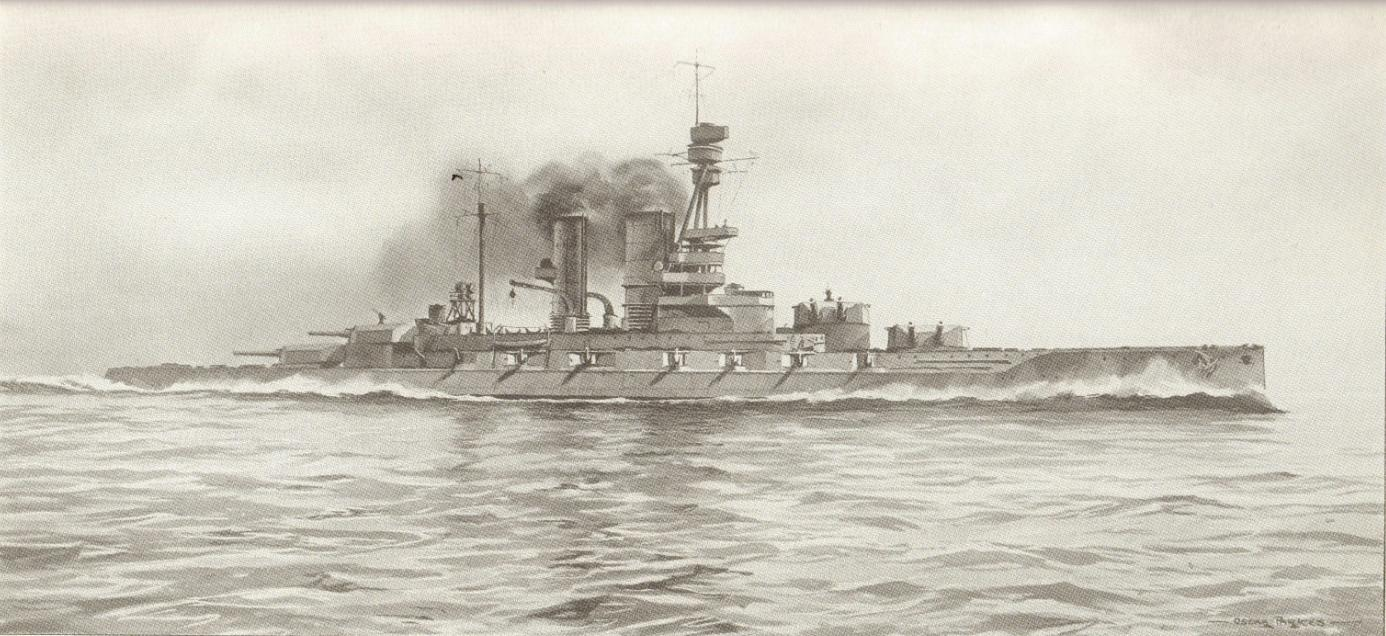
Recognition drawing of Bayern

In early September 1917, following the German conquest of the Russian port of Riga, the German navy decided to evict the Russian naval forces that still held the Gulf of Riga. To this end, the Admiralstab (the Navy High Command) planned an operation to seize the Baltic islands of Ösel, particularly the Russian gun batteries on the Sworbe peninsula. On 18 September, the order was issued for a joint Army-Navy operation to capture Ösel and Moon islands; the primary naval component consisted of the flagship Moltke and III Battle Squadron of the High Seas Fleet. At this time, V Division included the Bayern and four König-class battleships. VI Division consisted of the five Kaiser-class battleships. Along with 9 light cruisers, 3 torpedo boat flotillas, and dozens of mine warfare ships, the entire force numbered some 300 ships, supported by over 100 aircraft and 6 zeppelins. The invasion force amounted to approximately 24,600 officers and enlisted men. Opposing the Germans were the old Russian pre-dreadnoughts Slava and Tsesarevich, the armored cruisers Bayan, Admiral Makarov, and Diana, 26 destroyers, and several torpedo boats and gunboats. The garrison on Ösel numbered some 14,000 men.

The operation began on 12 October, when Bayern, along with Moltke and the four Königs, began firing on the Russian shore batteries at Tagga Bay. Simultaneously, the five Kaisers engaged the batteries on the Sworbe peninsula; the objective was to secure the channel between Moon and Dagö islands, thus blocking the only escape route of the Russian ships in the gulf. Bayern's role in the operation was cut short when she struck a naval mine at 5:07 while moving into her bombardment position at Pamerort. The mine explosion killed one Unteroffizier and six sailors, allowed 1,000 metric tons (980 long tons; 1,100 short tons) of water into the ship and caused the forecastle to sink by 2 m (6.6 ft). Despite the damage inflicted by the mine, Bayern engaged the naval battery at Cape Toffri on the southern tip of Hiiumaa. Bayern was released from her position at 14:00. Preliminary repairs were made on 13 October in Tagga Bay. The temporary repairs proved ineffective, and Bayern had to be withdrawn to Kiel for repairs; the return trip took 19 days. Repairs lasted from 3 November to 27 December, during which the forward torpedo tube room was stripped of its equipment and the torpedo ports were sealed. The room was then turned into an additional watertight compartment. Four 8.8 cm (3.5 in) SK L/30 anti-aircraft guns were also installed during the repairs.

On 16 October, two König-class battleships and several smaller vessels were sent to engage the Russian battleships in the Gulf of Riga. The following day, König and Kronprinz engaged the Russian battleships—König dueled with Slava and Kronprinz fired on both Slava and the cruiser Bayan. The Russian vessels were hit dozens of times, until at 10:30 the Russian naval commander, Admiral Bakhirev, ordered their withdrawal. Slava had taken too much damage, and was unable to escape; instead, she was scuttled and her crew was evacuated on a destroyer. By 20 October, the naval operations were effectively over; the Russian fleet had been destroyed or forced to withdraw, and the German army held the islands in the gulf.

=== Subsequent operations ===
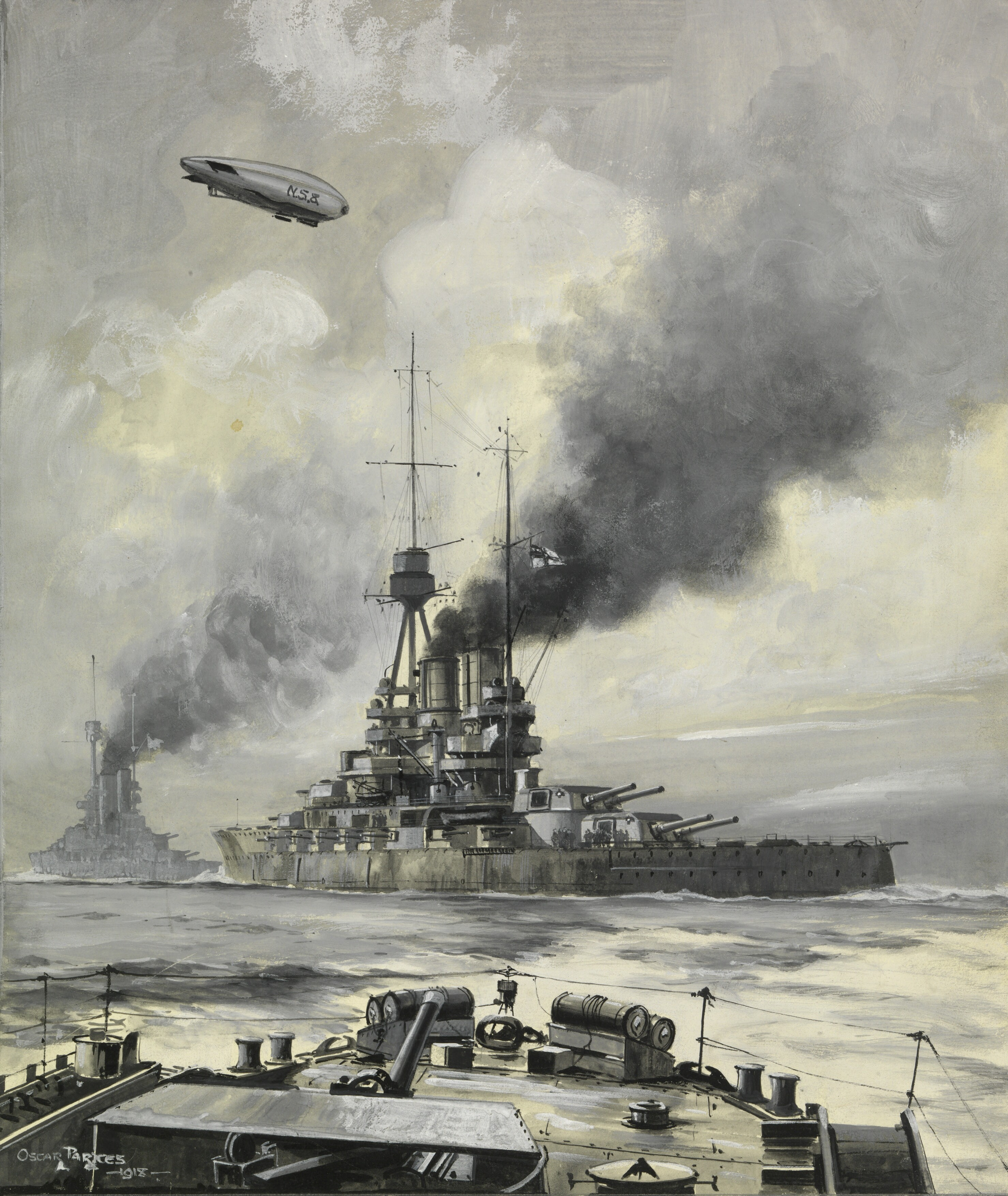
Illustration of Bayern steaming into Scapa Flow

Following her return to the fleet, Bayern was assigned to security duties in the North Sea. Admiral Scheer had used light surface forces to attack British convoys to Norway beginning in late 1917. As a result, the Royal Navy attached a squadron of battleships to protect the convoys, which presented Scheer with the possibility of destroying a detached squadron of the Grand Fleet. Scheer remarked that "A successful attack on such a convoy would not only result in the sinking of much tonnage, but would be a great military success, and would ... force the English to send more warships to the northern waters." Scheer instituted strict wireless silence in preparation for the planned attack. This denied the British the ability to intercept and decrypt German signals, which had previously been a significant advantage. The operation called for Hipper's battlecruisers to attack the convoy and its escorts on 23 April while the battleships of the High Seas Fleet stood by in support.

On 22 April, Bayern and the rest of the German fleet assembled in the Schillig Roads outside Wilhelmshaven and departed the following morning at 06:00. Heavy fog forced the Germans to remain inside their defensive minefields for half an hour. Hipper's forces were 60 nmi (110 km; 69 mi) west of Egerö, Norway, by 05:20 on 24 April. Despite the success in reaching the convoy route undetected, the operation failed due to faulty intelligence. Reports from U-boats indicated to Scheer that the convoys sailed at the start and middle of each week, but a west-bound convoy had left Bergen on Tuesday the 22nd and an east-bound group left Methil, Scotland, on the 24th, a Thursday. As a result, there was no convoy for Hipper to attack.

The same day, one of Moltke's screws slipped off, which caused serious damage to the power plant and allowed 2,000 metric tons (2,000 long tons; 2,200 short tons) of water into the ship. Moltke was forced to break radio silence in order to inform Scheer of the ship's condition, which alerted the Royal Navy to the High Seas Fleet's activities. Beatty sortied with a force of 31 battleships and four battlecruisers, but was too late to intercept the retreating Germans. The Germans reached their defensive minefields early on 25 April, though approximately 40 nmi (74 km; 46 mi) off Helgoland Moltke was torpedoed by the submarine E42. Moltke nevertheless successfully returned to port.

=== Fate ===
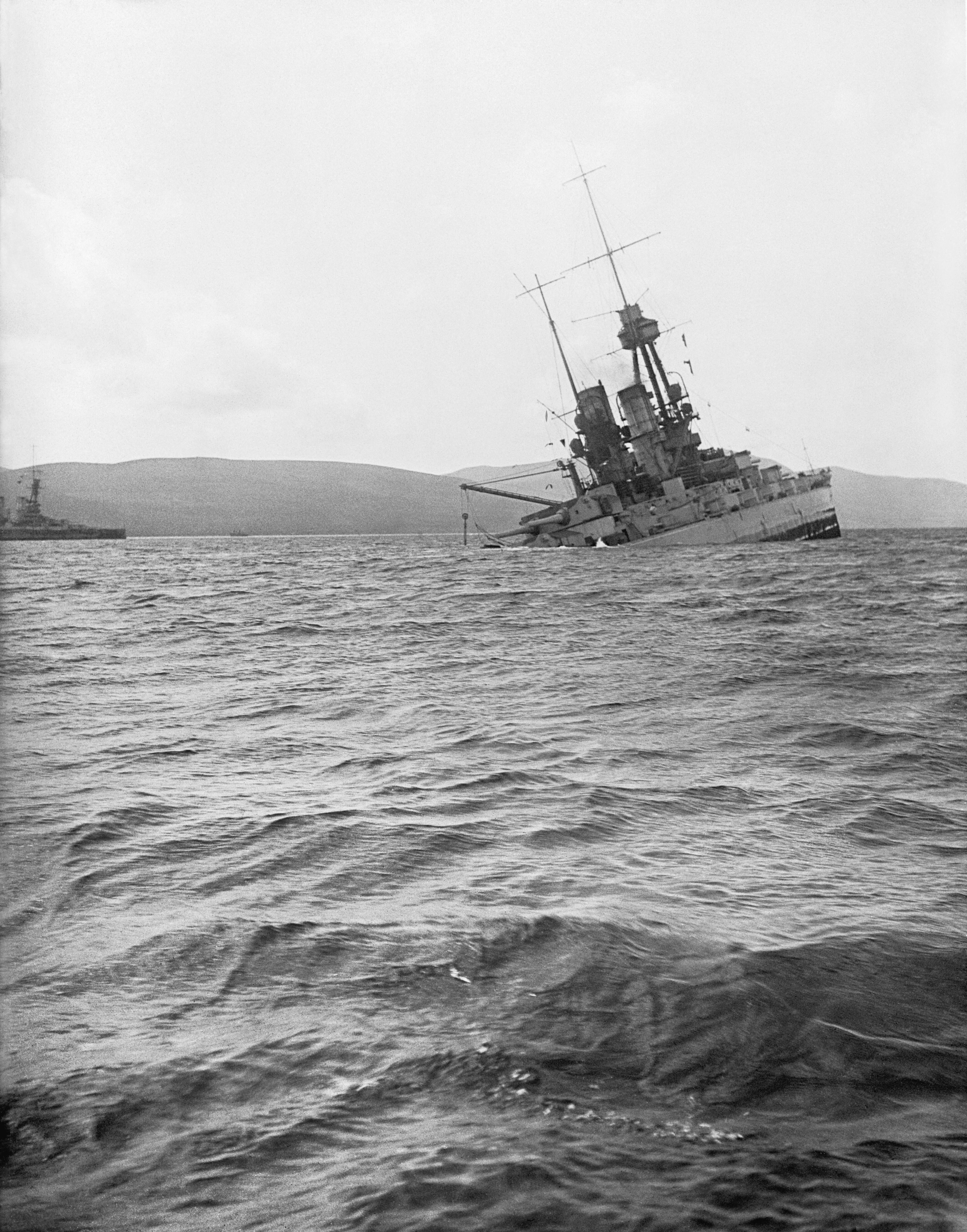
Bayern sinking at Scapa Flow

From 23 September to early October, Bayern served as the flagship of III Squadron, under Vizeadmiral (Vice Admiral) Hugo Kraft. Bayern was to have taken part in what would have amounted to the "death ride" of the High Seas Fleet shortly before the end of World War I. The bulk of the High Seas Fleet was to have sortied from its base in Wilhelmshaven to engage the British Grand Fleet. Scheer—by now the Großadmiral of the fleet—intended to inflict as much damage as possible on the British navy, in order to obtain a better bargaining position for Germany, whatever the cost to the fleet.

While the fleet was consolidating in Wilhelmshaven, war-weary sailors began rioting. On 24 October 1918, the order was given to sail from Wilhelmshaven. Starting on the night of 29 October, sailors on several battleships mutinied; three ships from III Squadron refused to weigh anchor, and acts of sabotage were committed on board the battleships Thüringen and Helgoland. The order to sail was rescinded in the face of this open revolt. In an attempt to suppress the mutiny, the battleship squadrons were dispersed. Bayern, along with the rest of III Squadron, was sent to Kiel.

Following the capitulation of Germany in November 1918, the majority of the High Seas Fleet was to be interned in the Royal Navy base at Scapa Flow. Bayern was listed as one of the ships to be handed over. On 21 November 1918, the ships to be interned, under the command of Rear Admiral Ludwig von Reuter, sailed from their base in Germany for the last time. The fleet rendezvoused with the British light cruiser Cardiff, before meeting a flotilla of 370 British, American, and French warships for the voyage to Scapa Flow.

The fleet remained in captivity during the negotiations that ultimately produced the Versailles Treaty. Reuter believed that the British intended to seize the German ships on 21 June, which was the deadline for Germany to have signed the peace treaty. Unaware that the deadline had been extended to the 23rd, Reuter ordered his ships to be sunk. On the morning of 21 June, the British fleet left Scapa Flow to conduct training maneuvers; at 11:20 Reuter transmitted the order to his ships. Bayern sank at 14:30. The ship was raised on 1 September 1934 and was broken up the following year in Rosyth. The ship's bell was eventually delivered to the German Federal Navy and was on display at Kiel Fördeklub as of 1990. (Note: It is unknown when the bell was returned, but it is likely that it was sometime between the late 1950s and mid 1960s. The British government returned the bell from SMS Hindenburg on 28 May 1959 and the bells from SMS Derfflinger and SMS Friedrich der Grosse on 30 August 1965. See: Gröner, pp. 26, 57.) Some parts of the ship, including her main battery gun turrets, remain on the sea floor between 38 and 45 m (125 and 148 ft), where they can be accessed by scuba divers.
