= Ernst Heinrich Lindemann =

German politician

Mayor of Düsseldorf
- In office September 1886 – June 1899

Mayor of Dortmund
- In office 1878–1886

Mayor of Essen
- In office 21 March 1859 – 1 September 1868

Personal details
- Born: 25 January 1833 Kirchlengern
- Died: 8 May 1900 (aged 67) Düsseldorf
- Relations: Ernst Lindemann (grandson)

Ernst Heinrich Lindemann (25 January 1833– 8 May 1900) was a German politician and mayor of Essen, Dortmund and Düsseldorf. His grandson Kapitän zur See Ernst Lindemann was the commander of the battleship Bismarck in World War II.

Lindemann was the son of the Theologian Heinrich Lindemann (1805–1861) who was the pastor of Kirchlegern since 1832. Lindemann studied law at the universities in Bonn, Heidelberg and Berlin from 1851 to 1854. He was elected mayor of Essen in December 1858. He held this office nine years from 1859 to 1868. He resigned from office and worked as a bank director of the Westdeutschen Versicherungs-Aktienbank and then as general director of the Bochumer Verein für Bergbau und Gußstahlfabrikation (BVG), an iron factory, belonging to Friedrich Grillo.

The father of three sons and two daughters died on 8 May 1900. His oldest son, Georg Heinrich Ernst Lindemann, was the father of the Captain of the battleship Bismarck, Otto Ernst Lindemann.

Government offices
Preceded by Johann Heinrich Horstmann	Mayor of Essen; 21 March 1859 – 1 September 1868	Succeeded by Albert Theodor Gustav Hache
Preceded by Richard Prüfer	Mayor of Dortmund; 1878–1886	Succeeded by Karl Wilhelm Schmieding
Preceded by Friedrich Wilhelm Becker	Mayor of Düsseldorf; September 1886 – June 1899	Succeeded by Wilhelm Marx
