= Peter Schwarber =

Mayor of Strasbourg who opposed the massacre of the jews in 1349

Peter Schwarber was a bourgeois and Alsatian politician, Ammeister (equivalent to mayor) of the Free Imperial City of Strasbourg, then an independent city-state under the protection of the Holy Roman Empire, at the time of the events leading up to the Strasbourg massacre on February 14, 1349, which he opposed unsuccessfully.

In remembrance of his willingness to protect the Jews and their legal status within the city of Strasbourg, a street has been named after him in the symbolic vicinity of the European Court of Human Rights, which notably hosts the European School of Strasbourg.

== Opposition to the Strasbourg massacre ==
Starting from January 1348, the Black Death diffused from southern France to reach Switzerland and Alsace in early 1349. In cities like Basel or Bern, Jews were being accused of poisoning water sources, the alleged cause of the spreading disease. A series of pogroms ensued in the course of January 1349, notably in Basel, Obernai, Colmar or Sélestat.

The mayor of Strasbourg, Peter Schwarber, did not believe the Jews to be responsible for the spread of the Black Death. Instead, he believed physical contact to be a likely factor behind the spread of the disease (which led him to temporarily prohibit access to some public spaces). He also argued that security letters has been delivered to the Jews against payment, so that their legal status within the city had to be respected. Facing increasing popular pressure, notably on the part of a number of professional corporations such as that of butchers, who had contracted important loans with Jewish bankers, he mobilized the city's guard to protect the Jewish community and elevated fences around its neighborhood.

On February 10, 1349, following rumors that Peter Schwarber and his administration had been paid by the Jews, the bourgeoisie and professional corporations of the city overturned Schwarber's government. On February 13, Schwarber was banished from Strasbourg and his belongings were seized. On the following day, the Jewish neighborhood was looted by the population, and debt acknowledgements, loans, and mortgages documents were destroyed. It is estimated that about 2,000 Jews were made prisoners on that occasion, many of whom were burnt to death in a massive pogrom remembered as the Strasbourg massacre.
