= Müllenheim =

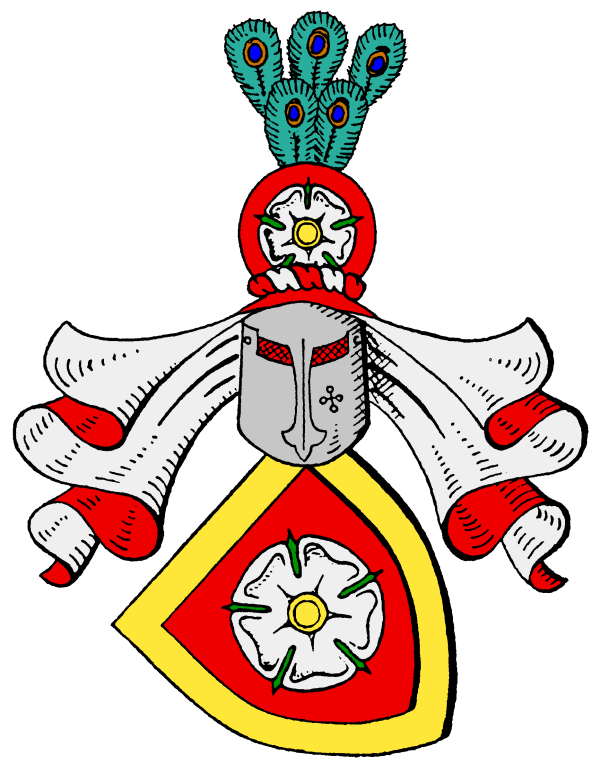
The Müllenheim coat of arms (Rechberg line)

The Müllenheim family (international Muellenheim, French Mullenheim, wrongly Mühlenheim) was an old noble family Strasbourg. The noblemen, knights or Freiherren of Müllenheim belonged to the Alsatian old nobility. The family, which is still thriving today, can be divided into five existing main branches, all of which descend from the "Heinrich Line" or the "Müllenheim zu Rechberg". On the one hand, there are the Catholic "Barons de Mullenheim", who received the French title of nobility in 1773, and the Protestant branches, including the "Freiherrn von Müllenheim-Rechberg", which were elevated to Prussian rank in 1886, plus the untitled branches of the "Müllenheim", whose common ancestors dropped the nobility title "von" in the 18th century, probably for pietistic reasons. These three Silesian branches can in turn be subdivided into those that are now based in the Rhineland or around Brunswick, and those incorrectly written as "Mühlenheim".

The family is first mentioned through Berthold von Mülnheim in 1108. The unbroken family line begins in 1225 with Johann von Mülenheim, the bishop's wine oath in Strasbourg. Walther von Müllenheim, a knight from 1290, was bailiff of the bishop of Strasbourg. Members of the family became part of the upper strata of the free imperial city.

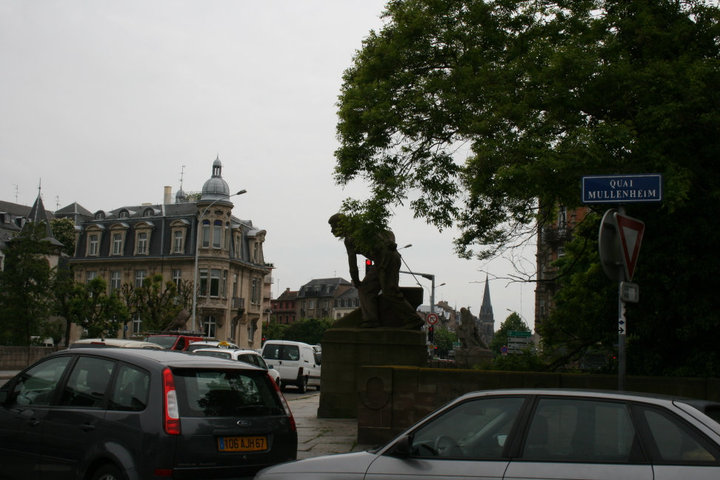
The Quai Müllenheim in Strasbourg

The Müllenheim and the Zorn families were the most important Strasbourg dynasties, and their rivalries over power in the city resulted in several street fights. Thus the town hall, for example, received two entrances, one for the Müllenheims and one for the Zorns. The city councillor Hermann von Müllenheim later pushed through a measure to name the two banks of the Northern Strasbourg island in the river Ill the Quai Müllenheim and the Quai Zorn. The high point of the rivalry was the battle on 20 May 1332, and as a consequence the nobles were thrown from power in the city, since the guilds were actual winners of this fight.

The family had three main lines around 1300: the Johannes line, which was extinguished with Philip Andreas von Müllenheim-Rosenburg in 1684, the Heinrich line and the Burkhard line, which died out in the 15th century. From these lines, about 40 different members were elected between 1300 and 1760 to be Stettmeister of Strasbourg (noble members of the city authorities).

The history of the town of Illkirch-Graffenstaden is closely connected with the Müllenheims. When Rudolf of Habsburg became Holy Roman Emperor, he granted in 1284 to his confidant Bernhard von Müllenheim the ford of "Gravenstaden vor der Hate" with the right to levy tolls there. As there was no bridge in Grafenstaden, one could only cross the river via this ford, which the residents of Strasbourg had done until then for free; in 1391 this ford reverted to Strasbourg's ownership. Later Maria Esther von Müllenheim's husband, the Strasbourg Stettmeister Hans Georg von Zedlitz, tried in 1681 to get the Empire's help to stave off the threatened capture of the city by soldiers of Louis XIV of France, under Joseph de Montclar. As no such help was forthcoming, he was forced to sign the treaty of capitulation of Illkirch on 30 September 1681, in order to prevent further suffering.

Several members of the Müllenheim family in and around Strasbourg have also been knighted (since the early 14th century), and later belonged to the Imperial Knights of the Lower Alsace and Ortenau. One branch of the Heinrich line settled in the early 17th century in Poland (or East Prussia). Gebhard von Müllenheim auf Puschkeiten was in 1635 appointed a Polish royal chamberlain and a Starosta. The Müllenheim-Rechberg line received permission from Prussia in 1886, 1900, 1902 and 1904 to use the title of Freiherr.

== Notable members ==
- Burkard Freiherr von Müllenheim-Rechberg (1910–2003), German diplomat, Kapitänleutnant zur See and author
- Hermann Freiherr von Müllenheim (1845–1903), German historian
- Franz Jakob Ferdinand Freiherr von Müllenheim (1746–1814), hunt master of the bishopric of Strasbourg and member of the Alsatian provincial assembly
- Gebhard von Müllenheim auf Puschkeiten (died around 1635), Polish royal chamberlain and Starosta
