= Burkard Freiherr von Müllenheim-Rechberg =

German diplomat and author

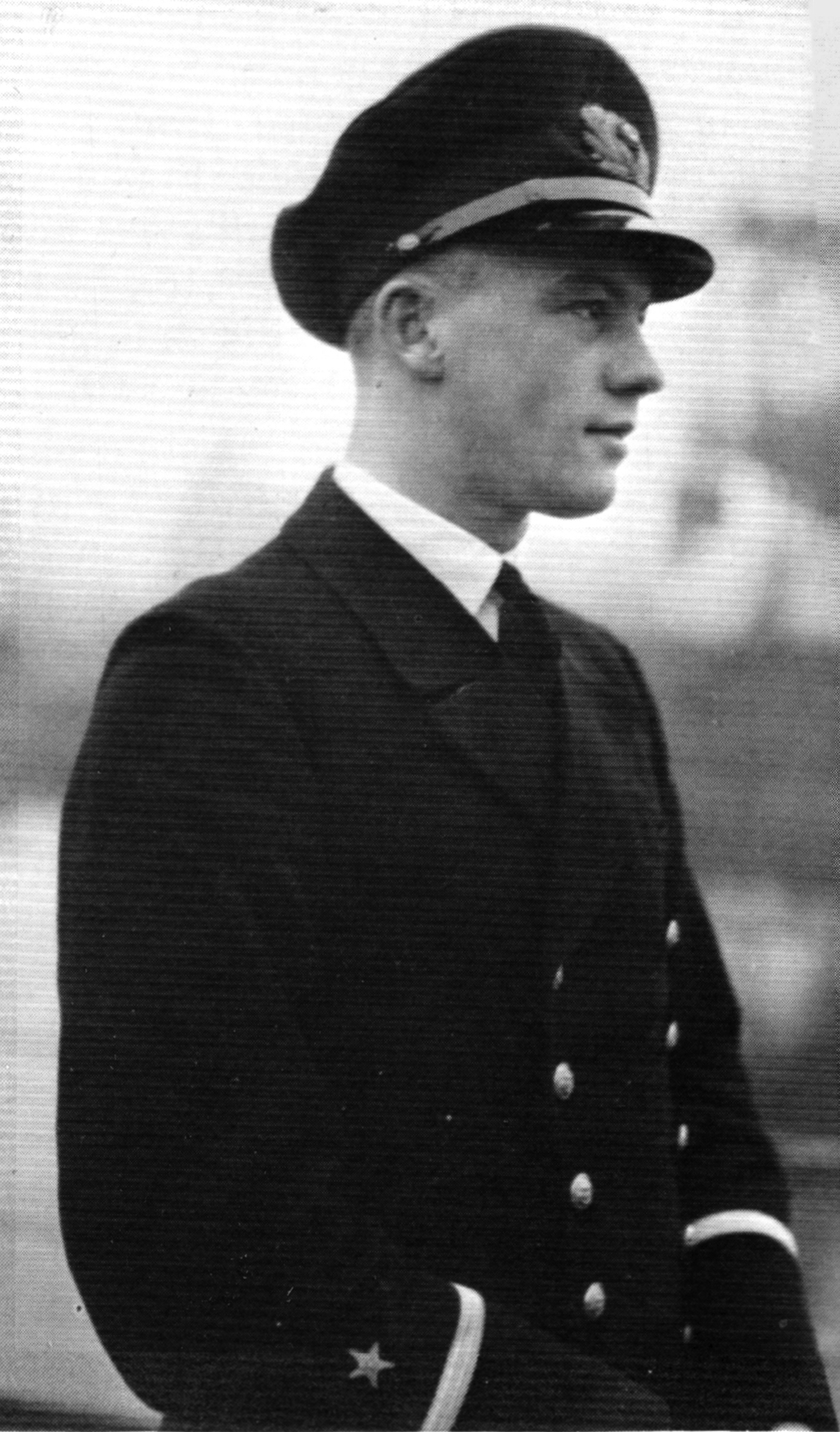
- von Müllenheim-Rechberg as a sub-lieutenant in 1934

West German ambassador to the Democratic Republic of the Congo
- In office 1965–1967

West German ambassador to Tanzania
- In office 1971–1975

Personal details
- Born: Richard Alexander Conrad Bernhard Burkard von Müllenheim-Rechberg; 25 June 1910 Spandau, German Empire
- Died: 1 June 2003 (aged 92) Herrsching am Ammersee, Germany

Richard Alexander Conrad Bernhard Burkard Freiherr von Müllenheim-Rechberg (Spandau, 25 June 1910 — Herrsching am Ammersee, 1 June 2003) was a German diplomat and author. After his career as a naval officer in the Kriegsmarine, he entered the diplomatic career of the Federal Republic of Germany. He was the highest-ranking survivor of the battleship Bismarck.

== Early life ==
Burkard Freiherr von Müllenheim-Rechberg was a member of the Müllenheim family, an old Protestant family which originated from Alsace. After receiving his Abitur in 1929, he entered the Reichsmarine, the Weimar navy. He became an aide to the German military attaché in London.

== Second World War ==
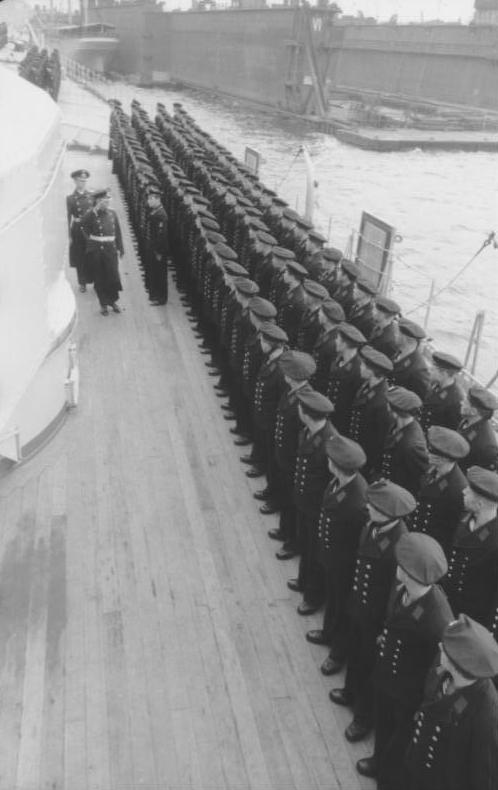
von Müllenheim-Rechberg behind captain Ernst Lindemann inspecting troops aboard the battleship Bismarck.

At the outbreak of the Second World War, von Müllenheim-Rechberg served on several vessels. In May 1941, he experienced the sinking of the battleship Bismarck as fourth artillery officer with the rank of lieutenant commander, thereby becoming the highest-ranking survivor of the ship. He was rescued by the British cruiser Dorsetshire and, after initial detention in England, was transported to Canada to the Bowmanville POW camp in Bowmanville, Ontario, from early April 1942 until it closed in April 1945. He was later brought back to England in spring 1946 in preparation for repatriation. On 1 February 1943, he was promoted to the rank of commander.

== Diplomatic career ==
From 1947 to 1949, von Müllenheim-Rechberg studied at the University of Frankfurt. In 1949, he passed the state examination in jurisprudence. In 1952, he entered the diplomatic service of the Federal Foreign Office. He was a member of the West German NATO delegation in Paris in 1955 and participated at the NATO conference in Bonn in 1956.

In 1965, he became the West German ambassador to the Democratic Republic of the Congo during the tenure of Moïse Tshombe as a prime minister. von Müllenheim-Rechberg would later write a book about Tshombe's kidnapping by Francis Bodenan in 1967 and his death during his imprisonment in Algeria in 1969.

He continued his diplomatic career as a consul general in Toronto in 1968. That same year, he received the Grand Cross 1st Class of the Federal Republic of Germany. He ended his diplomatic career as his country's ambassador to Tanzania from 1971 to 1975.

== Publications ==
- Baron von Müllenheim-Rechberg, Burkard (2001). The Abduction and Death of Moïse Tshombe: The End of a Hope for the Congo. WorldView Publications. ISBN 978-1872142456.
- Freiherr von Müllenheim-Rechberg, Burkard (1998). Entführung und Tod des Moïse Tshombe: Das Ende einer Hoffnung für den Kongo. LIT. ISBN 3-8258-3940-0.
- Baron von Müllenheim-Rechberg, Burkard (1990). Battleship Bismarck: A Survivor's Story. Naval Institute Press. ISBN 1557504369.
