= High Seas Fleet Badge =

High Seas Fleet Badge Das Flottenkriegsabzeichen
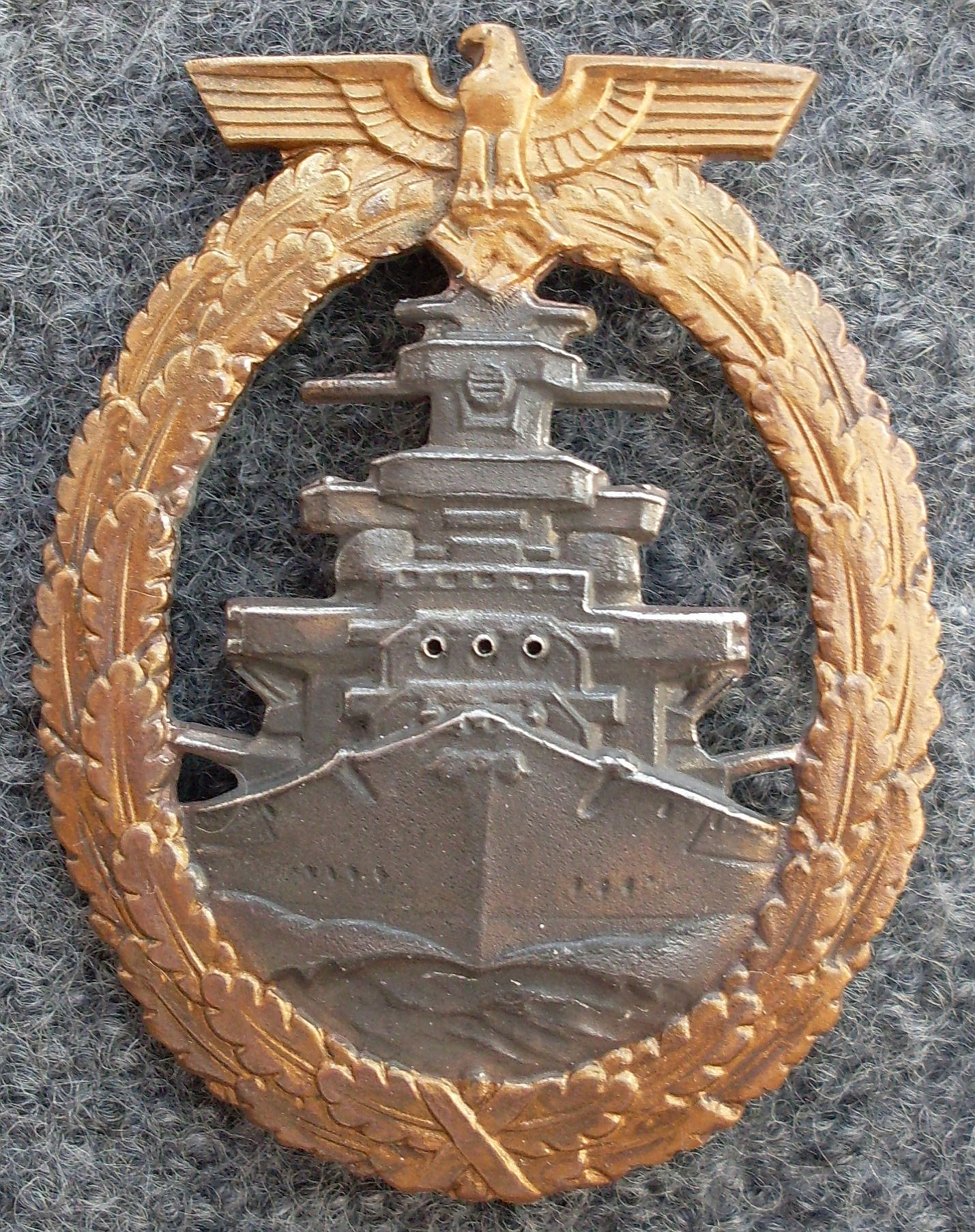
- design by Wilhelm Ernst Peekhaus
- Type: Badge
- Awarded for: Service in the Kriegsmarine High Seas Fleet
- Presented by: Nazi Germany
- Eligibility: Military personnel
- Campaign: World War II
- Status: Obsolete
- Established: April 1941

The High Seas Fleet Badge (German: Das Flottenkriegsabzeichen), also known as High Seas Fleet War Badge, was a World War II German military decoration awarded for service to the crews of the Kriegsmarine High Seas Fleet, mainly of the battleships and cruisers, but also those ships that supported them operationally for which there was no other award given. Although the award was instituted in April 1941, it could be awarded for actions that took place prior to this date. It was "primarily in recognition of the sea struggle" against the British fleet.

== Description ==
The medal had an outer gold laurel wreath of oak leaves with the German Eagle at the top, while clutching a swastika. In the center was a "forward sailing battleship" in grey. The badge was worn on the lower part of the left breast pocket of the naval service tunic, underneath the 1st class Iron Cross, if awarded.

== Criteria for award ==
To be eligible to receive the badge one must have 12 weeks service on a battleship or cruiser, with proof of distinction and good conduct. The number of weeks were reduced if one of these conditions were met:

- If the recipient was wounded or killed during the voyage.
- Outstanding achievements in a naval engagement.
- Individual's ship was sunk in action. (Bismarck, Admiral Graf Spee, Blücher)
- For participation in the sinking of HMS Rawalpindi by Scharnhorst and Gneisenau and the sinking of two merchant vessels south of Jan Mayen by Deutschland.
- All crew members of the Scharnhorst and Gneisenau received the award in view of the operational effectiveness of the ships.
- To every sailor who was present on the Tirpitz when it was bombed and sunk by the British R.A.F. in Tromsø Fjord on 12 November 1944.
