= Tagalaht =

Bay in Saare County, Estonia

- Tagga Bay, Taggaviken
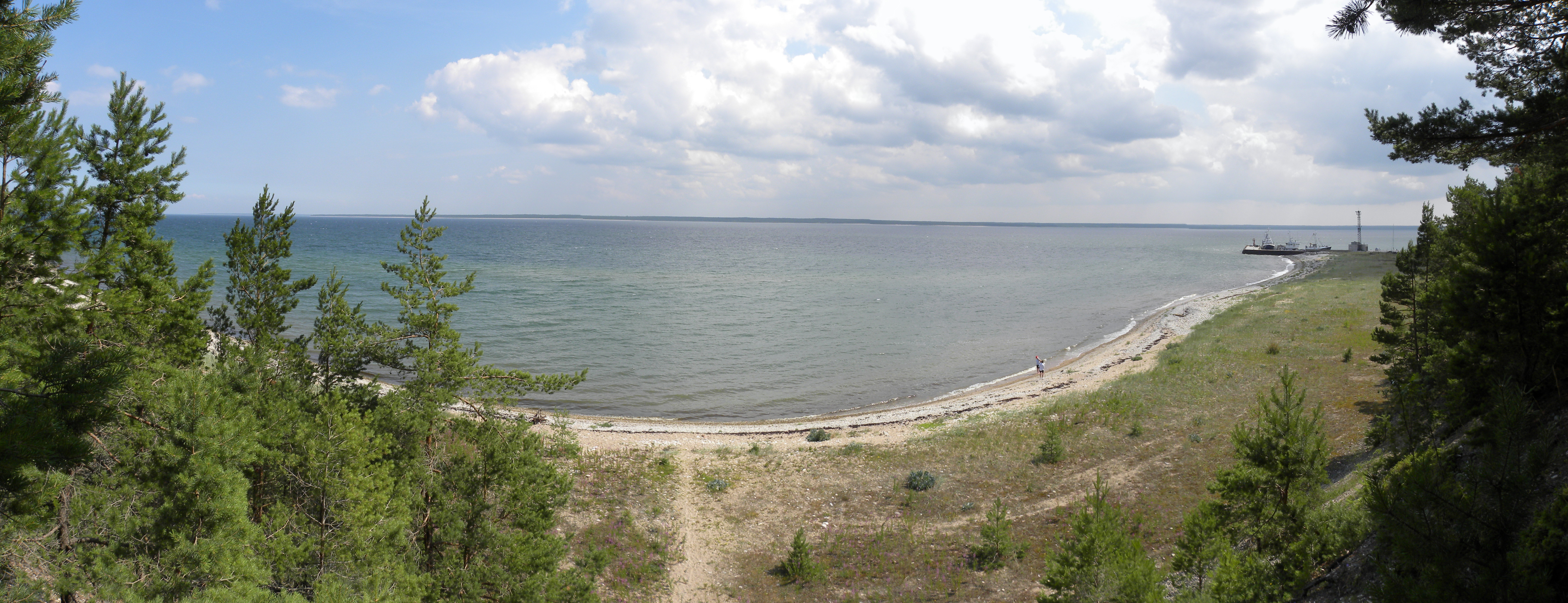
- Tagalaht Bay Panorama

- Tagga Bay marked on a relief image of Estonia
- Location: Saare County, Estonia
- Coordinates: 58°31′N 22°4′E
- Type: Bay
- Part of: Baltic Sea

Tagalaht (Swedish: Taggaviken) is a bay in the Baltic Sea, on the north-west coast of Saaremaa Island in Estonia, situated between the Tagamõisa Peninsula (German: Hundsort) and Ninase (Cape Ninnast). During World War I, the bay, guarded by Russian beach forts at Hundsort and Ninnast, was the main landing point for German troops during Operation Albion in October 1917, when Saaremaa was occupied.
