= König-class battleship =

Battleship class of the German Imperial Navy

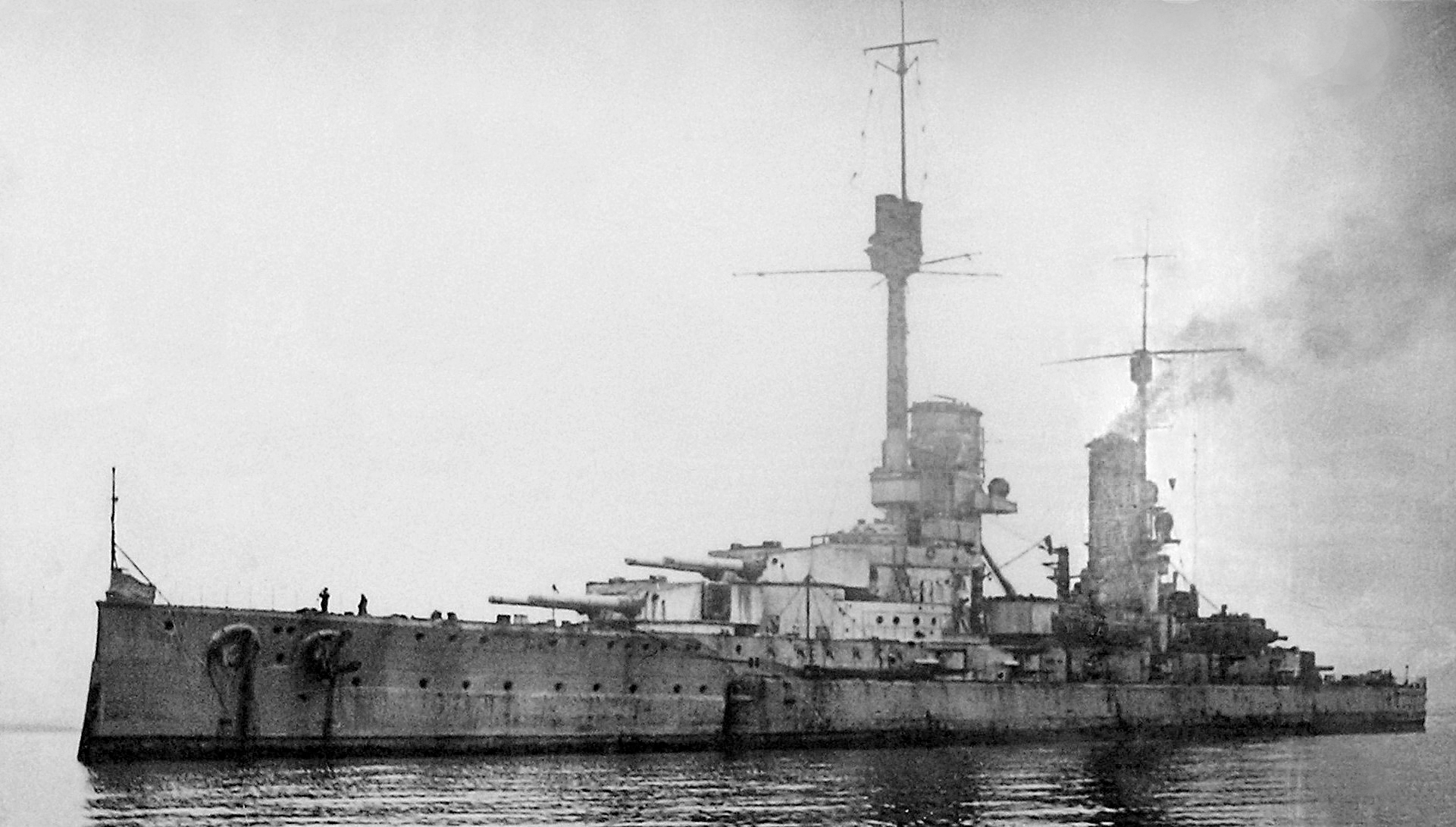
- Kronprinz Wilhelm in Scapa Flow, 1919

Class overview
- Builders: AG Vulcan Stettin (1); AG Weser (1); Friedrich Krupp Germaniawerft (1); Kaiserliche Werft Wilhelmshaven (1)
- Operators: Imperial German Navy
- Preceded by: Kaiser class
- Succeeded by: Bayern class
- Built: 1911–1914
- In commission: 1914–1919
- Completed: 4
- Lost: 3
- Scrapped: 1

General characteristics
- Type: Dreadnought battleship
- Displacement: Normal: 25,796 t (25,389 long tons); Full load: 28,600 t (28,100 long tons)
- Length: 175.4 m (575 ft 6 in) lwl
- Beam: 29.5 m (96 ft 9 in)
- Draft: 9.19 m (30 ft 2 in)
- Installed power: 3 × oil-fired water-tube boilers; 12 × coal-fired water-tube boilers; 31,000 shp (31,000 PS)
- Propulsion: 3 × steam turbines; 3 × screw propellers
- Speed: 21 knots (39 km/h; 24 mph)
- Range: 8,000 nmi (15,000 km; 9,200 mi) at 12 knots (22 km/h; 14 mph)
- Complement: 41 officers; 1,095 enlisted men
- Armament: 10 × 30.5 cm (12 in) guns; 14 × 15 cm (5.9 in) guns; 6 × 8.8 cm (3.5 in) guns; 4 × 8.8 cm anti-aircraft guns; 5 × 50 cm (19.7 in) torpedo tubes
- Armor: Belt: 12 to 35 cm (4.7 to 13.8 in); Deck: 6 to 10 cm (2.4 to 3.9 in); Conning tower: 30 cm (11.8 in); Turrets: 30 cm; Casemates: 15 cm

The König class was a group of four dreadnought battleships built for the German Kaiserliche Marine (Imperial Navy) in the early 1910s. The class comprised König, the lead ship, Grosser Kurfürst, Markgraf, and Kronprinz. The design for the ships was derived from the preceding Kaiser class, using the same basic hull but with the main battery of ten 30.5 cm (12 in) guns in five twin-gun turrets rearranged to improve the guns' firing arcs. Instead of the staggered wing turrets used in the Kaisers, the Königs placed their main guns all on the centerline using superfiring pairs fore and aft. Budgetary constraints and the need to begin construction quickly to compete with Britain in the Anglo-German naval arms race prevented any more radical changes. Diesel engines were planned for the ships, but they could not be readied in time, so all four vessels reverted to steam turbines for their propulsion system.

As tensions in Europe spiraled out of control during the July Crisis in 1914, work on the ships was accelerated; all four ships were completed in the early months of World War I and they were rushed into service to join III Battle Squadron of the High Seas Fleet. They took part in a number of operations in the North Sea as support for the battlecruisers of I Scouting Group, including the Raid on Yarmouth and the Raid on Scarborough, Hartlepool and Whitby in late 1914. The year 1915 passed uneventfully, as a series of sweeps into the North Sea failed to bring contact with elements of the British Royal Navy. All four ships were present at the Battle of Jutland on 31 May – 1 June 1916, where they formed the front of the German line of battle. As a result, they received numerous hits, with Kronprinz the only member of the class to avoid being damaged in the action.

As the German fleet shifted priorities to the U-boat campaign after Jutland, the surface fleet declined in significance, though major fleet elements were sent to the Baltic Sea in September 1917 to wage Operation Albion to secure several islands in the Gulf of Riga from Russian forces. König and Kronprinz took part in the Battle of Moon Sound there, where they damaged the Russian pre-dreadnought Slava and forced her scuttling. The four König-class ships saw little activity thereafter and plans for a final attack on the Royal Navy in October 1918 led to the Wilhelmshaven mutiny. All four ships were interned at Scapa Flow after the war, where they were scuttled on 21 June 1919. Grosser Kurfürst was raised in 1938 and broken up, but the other three vessels remain on the sea floor, where they remain popular diving sites.

== Background ==
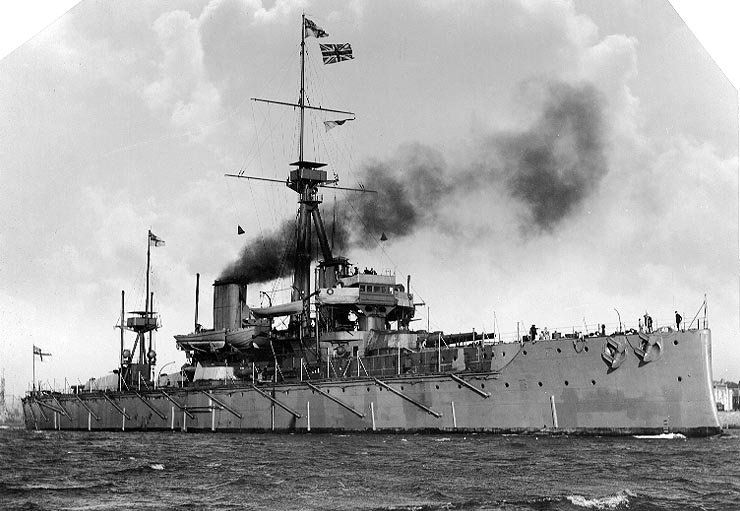
HMS Dreadnought spurred a major escalation of the Anglo-German naval arms race

The König-class battleships were authorized in the context of the early-20th-century Anglo-German naval arms race, under the Second Amendment to the Naval Law, which had been passed in 1908 as a response to the revolution in naval technology created with the launch of the British HMS Dreadnought in 1906. Many of the world's navies began building their own dreadnought battleships, which were significantly larger—and correspondingly more expensive—than the old pre-dreadnought battleships. The Germans began their own, the Nassau class, in 1907, followed by the Helgoland class in 1908. As a result, the funds that had been appropriated for the Navy in the First Amendment, passed in 1906, were going to be used up before they were scheduled to be replenished in 1911.

In the terms of the First Amendment to the Naval Law of 1906, Admiral Alfred von Tirpitz had requested but failed to secure funding for new battleships; they had now been approved by the Reichstag under the 1908 amendment. Along with appropriating funds to continue the pace of battleship construction prescribed under the Naval Law, the new amendment also increased the naval budget by an additional 1 billion marks. Tirpitz had initially planned on building four new capital ships per year, including battlecruisers, but the increased cost of the new ships forced him to reduce the number of ships laid down per year to two beginning in the 1912 fiscal year and continuing through 1917.

Another effect of the 1908 amendment was to reduce the service life of all large warships from twenty-five years to twenty; this was done in an effort to force the Reichstag to allocate more funds for additional ships, since vessels would then need to be replaced sooner than originally planned. In his effort to force the Reichstag to pass the bill, Tirpitz threatened to resign from his post as the State Secretary for the Navy. As a result of Tirpitz's ultimatum, the bill was passed in March 1908 by a large margin. The reduction in service life necessitated the replacement of the coastal defense ships of the Siegfried and Odin classes as well as the Brandenburg-class battleships. The Kaiser class followed the Helgolands and replaced the remaining coastal defense ships, leaving the Brandenburgs as the next vessels to be replaced. The four König-class ships were ordered under the provisional names "S", Ersatz Kurfürst Friedrich Wilhelm, Ersatz Weissenburg, and Ersatz Brandenburg, the latter three as replacements for three of the four Brandenburgs. (Note: German warships were ordered under provisional names. Additions to the fleet were given a single letter; ships intended to replace older or lost vessels were ordered as "Ersatz (name of the ship to be replaced)".)

== Design ==
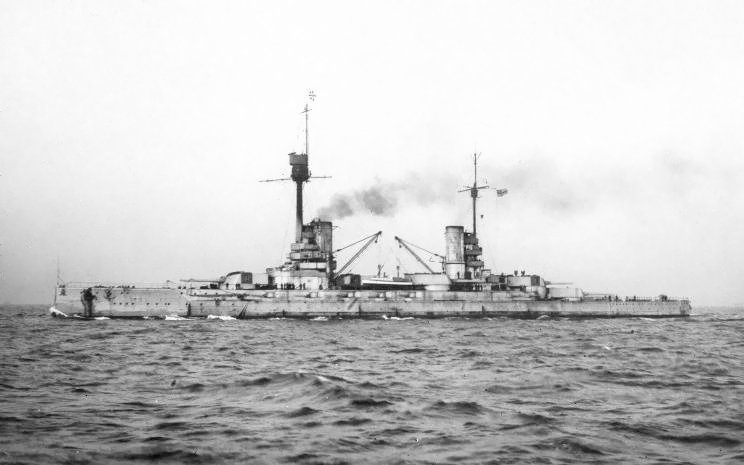
Friedrich der Grosse of the Kaiser class, which provided the starting point for the König design

Conceptual work for the next class of battleship had already begun while the design for the Kaiser class was still being finalized. During a meeting on 15 January 1910, Tirpitz mandated that the new class must adhere to the price per ship he had budgeted, owing to the financial problems that had already disrupted his plans. The Konstruktionsdepartement (Construction Department, referred to as "K") was as that time occupied with work on the new battlecruiser Seydlitz, delaying the initiation of formal planning for what became the König design. Nevertheless, the Allgemeinen Marinedepartements (General Navy Department, referred to as "A") began to make preparations in early 1910. Vizeadmiral (Vice Admiral) Adolf Paschen, the chief of "A", expressed a desire to rearrange the main battery guns to the centerline to maximize broadside fire, while Tirpitz reiterated his preference for diesel engines, though trials with the prototype engine for the center shaft of the Kaiser-class ship Prinzregent Luitpold were not yet completed.

During a series of three meetings in May 1910, further details were discussed, including adopting triple gun turrets for the main battery, following their adoption by the Austro-Hungarian Navy and other navies. They also examined the possibility of increasing the caliber of the guns to 32 cm (12.6 in) in response to the British adoption of 34.3 cm (13.5 in) weapons and the United States' increase to 35.6 cm (14 in) guns since 1909. Tirpitz again argued that at least one of the new ships should use a diesel engine. Hans Bürkner, the civilian "K" chief, preferred a simple development of Prinzregent Luitpold as that would entail minimal cost increases in accordance with Tirpitz's wishes. By the third meeting, the question of increasing the caliber was set aside as cost prohibitive; while the naval command believed that the existing 30.5 cm (12 in) gun was sufficiently powerful at the expected battle ranges, they recognized that in the future, an increase in caliber would be unavoidable if Germany was to keep up with developments abroad. Owing to the pressing need to match British construction and keep costs within Tirpitz's budgetary constraints, the naval command decided to simply repeat the design for Prinzregent Luitpold with some of the improvements.

The design staff used the Kaiser hull form, but introduced several improvements, the most significant being the re-arrangement of the main battery. The two wing turrets were both moved to the centerline, one superfiring over the forward-most turret, and the other amidships between the funnels. The armor layout was also revised slightly to improve protection of the bow and stern. To offset the weight increase of these changes, a pair of 15 cm (5.9 in) secondary guns and the stern torpedo tube were to be removed. "K" considered the adoption of anti-roll tanks to help stabilize the ships, as the recently completed Nassau-class battleships initially suffered from severe rolling, though Tirpitz eventually decided against them. By December 1910, the decision was made to retain all fourteen of the 15 cm guns and instead remove two of the 8.8 cm (3.5 in) guns. Although initially intended to use diesel engines on their center shafts, delays in the completion of the prototype for Prinzregent Luitpold forced the Navy to return to the traditional all-turbine arrangement for the first member of the class. Partial oil-firing was introduced, which provided greater power for the turbines.

Top: Kaiser class layout
Bottom: König class layout

The first three ships—König, Grosser Kurfürst, and Markgraf—were ordered for the 1911 program. Several shipyards, including AG Vulcan, AG Weser, and Schichau-Werke, submitted tenders to the Reichsmarineamt (Imperial Naval Office) to build the vessels by 19 July 1911. Vulcan and Weser received contracts on 11 August, though the finalized orders were not issued until 12 October; final tinkering with the design continued, however, and Tirpitz's decision to abandon the anti-roll tanks came as late as 22 January 1912. The contract for the third ship—actually the first member of the class, König—went to the Kaiserliche Werft (Imperial Shipyard), while Schichau received the contract for the battlecruiser Derfflinger as compensation. It was still hoped that the diesels could still be installed aboard Grosser Kurfürst and Markgraf, but it was still not ready by the time work began on the vessels.

A fourth ship was authorized under the 1912 program, and the naval command again considered increasing the caliber, this time to 32.3 cm (12.7 in). The increase in weight from the larger guns would be offset by reducing the secondary battery from 15 cm to 12 cm (4.7 in) guns. The proposal was ultimately rejected in favor of building another vessel identical to the 1911 ships to create a homogeneous four-ship division to simplify tactical command. The naval command again hoped that the diesel engine would be ready in time for this vessel, so her propulsion system was redesigned with larger, more powerful turbines than her sisters received. But before work began, it became clear that the diesel would not be ready, so the center engine room—which had been left empty in Prinzregent Luitpold—was reconfigured to accept a third turbine. Only one significant change was introduced for the new ship, which became Kronprinz, was a larger tubular foremast that was capable of supporting a heavier fire direction top. This was later retrofitted to the other members of the class.

=== General characteristics ===
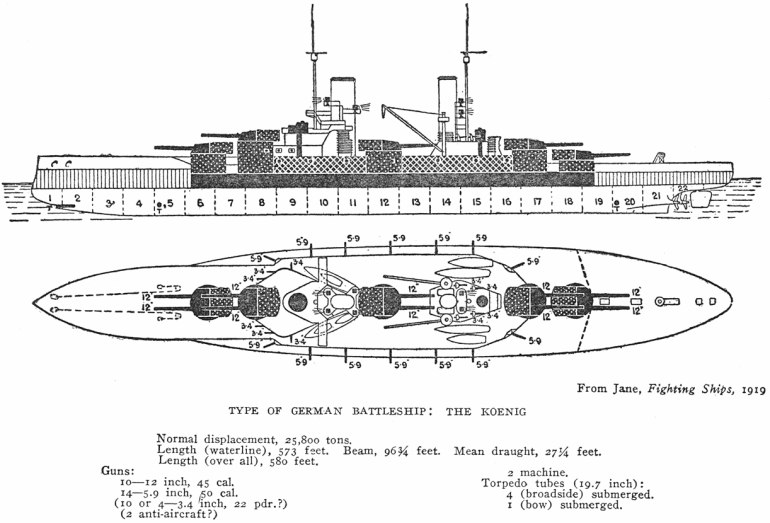
Plan and elevation view of a ship of the König class, from Jane's Fighting Ships 1919

The König-class ships were 174.7 m (573 ft 2 in) long at the waterline, and 175.4 m (575 ft 6 in) long overall. They had a beam of 29.5 m (96 ft 9 in), a forward draft of 9.19 m (30 ft 2 in), and a rear draft of 9 m (29 ft 6 in). As designed, the Königs displaced 25,796 t (25,389 long tons) normally, but at full load, they displaced 28,600 t (28,100 long tons). The hulls were constructed with transverse and longitudinal steel frames, over which the outer hull plates were riveted. The ships' hulls each contained eighteen watertight compartments and were equipped with a double bottom that ran for 88% of the length of the hull. A long forecastle deck ran from the stem to the aft superfiring barbette. The ships' superstructure was minimal, consisting of a set of forward and aft conning towers, though König was built as a squadron flagship and accordingly received a larger bridge to accommodate an admiral's staff. In 1917, Markgraf received an enlarged bridge similar to König's as well. The first three ships were fitted with a pair of pole masts to support their spotting tops, though Kronprinz received a heavier tubular mast.

Steering was controlled by a pair of rudders placed side by side. German naval historian Erich Gröner said the German navy considered the ships to be "very good sea-boats", and that they possessed a gentle motion. They suffered a slight loss of speed in a swell, and with the rudders hard over, the ships lost up to 66% speed and heeled over 8 degrees. The battleships had a transverse metacentric height of 2.59 m (8 ft 6 in). König, Grosser Kurfürst, Markgraf, and Kronprinz each had a standard crew of 41 officers and 1095 enlisted men; König, which became the flagship of III Battle Squadron, had an additional crew of 14 officers and another 68 sailors. While serving as a deputy command flagship, the ships carried an additional 2 officers and 24 enlisted men. The ships carried several smaller boats, including one picket boat, three admiral's barges, two launches, two yawls, and two dinghies.

=== Propulsion ===
The ships of the class were equipped with three sets of steam turbines, each set consisting of a high and low-pressure turbine. The turbines were manufactured by Parsons for König and Kronprinz, Vulcan AG for Grosser Kurfürst, and Bergmann for Markgraf. Each engine drove a three-bladed screw propeller that was 3.8 m (12 ft) in diameter. The high and low-pressure turbines were grouped into their own engine rooms. Steam for the turbines was provided by fifteen Schulz-Thornycroft water-tube boilers, three of which burned oil and the remainder burning coal. These were divided into three boiler rooms, the first two of which were placed between the forward and center ammunition magazines for the main battery, venting into the forward funnel. The third boiler room was located aft of the center magazine, directly ahead of the engine rooms, and venting into the smaller aft funnel. Electrical power was supplied by four turbo generators and a pair of diesel generators; total electrical output was 2,040 kW (2,740 hp) at 225 volts.

The power plant was rated at 31,000 metric horsepower (30,576 shp), for a top speed of 21 knots (39 km/h; 24 mph), though on trials, the ships produced between 41,400–46,200 metric horsepower (40,834–45,568 shp). Despite significantly surpassing their intended horsepower, König and Markgraf still managed only 21 knots on their speed trials, while Grosser Kurfürst and Kronprinz reached 21.2 knots (39.3 km/h; 24.4 mph) and 21.3 knots (39.4 km/h; 24.5 mph), respectively. This was a result of the fact that the tests were run after the start of World War I and thus had to be conducted in the safer, but shallower, waters of the western Baltic Sea. In service running under normal conditions, the Königs were faster than the Kaiser class, which averaged a top speed of 22.2 knots (41.1 km/h; 25.5 mph). Normal fuel storage amounted to 850 t (840 long tons) of coal and 150 t (150 long tons) of oil, though additional voids could be used to store up to 3,000 t (3,000 long tons) of coal and 600 t (590 long tons) of oil. The ships' cruising radius was 8,000 nautical miles (15,000 km; 9,200 mi) at a speed of 12 knots (22 km/h; 14 mph), which was halved when cruising at 18 knots (33 km/h; 21 mph).

=== Armament ===
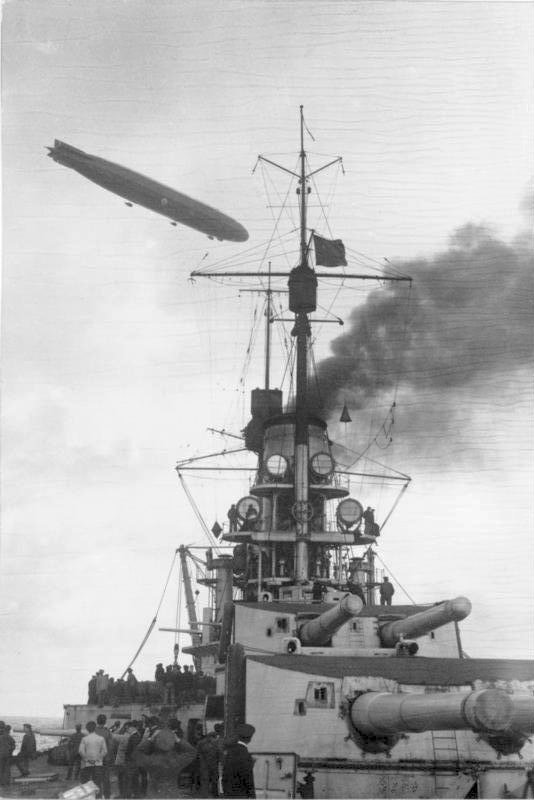
The rear turrets of Grosser Kurfürst

The Königs were armed with a main battery of ten 30.5 cm SK L/50 guns in five twin turrets. (Note: In Imperial German Navy gun nomenclature, "SK" (Schnelladekanone) denotes that the gun is quick loading, while the L/50 denotes the length of the gun. In this case, the L/50 gun is 50 calibers, meaning that the gun is 50 times as long as it is in bore diameter.) Two turrets were mounted forward of the main superstructure in a superfiring pair, the third was placed on the centerline between the two funnels amidships, and the fourth and fifth turrets were arranged in another superfiring pair aft of the rear conning tower. The centerline arrangement was an improvement over the preceding Kaiser class, as all ten guns could fire on a wide arc on the broadside, and four guns could fire directly ahead, as opposed to only two on the Kaisers. The guns were supplied with 90 shells per gun, and they had a rate of fire of about three shots per minute. The barrels had an expected life of two hundred full-power shots before they would need to be replaced.

The guns were mounted in C/11 turrets, which were electrically controlled, though the guns were elevated hydraulically. Each turret had a working chamber beneath it that was connected to a set of revolving ammunition hoists leading down to the magazine below it. One set of hoists retrieved the shells and propellant charges from the magazines and brought them to the working chamber, and another transferred them up to the gun house through flash-tight doors; this arrangement was adopted to reduce the risk of fire in the gun house from reaching the magazines. In an effort to reduce the possibility of a fire, everything in the turret was constructed of steel. The guns had a range of elevation from -8 to 13.5 degrees, which provided a maximum range of 18,700 m (20,500 yd). After the Battle of Dogger Bank in January 1915, where British ships had been able to open fire first, outside the range of the German guns, the turrets were modified to increase maximum elevation at the expense of depression, with the range now -5.5 to 16 degrees, increasing their range to 20,500 m (22,400 yd). Muzzle velocity was 855 m/s (2,810 ft/s).

Secondary armament consisted of fourteen 15 cm SK L/45 quick-firing guns, each mounted individually in casemates in the forecastle deck, seven guns per broadside. Each casemate had its own set of magazines and ammunition hoists. These guns were intended for defense against torpedo-armed destroyers, and were supplied with a total of 2,240 shells. Their rate of fire was 4 to 5 shots per minute. The guns could depress to −7 degrees and elevate to 20 degrees, for a maximum range of 13,500 m (14,800 yd). Their muzzle velocity was 835 m/s (2,740 ft/s).

The ships also carried six 8.8 cm SK L/45 quick-firing guns, mounted in casemates; previous German capital ships had carried a larger number of these guns, but by the time the König class was designed, the growth of destroyers had rendered the 8.8 cm gun of marginal use. The six guns were located on either side of the forward conning tower and were all directed forward. These guns were supplied with a total of 3,200 rounds, or 200 shells per gun, The guns could be elevated up to 25 degrees for a maximum range of 10,694 m (35,085 ft). In addition, they were slated to carry four 8.8 cm SK L/45 anti-aircraft guns, which were to be mounted on either side of the rear conning tower. Production remained behind schedule and competing demands after the start of the war caused further delivery problems. Grosser Kurfürst received her original complement in 1915 and König and Kronprinz had two guns installed that year. Kronprinz had another pair installed by 1918, by which time Markgraf received two of the guns.

As was customary for capital ships of the dreadnought era, the ships were armed with five 50 cm (19.7 in) submerged torpedo tubes, which were supplied with a total of sixteen torpedoes. One tube was mounted in the bow and the other four were placed on the broadside, two on each side of the ship. The torpedoes were the G7*** type, which carried a 195 kg (430 lb) warhead. They could be set at three speeds: 35 knots (65 km/h; 40 mph) for a range of 5,000 m (5,468 yd), 28.5 knots (52.8 km/h; 32.8 mph) for a range of 10,700 m (11,702 yd), or 25.5 knots (47.2 km/h; 29.3 mph) for a range of 12,510 m (13,680 yd).

=== Fire control ===
The König-class carried a pair of 3 m (9.8 ft) stereoscopic rangefinders to direct the fire of the main guns. These were mounted atop the main and aft conning towers, and ranging data was sent to a central command post that had a Bg-Mittler C/13 rangefinder equalizer that was used to filter out erroneous data and calculate ranges to determine the correct elevation of the guns. This information was then sent to the R.W. Geber C/13, a fire-control director, to communicate firing instructions to the guns. The artillery officer used his own periscope sight, which electronically communicated an indicator to the gunners in the turrets; the gunners used their own sights to point the turrets at the target indicated by the artillery officer.

=== Armor ===
The general layout of the armor scheme for the König class was similar to that of the Kaiser class. The steel used for the ships' protection consisted of Krupp cemented armor. Their main armor belt was 35 cm (13.8 in) in the armored citadel of the ships, where the ammunition magazines and propulsion machinery spaces were located. The main strake extended from 1.78 m (5 ft 10 in) above the waterline to 0.36 m (1 ft 2 in) below the line; an upper strake that was 20 cm (7.9 in) thick covered the side of the hull above the main belt. Forward of the central citadel, the belt thinned to 20 cm for a third of the way to the stem, and on the lower edge it tapered to 15 cm. Further forward, the main belt was reduced to 15 cm, being reduced to 12 cm on the bottom edge. Aft of the citadel, the belt stepped down similarly, to 18 cm (7.1 in) and then 15 cm at the stern (tapering to 15 cm and 13 cm (5.1 in) at the lower edge, respectively).

The main armor deck was 6 cm (2.4 in) thick over the citadel, sloping down to meet the lower edge of the belt to provide an additional layer of protection against shell fragments; the sloped section of the deck was increased to 10 cm (3.9 in). The forward deck was increased to 10 cm, while the stern received 6 to 10 cm of armor, increasing to 12 cm over the steering compartment. At upper deck level, a layer of 3 cm (1.2 in) steel covered the central portion of the ship between the end barbettes. Another layer of 3 cm armor covered the forecastle deck over the secondary battery. Behind the belt, a 4 cm (1.6 in) torpedo bulkhead ran the length of the hull, several meters behind the main belt; the bulkhead was designed to contain flooding that might result from torpedo or mine damage. It met the main armor deck where it began to slope down; above the deck, a 3 cm bulkhead extended upward as additional anti-splinter protection. The compartments created on either side of the torpedo bulkhead were used to store coal for the boilers, which reinforced the structure and helped to absorb blast effects; pumps were located amidships to drain these compartments in the event of flooding.

The main battery turrets received 30 cm (11.8 in) of armor on their faces, 25.4 cm (10 in) on the sides, and 29 cm (11.4 in) on the rears to balance them. The turret roofs were sloped at the front, where they were 11 cm (4.3 in), decreasing to 8 cm (3.1 in) on the flat portion. Their supporting barbettes were also 30 cm thick on their exposed sides, though they were reduced to 22 cm (8.7 in) on the sections where one barbette blocked direct fire on another. (Note: For example, the front section of the forward superfiring turret, which was shielded by the turret in front of it.) Behind the upper belt, the barbettes were reduced to 14 cm (5.5 in), and behind the main belt, it was thinned further to 8 cm to save weight. Above the upper belt and between the superfiring turret barbettes was an armored battery for the secondary gun casemates. The sides received 17 cm (6.7 in) of armor plate on the outer sides; the interior of each casemate had 2 cm (0.8 in) on the floor and sides and 1.5 cm (0.6 in) on the rear to contain any fragments from shells that penetrated the battery and exploded inside.

The forward conning tower was protected with heavy armor. According to Gröner and Aidan Dodson, the sides were 30 cm (11.8 in) thick and the roof was 15 cm thick, though John Campbell states it received 35.6 cm on the sides, with a small 40.6 cm (16 in) section at the base of the small gunnery control tower, which stood atop the main conning tower. Campbell also provides a thickness of 17 cm for the main tower roof. The rear conning tower was less well armored; its sides were only 20 cm thick and the roof was covered with 5 cm (2 in) of armor plate; all three sources concur on the aft tower.

=== Modifications ===
The four Königs received relatively minor modifications in their short service lives, all made between mid-1916 and late 1918. The first three ships had their fore masts replaced with the same tubular mast that Kronprinz received as completed. After the Battle of Jutland revealed the danger that dislodged anti-torpedo nets posed to the ships' screws, they were removed. They also had most of their low-angle 8.8 cm guns removed and their firing apertures plated over. König and Grosser Kurfürst retained two of those guns and the former had her anti-aircraft guns replaced with four low-angle mounts in 1918. Markgraf only had two of her low-angle guns removed in 1917, while Kronprinz retained hers for the duration of the war. Another pair of 3-meter rangefinders were installed in the forward- and aftmost main battery turrets, and later in the war, these were replaced with 4.75 m (15 ft 7 in) rangefinders. An improved C/15 version of the Bg-Mittler system was installed, and Kronprinz and Grosser Kurfürst received an Abfeuer-Gerät C/16 gyroscopic stabilizing system for the main guns, which improved accuracy by accounting for the roll of the ships and changes in gun elevation as they moved through the water. König was to have received one as well, but it does not appear that she did, while Markgraf had an improved C/17 version installed.

== Construction ==
Construction data
Ship	Contract name	Builder	Namesake	Laid down	Launched	Commissioned	Fate
König	S	Kaiserliche Werft, Wilhelmshaven	König Wilhelm II von Württemberg	October 1911	1 March 1913	10 August 1914	Scuttled, 21 June 1919
Grosser Kurfürst	Ersatz Kurfürst Friedrich Wilhelm	AG Vulcan, Hamburg	Grosser Kurfürst	October 1911	5 May 1913	30 July 1914	Scuttled, 21 June 1919
Markgraf	Ersatz Weissenburg	AG Weser, Bremen	Margraviate of Baden	November 1911	4 June 1913	1 October 1914	Scuttled, 21 June 1919
Kronprinz	Ersatz Brandenburg	Germaniawerft, Kiel	Kronprinz Wilhelm	November 1911	21 February 1914	8 November 1914	Scuttled, 21 June 1919

== Service history ==
One of the König-class battleships in 1915 or 1916

After the start of the war in July 1914, work on the vessels was accelerated so they would be available for operations as soon as possible. König and Grosser Kurfürst were completed in the first weeks of World War I; the latter had completed sea trials in time to take part in the Raid on Yarmouth on 3 November 1914, as part of the High Seas Fleet, which provided distant cover to the battlecruisers of I Scouting Group that carried out the raid. Grosser Kurfürst participated in the raid on Scarborough, Hartlepool, and Whitby on 15–16 December, again providing distant support to the battlecruisers. Grosser Kurfürst, assigned to III Battle Squadron, formed the vanguard of the German line of battle. During the operation on the morning of 16 December, the High Seas Fleet, commanded by Admiral Friedrich von Ingenohl, briefly clashed with the destroyer screen of the British 1st Battlecruiser Squadron and the 2nd Battle Squadron, which had been sent to intercept their German counterparts (as the British were able to decipher German codes thanks to a set of code books captured from the cruiser Magdeburg in August). Ingenohl, under orders from the Kaiser not to risk the fleet and fearing he had located the scouts for the entire Grand Fleet, disengaged and returned to port.

Markgraf and Kronprinz both completed their trials in January 1915, after which they joined their sisters in III Battle Squadron. They took part in a series of sweeps into the North Sea that failed to locate British forces through 1915, by which time Ingenohl had been replaced by Admiral Hugo von Pohl. They also supported mine-laying operations in the North Sea and periodically rotated through the Baltic for periods of training. These operations continued into early 1916, when Pohl was in turn replaced by Vizeadmiral Reinhard Scheer. The ships again provided cover for I Scouting Group when it bombarded Yarmouth and Lowestoft in April. When the Grand Fleet sortied in response to the raid, Scheer took the fleet back to port to avoid a confrontation with the numerically superior British fleet.

=== Battle of Jutland ===
Painting of a König-class ship under fire at Jutland by Claus Bergen

The four ships took part in the fleet sortie that resulted in the battle of Jutland on 31 May–1 June 1916. The operation again sought to draw out and isolate a portion of the Grand Fleet and destroy it before the main British fleet could retaliate. König, Grosser Kurfürst, Markgraf, and Kronprinz made up V Division of III Battle Squadron, and they were the vanguard of the fleet. III Battle Squadron was the first of three battleship units; directly astern were the Kaiser-class battleships of VI Division, III Battle Squadron. Astern of the Kaiser-class ships were the Helgoland and Nassau classes of the I Battle Squadron; in the rear guard were the elderly Deutschland class pre-dreadnoughts of II Battle Squadron.

Shortly before 16:00 CET, (Note: The times mentioned in this section are in CET, which is congruent with the German perspective. This is one hour ahead of UTC, the time zone commonly used in British works.) the battlecruisers of I Scouting Group encountered the British 1st Battlecruiser Squadron, under the command of David Beatty. The opposing ships began an artillery duel that saw the destruction of Indefatigable, shortly after 17:00, and Queen Mary, less than a half an hour later. By this time, the German battlecruisers were steaming south in order to draw the British ships towards the main body of the High Seas Fleet. At 17:30, König, the leading German battleship, spotted both I Scouting Group and the 1st Battlecruiser Squadron approaching. The German battlecruisers were steaming down to starboard, while the British ships steamed to port. At 17:45, Scheer ordered a two-point turn to port to bring his ships closer to the British battlecruisers, and a minute later at 17:46, the order to open fire was given.

A König-class battleship firing her main guns at Jutland, by Claus Bergen

König, Grosser Kurfürst, and Markgraf were the first to reach effective gunnery range; they engaged the battlecruisers Lion, Princess Royal, and Tiger, respectively, at a range of 21,000 yards. König's first salvos fell short of her target, and so she shifted her fire to the nearest British ship, Tiger. Simultaneously, the leading König-class battleships began firing on the destroyers Nestor and Nicator. The two destroyers closed in on the German line and, having endured a hail of gunfire, maneuvered into a good firing position. Each ship launched two torpedoes apiece at König and Grosser Kurfürst, though all four weapons missed. In return, a secondary battery shell from one of the battleships hit Nestor and wrecked her engine room. The ship, along with the destroyer Nomad, was crippled and lying directly in the path of the advancing German line. Both destroyers were sunk, but German torpedo boats stopped to pick up survivors. At around 18:00, the four Königs shifted their fire to the approaching Queen Elizabeth-class battleships of 5th Battle Squadron, though the firing lasted only a short time before the range widened too far.

Shortly after 19:00, the German cruiser Wiesbaden had become disabled by a shell from Invincible; Konteradmiral (Rear Admiral) Paul Behncke in König attempted to maneuver his ships in order to cover the stricken cruiser. Simultaneously, the British III and IV Light Cruiser Squadrons began a torpedo attack on the German line; while advancing to torpedo range, they smothered Wiesbaden with fire from their main guns. The Königs fired heavily on the British cruisers, but even sustained fire from the Germans' main guns failed to drive off the British cruisers. In the ensuing melee, the British armored cruiser Defence was struck by several heavy-caliber shells from the German dreadnoughts. One salvo penetrated the ship's ammunition magazines and, in a tremendous explosion, destroyed the cruiser. Another melee with the British cruisers developed an hour later, again over the crippled Wiesbaden; during this period, König received a hit aft that caused significant damage.

By the time the German fleet returned to the Jade estuary, the Nassau-class battleships Nassau, Westfalen, and Posen and the Helgoland-class battleships Helgoland and Thüringen took up guard duties in the outer roadstead. The Kaiser-class battleships Kaiser, Kaiserin, and Prinzregent Luitpold, took up defensive positions outside the Wilhelmshaven locks. The four König-class ships, along with other capital ships—those that were still in fighting condition—had their fuel and ammunition stocks replenished in the inner harbor. Kronprinz was the only member of the class to emerge from the action undamaged.

=== Subsequent operations ===
Illustration of König underway by Oscar Parkes

König, Grosser Kurfürst, and Markgraf underwent repairs through July and then conducted training in the Baltic in August before taking part in the sortie that led to the action of 19 August 1916; during the operation, Markgraf and Grosser Kurfürst were temporarily attached to I Scouting Group as several of its battlecruisers had been badly mauled at Jutland and were still under repair. Scheer intended to bombard the British coast, but broke off after he received reports that the Grand Fleet was at sea; in the inconclusive action, German U-boats sank a pair of British light cruisers, and in return one German battleship was damaged by a mine. Further bouts of training in the Baltic, along with fruitless sweeps into the North Sea continued through the rest of 1916. During an operation to recover a pair of U-boats that had grounded off the Danish coast, a British submarine torpedoed Grosser Kurfürst and Kronprinz, though both ships returned to port for repairs. In 1917, the heavy units of the High Seas Fleet were largely restricted to guard duty in the German Bight, as the strategic priority of the German fleet had shifted to the U-boat campaign. During this period, the ships underwent refits that included the installation of the heavy tubular foremasts that Kronprinz had received when initially completed.

In September, as the Imperial German Army prepared to attack the city of Riga in Russia, it requested assistance from the Navy to clear the Gulf of Riga to secure its seaward flank. The Navy transferred significant elements of the High Seas Fleet, including the four Königs, to conduct Operation Albion. The objectives included seizing the Baltic islands of Ösel, Moon, and Dagö, and destroying the Russian naval forces in the gulf, including the pre-dreadnought battleships Slava and Tsesarevich. The attack began on 12 October, with the German battleships bombarding Russian coastal batteries on the Sworbe peninsula. Grosser Kurfürst struck a mine but was able to remain in action. The next phase, the clearing of naval forces in the gulf, began four days later as König and Kronprinz led an attempt to break through Russian defenses. In the ensuing Battle of Moon Sound, the German battleships badly damaged Slava and forced her to scuttle, but the rest of the Russian vessels withdrew. By 20 October, the Germans had completed their objectives, including the Army's successful assault on Riga, allowing the fleet to return to the North Sea, though Markgraf was mined on the return voyage.

=== Fate ===
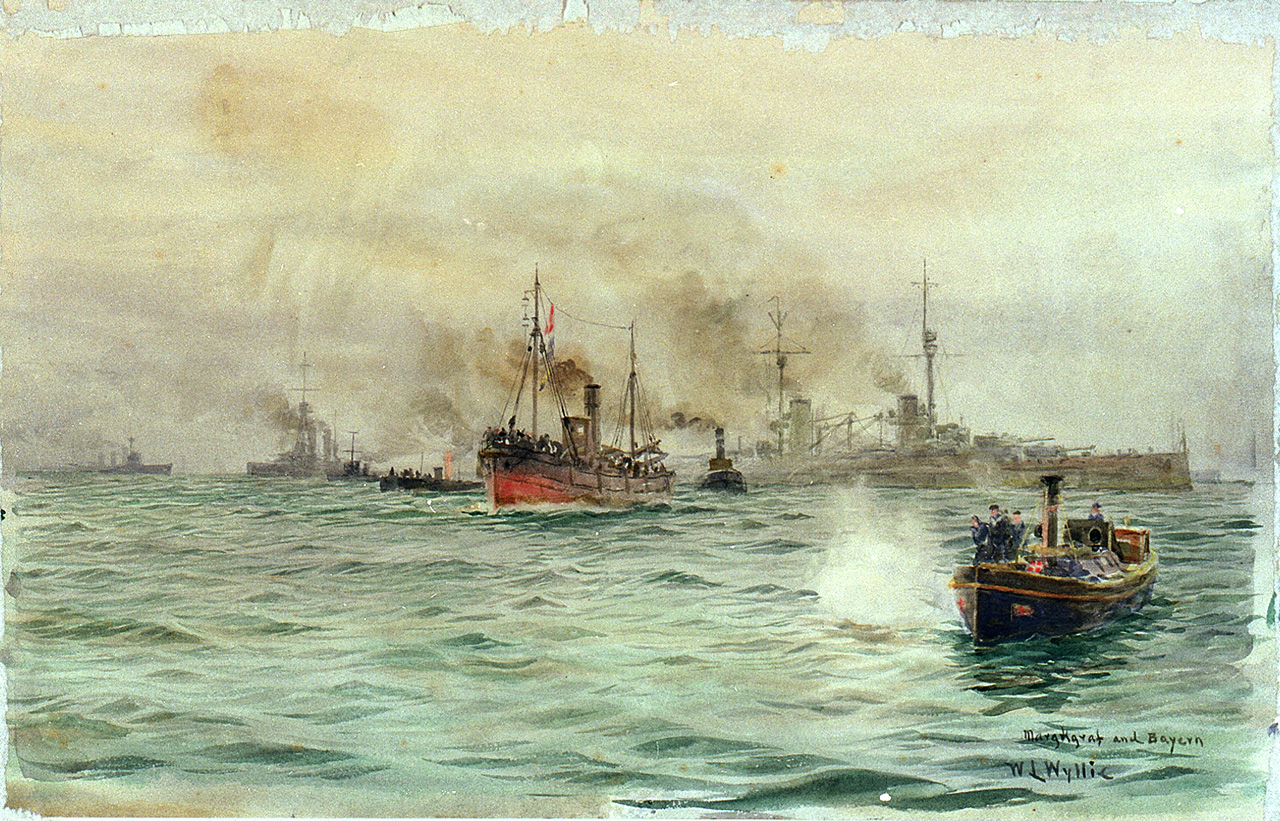
Painting of Markgraf entering the Firth of Forth

The High Seas Fleet saw little significant activity for the rest of 1917 and into mid-1918, apart from routine training exercises and guard duties in the German Bight. In January 1918, Kronprinz was renamed Kronprinz Wilhelm in honor of Crown Prince William. The ships, less Markgraf, which was dry-docked for maintenance, took part in an abortive attempt to intercept a British convoy to Norway in late April. The ships suffered a series of accidents in 1918, including groundings, that required dry-docking for repairs. Scheer, now the head of the Seekriegsleitung (Naval Warfare Command), and Admiral Franz von Hipper, the fleet commander, planned an operation to seek a final battle with the Grand Fleet in October 1918, by which time the war had turned decisively against Germany. When rumors of the plan began to circulate among the fleet's crews, sailors began to desert in large numbers, leading to the Wilhelmshaven mutiny, which forced Scheer and Hipper to cancel the operation.

Following the capitulation of Germany in November 1918, the majority of the High Seas Fleet, under the command of Rear Admiral Ludwig von Reuter, was interned in the British naval base at Scapa Flow. The fleet remained in captivity during the negotiations that ultimately produced the Versailles Treaty. It became apparent to Reuter that the British intended to seize the German ships on 21 June, which was the deadline for Germany to have signed the peace treaty. Unaware that the deadline had been extended to the 23rd, Reuter ordered his ships be sunk. On the morning of 21 June, the British fleet left Scapa Flow to conduct training maneuvers; at 11:20 Reuter transmitted the order to his ships. Of the four ships, Kronprinz was the first to sink in the scuttling of the German fleet at Scapa Flow. She slipped beneath the waters of Scapa Flow at 13:15. Grosser Kurfürst followed 15 minutes later at 13:30. König sank at approximately 14:00, but Markgraf did not sink until 16:45; she was one of the last capital ships to be successfully scuttled—only the battlecruiser Hindenburg sank afterwards, at 17:00.

Grosser Kurfürst was eventually raised, on 29 April 1938. The ship was towed to Rosyth, where she was broken up for scrap metal. The other three ships remain on the sea floor, and were sold to Britain in 1962. The wrecks have been used as sources of low-background steel, which has occasionally been removed for use in scientific devices. The vessels are popular diving sites, and in 2017, marine archaeologists from the Orkney Research Center for Archaeology conducted extensive surveys of the wrecks. A diving contractor, Tommy Clark, came to own the three battleships and the light cruiser Karlsruhe in 1981, which he later placed for sale in 2019. König, Kronprinz, and Markgraf were all purchased by a Middle Eastern company.
