= Felix Funke =

German admiral of the Kaiserliche Marine

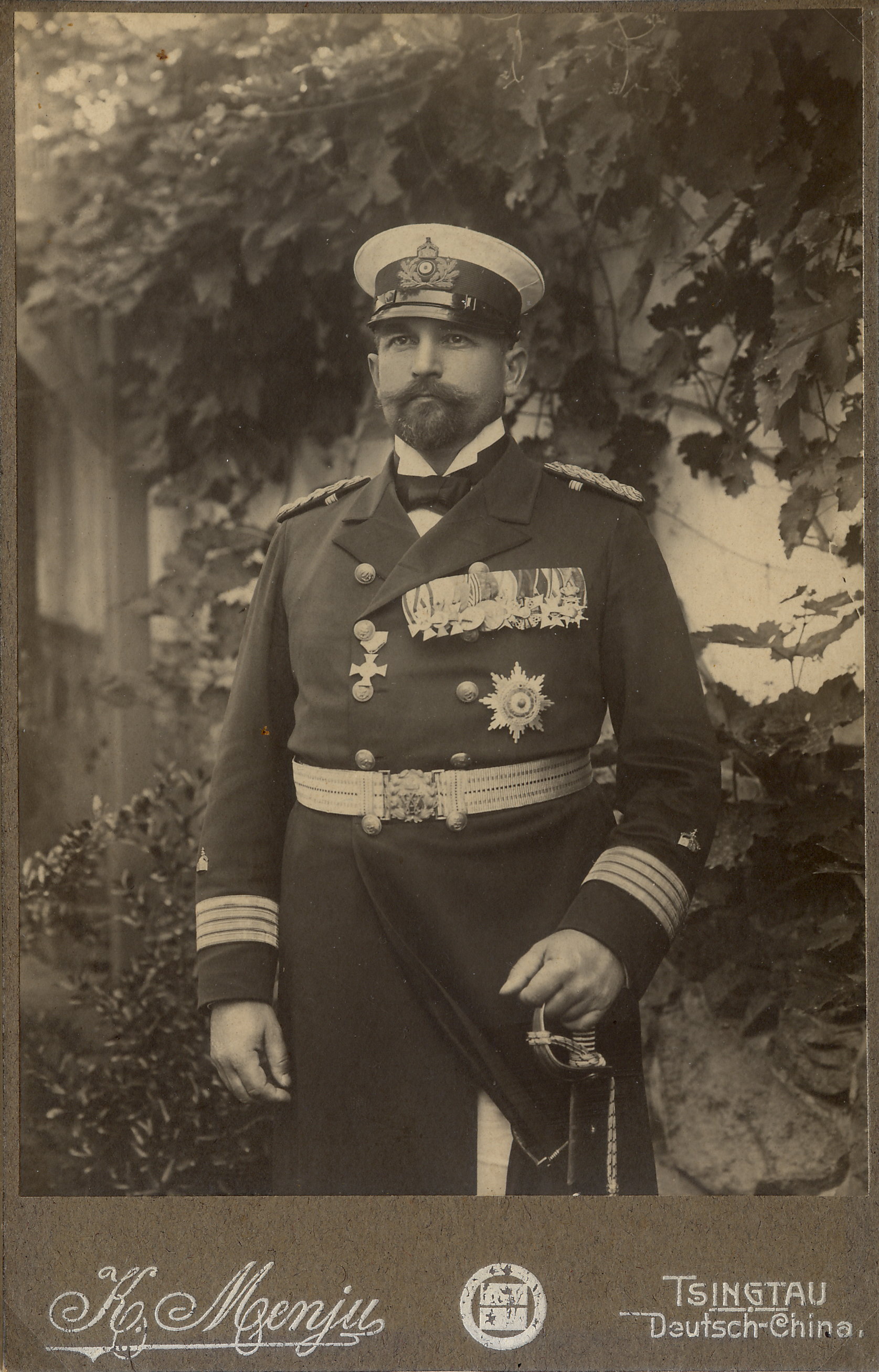
- Felix Funke
- Born: 3 January 1865; Hirschberg, Prussian Silesia, Kingdom of Prussia
- Died: 22 July 1932 (aged 67); Berlin, Germany
- Military career
- Allegiance: German Empire
- Branch: Imperial German Navy
- Service years: 1882–1915
- Rank: Admiral
- Conflicts: World War I *Battle of Dogger Bank (1915)
- Awards: Order of St. Anna

Felix Funke (3 January 1865 – 22 July 1932) was a German admiral of the Kaiserliche Marine (Imperial German Navy).

== Early life ==
Funke was born in Hirschberg (Jelenia Góra), Prussian Silesia. His father Adolf Funke, originally from Magdeburg, was President of the Alsatian Railway Company in Strassburg (Strasbourg). His mother Anna Stilke-Pilet came from a Huguenot family which escaped from Castres after the revocation of the Edict of Nantes.

Funke lived his childhood in Strassburg and attended the German Navy School in Kiel on 18 April 1882. His training in the Kaiserliche Marine started on the sail ship Niobe. His career followed a normal path to become admiral. He was well regarded by William II, German Emperor, with whom he often smoked a cigar in his cabin when the Emperor was on board.

== Russo-Japanese War ==
In 1902 Funke spent four years in Tsing Tao (today: Qingdao), then a German colony in China. In 1904, he was witness to the Russo-Japanese War, in which Germany was neutral.

On 10 August 1904, Funke witnessed the Battle of the Yellow Sea, and as a safe haven, Tsing Tao received the damaged Russian battleship Tsesarevich. The bridge had been hit twice, and Admiral Wilhelm Witthöft had died, along with several other high ranking Russian Officers. The Tsesarevich was joined during the night by the cruiser Novik and destroyers Bezstrashny, Bezshumny, and Bezposchadny. The Novik loaded as much coal as possible and sailed immediately, whilst the destroyers remained and were disarmed after three days.

On 15 August 1904, Vice-Admiral Dewa Shigetō sent the Japanese destroyer Ikazuchi to Tsing Tao to discuss details of the Russian fleet with the governor of Tsing Tao and Admiral Funke, who boarded the Ikazuchi and made a note of the impressive state of cleanliness and order of both ship and crew. He assured Dewa's envoy that Russian ships remaining in the harbour were disarmed.

The two highest remaining Russian commanding officers of the battlegroup, Counter Admiral Matusevich (Vitgeft's Chief of Staff), and Captain Ivanov (commanding the Tsesarevitch) were wounded. After having received a promise from the convalescent Russian officers not to flee, Funke did not hold them in prison but invited them at his home. Later, he received the Order of St. Anna from Tsar Nicholas II of Russia after he had allowed more Russian ships to take refuge and be interned at Tsing Tao, under approval by Admiral Togo, at the fall of Port Arthur on 2 January 1905; the Russian crews were ill and had needed medical care.

== World War I ==
On 3 August 1914 Prince Adalbert of Prussia and Princess Adelheid of Saxe-Meiningen were married in Wilhelmshaven. After the ceremony, the couple paid a visit to Funke on board of his flagship, the SMS Prinzregent Luitpold.

In 1914 Funke was rear admiral of the III Battle Squadron, which included SMS Kaiser, SMS Kaiserin, SMS König Albert, and Prinzregent Luitpold. On 24 December 1914 he received the order to give command of the III Squadron to Admiral Reinhard Scheer whilst taking over command of the II Battle Squadron from Scheer.

Funke participated in several naval battles against the Royal Navy during World War I. He disagreed with some views of Grand Admiral Prince Heinrich of Prussia, specifically with regards to using submarine warfare.

== Retirement and death ==
To his great surprise, he was asked to retire by the Emperor on 18 September 1915. Funke suffered from depression and died aged 67 in 1932 in Berlin, where he had lived in retirement.

== Sources ==
- Funke, Felix. Personal Memoirs. Unpublished (owned by his grand niece).
- Commanders of the High Seas Fleet Battle Squadrons 1914-1918
- Scheer, Reinhard. Germany's High Seas Fleet in the World War online at the War Times Journal website
