= III Battle Squadron =

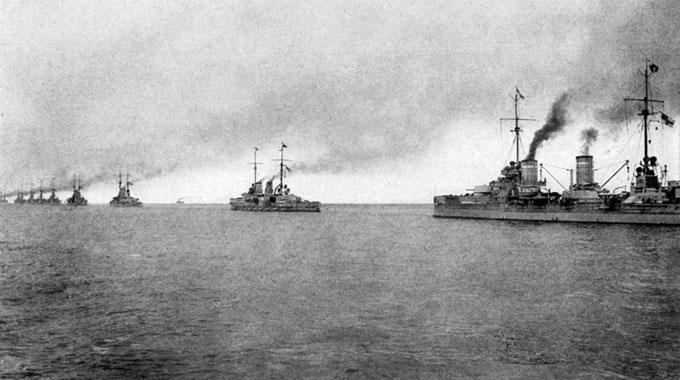
- Dreadnoughts of III Squadron at sea
- Country: German Empire
- Branch: Kaiserliche Marine
- Type: Squadron
- Garrison/HQ: Wilhelmshaven; Kiel
- Engagements: Battle of Jutland

Commanders
- Notable commanders: Reinhard Scheer; Paul Behncke

III Battle Squadron was a unit of the German High Seas Fleet before and during World War I. The squadron saw action throughout the war, including the Battle of Jutland on 31 May – 1 June 1916, where it formed the front of the German line. The ships were interned in Scapa Flow after the end of the war, where they were scuttled by their crews. Most of the ships of the squadron were raised for scrapping, though three remain on the bottom of the harbor.

== Organization ==
III Battle Squadron was divided into V Division and VI Division. For the first half of the wartime service of these divisions, they contained the König and Kaiser classes, respectively. During this period, the battleship SMS König served as the flagship of both the squadron and V Division, while the battleship SMS Kaiser served as the flagship of VI Division. On 1 December 1916, the five Kaiser-class ships were transferred to the newly re-formed IV Battle Squadron while the new battleships Bayern and Baden took their place in III Squadron.

III Battle Squadron operated from one of the two primary bases of the German fleet. The first, in the North Sea, was Wilhelmshaven on the western side of the Jade Bight. The island of Heligoland provided a fortified forward position in the German Bight. The second major naval installation was at Kiel, and it was the most important base in the Baltic. Pillau and Danzig housed forward bases further east in the Baltic. The Kaiser Wilhelm Canal through Schleswig-Holstein connected the Baltic and North Seas and allowed the German Navy to quickly shift naval forces between the two seas.

== Commanders ==
Konteradmiral (KAdm—Rear Admiral) Felix Funke served as the squadron commander from 1913 to December 1914. On 26 December, Funke was transferred to II Battle Squadron, whose commander Vizeadmiral (VAdm–Vice Admiral) Reinhard Scheer, replaced Funke in III Squadron. Scheer served here until January 1916, when he became the commander of the entire High Seas Fleet. KAdm Paul Behncke replaced him as the squadron commander and led the unit during the Battle of Jutland, while KAdm Hermann Nordmann served as his deputy and VI Division commander during the engagement. VAdm Hugo Kraft in turn replaced Behncke in April 1918.

== History ==
Illustration of SMS König, the flagship of III Battle Squadron

III Battle Squadron was organized in 1913 as the new Kaiser-class battleships began to enter service, and it was fully stood up by November 1914, when the last König-class ship joined the unit. III Squadron led the German battle line during all of the major operations during World War I. These included the support missions for the battlecruisers of I Scouting Group as they bombarded the British coast in attempts to lure out part of the British Grand Fleet, such as the raids on Scarborough, Hartlepool and Whitby in December 1914 and on Yarmouth and Lowestoft in April 1916. At the Battle of Jutland in May 1916, III Squadron battleships bore the brunt of British gunfire; the flagship König was hit several times by heavy-caliber shells and damaged badly, but she nevertheless remained in action and returned to port for repairs.

The Squadron, with König again in the van, was present for the operations of 18–19 August and on 18–19 October. In October and November 1917, the squadron participated in Operation Albion, the seizure of the Gulf of Riga. During the Battle of Moon Sound, two of the squadron's battleships, König and Kronprinz, sank the Russian battleship Slava and hit the battleship Tsesarevich. In late April 1918, the High Seas Fleet attempted to attack one of the heavily escorted British convoys to Norway, but the operation was cancelled after the battlecruiser Moltke broke down.

III Squadron was to have participated in a final battle with the Grand Fleet in October 1918, in the closing weeks of the war. Mutinies broke out, first in the ships of I Battle Squadron, when the war-weary crews learned of the suicidal plan; the unrest forced Scheer to cancel the operation. After Germany signed the Armistice at Compiègne, most ships of the High Seas Fleet, including III Squadron, were interned at the main British naval base at Scapa Flow, where they were eventually scuttled by their crews on 21 June 1919. Most of the ships were eventually raised by British salvage firms, though three battleships, all from III Squadron—König, Kronprinz, and Markgraf—remain on the sea floor, too deep to raise.

== See also ==
- Imperial German Navy order of battle (1914)
