= SMS Kaiser (1911) =

Battleship of the German Imperial Navy

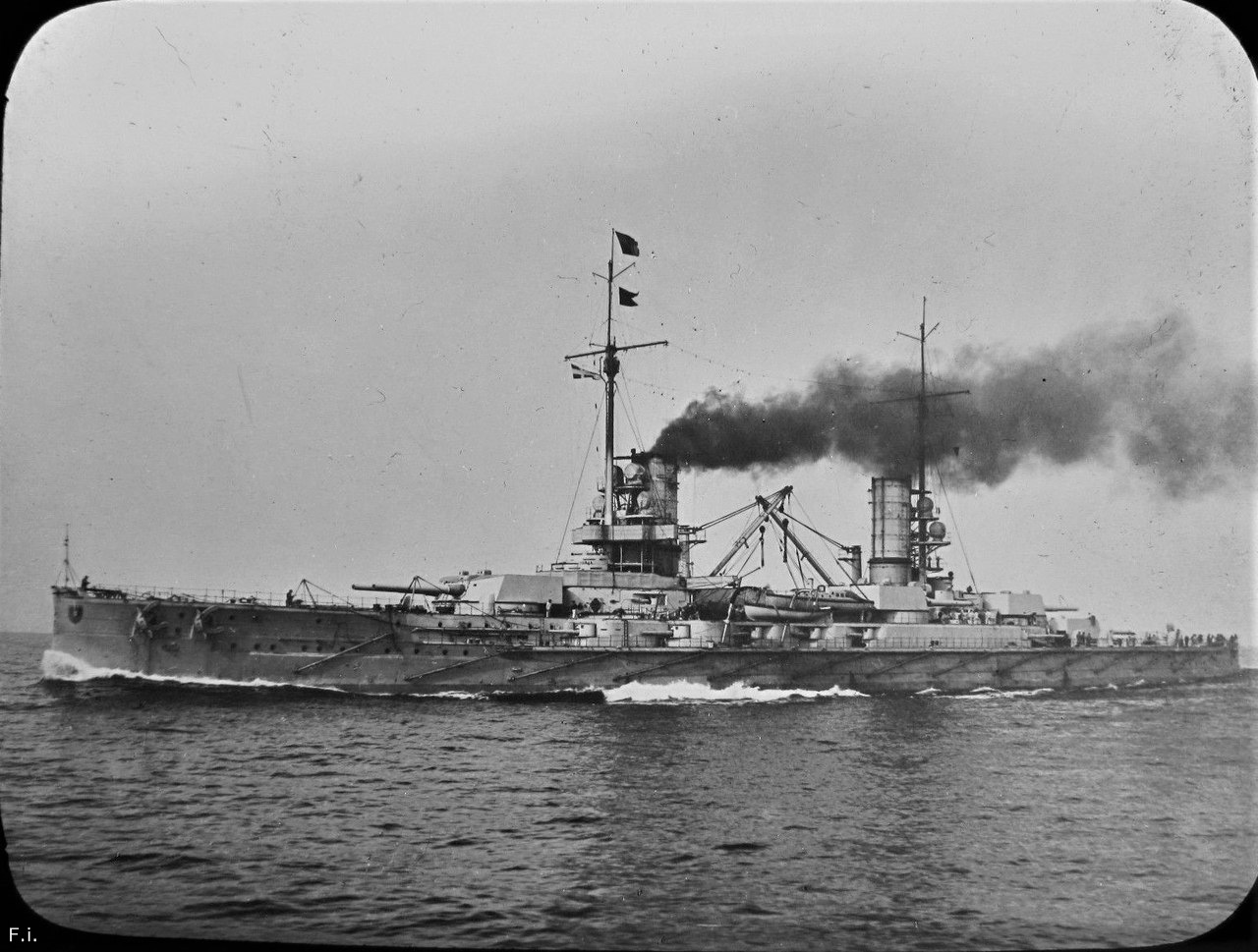
- SMS Kaiser

History

German Empire
- Name: Kaiser
- Namesake: SMS Kaiser
- Builder: Kaiserliche Werft, Kiel
- Laid down: December 1909
- Launched: 22 March 1911
- Commissioned: 1 August 1912
- Fate: Scuttled at Scapa Flow, 21 June 1919

General characteristics
- Class & type: Kaiser-class battleship
- Displacement: Normal: 24,724 t (24,334 long tons); Full load: 27,000 t (27,000 long tons)
- Length: 172.40 m (565 ft 7 in)
- Beam: 29 m (95 ft 2 in)
- Draft: 9.10 m (29 ft 10 in)
- Installed power: 16 × water-tube boilers; 27,617 ihp (20,594 kW)
- Propulsion: 3 × steam turbines; 3 × screw propellers
- Speed: 23.4 knots (43.3 km/h; 26.9 mph)
- Range: 7,900 nmi (14,600 km; 9,100 mi) at 12 knots (22 km/h; 14 mph)
- Crew: 41 officers; 1,043 enlisted
- Armament: 10 × 30.5 cm (12 in) SK L/50 guns; 14 × 15 cm (5.9 in) SK L/45 guns; 12 × 8.8 cm (3.5 in) SK L/45 guns; 5 × 50 cm (19.7 in) torpedo tubes
- Armor: Belt 350 mm (13.8 in); Conning tower: 400 mm (15.7 in); Turrets: 300 mm (11.8 in)

SMS Kaiser (Note: "SMS" stands for "Seiner Majestät Schiff" (German: His Majesty's Ship).) was the lead ship of the Kaiser class of dreadnought battleships of the Imperial German Navy. Kaiser was built by the Imperial Dockyard at Kiel, launched on 22 March 1911 and commissioned on 1 August 1912. The ship was equipped with ten 30.5-centimeter (12 in) guns in five twin turrets, and had a top speed of 23.4 knots (43.3 km/h; 26.9 mph). Kaiser was assigned to III Battle Squadron of the High Seas Fleet for the majority of World War I.

In 1913, Kaiser and her sister König Albert conducted a cruise to South America and South Africa. The ship participated in most of the major fleet operations during the war. She fought at the Battle of Jutland on 31 May – 1 June 1916, during which she was hit twice and suffered negligible damage. The ship was also present during Operation Albion in the Baltic Sea in September and October 1917, and at the Second Battle of Heligoland Bight in November 1917.

During peace negotiations after the end of the war in 1918, she was interned with other ships of the High Seas Fleet at Scapa Flow. On 21 June 1919 the commander of the interned fleet, Rear Admiral Ludwig von Reuter, ordered the fleet to be scuttled to ensure that the British would not be able to seize the ships. The wreck was raised in 1929 and broken up in Rosyth in 1930.

== Design ==
The German 1909 construction program included the last two members of the Helgoland-class battleships, along with two additional dreadnoughts to be built to a new design. The primary change was intended to be the adoption of steam turbines in favor of triple-expansion steam engines used in the earlier vessels. The space savings of turbines permitted a more efficient superfiring arrangement of the main battery, along the same model as the Moltke-class battlecruisers. The new ships' armor layout was significant improved over earlier designs; the Kaiser class was also far superior in defensive characteristics to their British counterparts of the King George V and Iron Duke classes, even if markedly inferior in terms of firepower.

=== Characteristics ===
Plan and profile drawing of the Kaiser class

The ship was 172.4 m (565 ft 7 in) long overall and displaced a maximum of 27,000 metric tons (26,570 long tons) at full load. She had a beam of 29 m (95 ft 2 in) and a draft of 9.1 m (29 ft 10 in) forward and 8.80 m (28 ft 10 in) aft. The ship had an inverted bow and a long forecastle deck that extended for two-thirds the length of the hull. Her superstructure was fairly minimal, consisting primarily of a short, armored conning tower forward and a smaller, secondary conning tower aft. Kaiser had additional facilities for an admiral's staff, as she was intended to serve as a divisional flagship. The ship was fitted with a pair of pole masts for observation and signaling purposes. She had a crew of 41 officers and 1,043 enlisted men.

Kaiser was powered by three sets of Parsons turbines, which drove three screw propellers. The turbines were supplied with steam by sixteen coal-fired water-tube boilers that were vented through a pair of widely spaced funnels. The powerplant produced a top speed of 23.4 knots (43.3 km/h; 26.9 mph). She carried 3,600 metric tons (3,500 long tons) of coal, which enabled a maximum range of 7,900 nautical miles (14,600 km; 9,100 mi) at a cruising speed of 12 knots (22 km/h; 14 mph).

Kaiser was armed with a main battery of ten 30.5 cm SK L/50 guns in five twin turrets. (Note: In Imperial German Navy gun nomenclature, "SK" (Schnelladekanone) denotes that the gun is quick loading, while the L/50 denotes the length of the gun. In this case, the L/50 gun is 50 calibers, meaning that the gun is 45 times as long as it is in bore diameter.) The ship dispensed with the inefficient hexagonal arrangement of previous German battleships; instead, three of the five turrets were mounted on the centerline, with two of them arranged in a superfiring pair aft. The other two turrets were placed en echelon amidships, so that both could fire on the broadside. The ship was also armed with a secondary battery of fourteen 15 cm (5.9 in) SK L/45 guns in casemates amidships. For close-range defense against torpedo boats, she carried eight 8.8 cm (3.5 in) SK L/45 guns in casemates. The ship was also armed with four 8.8 cm L/45 anti-aircraft guns. The ship's armament was rounded out by five 50 cm (19.7 in) torpedo tubes, all mounted in the ship's hull; one was in the bow, and the other four were on the broadside.

Her main armored belt was 350 mm (13.8 in) thick in the central citadel, and was composed of Krupp cemented armor (KCA). Her main battery gun turrets were protected by 300 mm (11.8 in) of KCA on the sides and faces. Kaiser's conning tower was heavily armored, with 400 mm (15.7 in) sides.

== Service history ==
Ordered under the contract name Ersatz Hildebrand as a replacement for the obsolete coastal defense ship Hildebrand, (Note: German warships were ordered under provisional names. Additions to the fleet were given a single letter; ships intended to replace older or lost vessels were ordered as "Ersatz (name of the ship to be replaced)".) Kaiser was laid down at the Imperial Dockyard in Kiel in December 1909. The hull was completed by 22 March 1911, when the ship was launched; this date was specifically chosen, as it was the birthday of Kaiser (Emperor) Wilhelm I. His grandson, Kaiser Wilhelm II, attended the launching ceremony, where German Chancellor Theobald von Bethmann Hollweg gave a speech while Kaiserin (Empress) Augusta Victoria christened the ship. The vessel was named for the earlier ironclad Kaiser. Fitting-out work then began, which was completed by the end of July 1912. On 1 August, the ship was commissioned for sea trials. These were concluded by 7 December; the following day Kaiser joined the fleet as the flagship of V Division. Her first commander was Kapitän zur See (KzS—Captain at Sea) Georg von Ammon, though he was replaced by KzS Friedrich von Bülow in October. Her crew consisted largely of men who had been transferred from the recently decommissioned battleships Elsass and Braunschweig. The first divisional commander was Konteradmiral (KAdm—Rear Admiral) Ehrhard Schmidt.

Kaiser in 1912

After joining the active fleet in December 1912, Kaiser was stationed in Kiel. The ship then conducted individual training. Bülow fell ill in January 1913, so he was relieved by KzS Ernst Ritter von Mann und Edler von Tiechler. In February, Kaiser was transferred to Wilhelmshaven, along with her sister ship Friedrich der Grosse. She then took part in several training exercises with the rest of the High Seas Fleet. These included maneuvers in the North Sea in March and April, artillery drills in the Baltic at the end of the month, and further fleet maneuvers in May. In June, Kaiser took part in the Kiel Week regatta. Kaiser Wilhelm II and Italian King Victor Emmanuel III inspected the ship. The annual summer cruise to Norway was conducted in July and August, followed immediately by the autumn maneuvers in August and September. In September 1913, KzS Adolf von Trotha became the ship's commanding officer, a post he held until January 1916. In October 1913, as the remaining Kaiser-class ships began to enter service, III Battle Squadron was created, and Schmidt became the squadron commander, though he was soon replaced by KAdm Christian Schütz on 1 November. Ten days later, he transferred his flag to Prinzregent Luitpold, which had been built to serve as a squadron flagship.

Kaiser was selected to participate in a long-distance cruise to test the reliability of the new turbine propulsion system. The ship was joined by her sister König Albert and the light cruiser Strassburg in a special "Detached Division" under the command of KAdm Hubert von Rebeur-Paschwitz. The trio departed Germany on 9 December 1913 and proceeded to the German colonies in western Africa; this was the first time that German battleships had visited the colonies. The ships visited Lomé in Togoland, Duala and Victoria in Kamerun, and Swakopmund in German South-West Africa. From Africa, the ships sailed to St. Helena and then on to Rio de Janeiro, arriving on 15 February 1914. There, Hermes da Fonseca, the President of Brazil, visited the ships. Strassburg was detached to visit Buenos Aires, Argentina before returning to meet the two battleships in Montevideo, Uruguay. Rebeur-Paschwitz fell ill in Buenos Aires, so Trotha temporarily took command of the division during his convalescence at a military hospital. The three ships sailed south around Cape Horn and then north to Valparaíso, Chile, arriving on 2 April and remaining for over a week.

On 11 April, the ships departed Valparaíso for the long journey back to Germany. On the return trip, the ships visited several more ports, including Bahía Blanca, Argentina, before returning to Rio de Janeiro. On 16 May the ships left Rio de Janeiro for the Atlantic leg of the journey; they stopped in Cape Verde, Madeira, and Vigo, Spain while en route to Germany. Kaiser, König Albert, and Strassburg arrived in Kiel on 17 June 1914. In the course of the voyage, the ships traveled some 20,000 nautical miles (37,000 km; 23,000 mi). A week later, on 24 June, the Detached Division was dissolved and Kaiser returned to III Squadron. Kaiser then participated in squadron exercises in July. Kaiser joined the High Seas Fleet for its annual summer cruise to Norway in July 1914, about two weeks after the assassination of Archduke Franz Ferdinand in Sarajevo. As a result of rising international tensions, the cruise was cut short and the German fleet was back in Wilhelmshaven by 29 July. Following the outbreak of war on 28 July and the subsequent German invasion of Belgium and France, the United Kingdom declared war on Germany at midnight on 4 August. Two days before, KAdm Carl Schaumann hoisted his flag aboard Kaiser as the deputy commander of III Squadron.

=== World War I ===
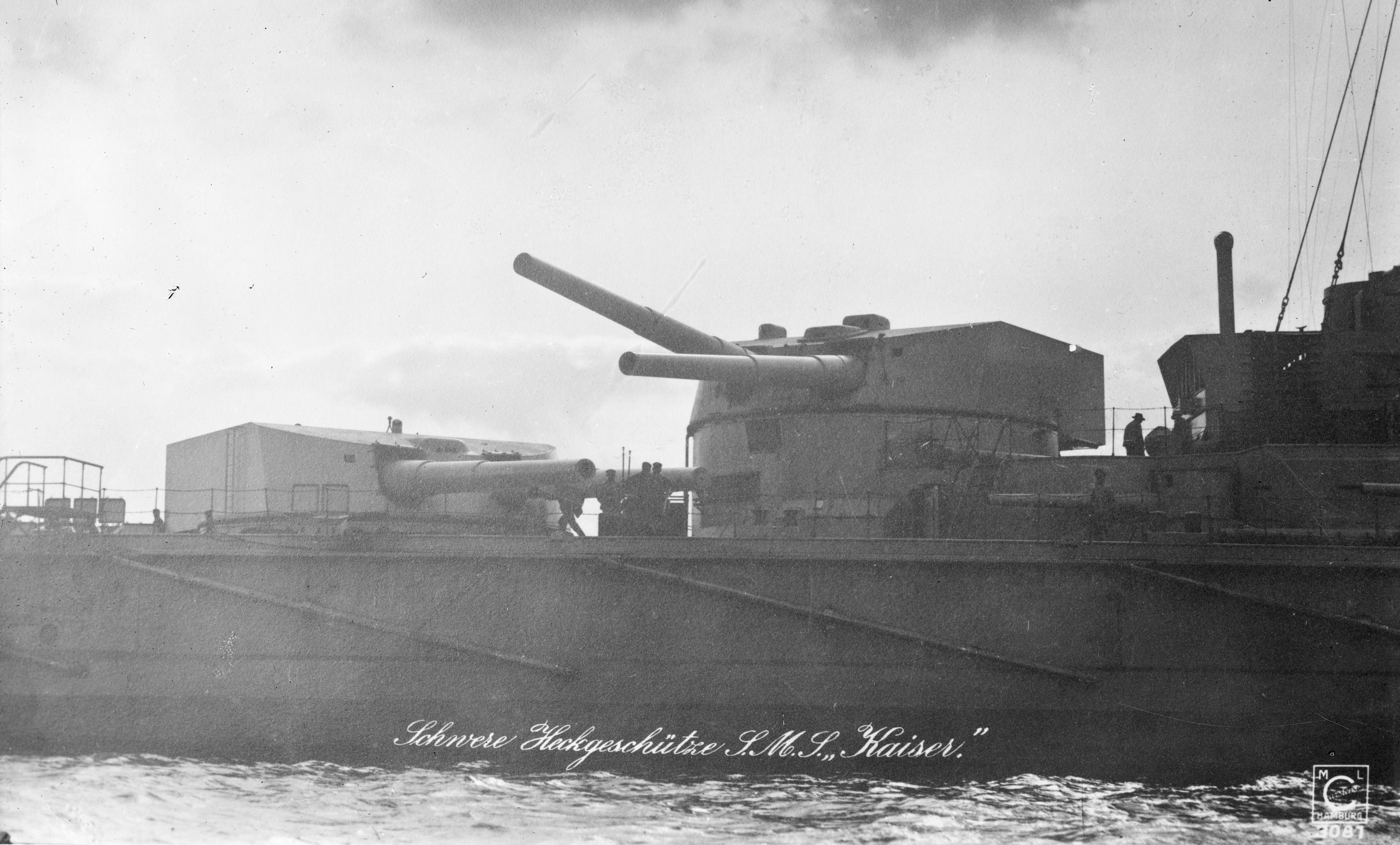
Kaiser's rear superfiring turrets

The High Seas Fleet, including Kaiser, conducted a number of sweeps and advances into the North Sea. The first occurred on 2–3 November 1914, though no British forces were encountered. Admiral Friedrich von Ingenohl, the commander of the High Seas Fleet, adopted a strategy in which the battlecruisers of KAdm Franz von Hipper's I Scouting Group raided British coastal towns to lure out portions of the Grand Fleet where they could be destroyed by the High Seas Fleet. The raid on Scarborough, Hartlepool and Whitby on 15–16 December 1914 was the first such operation. On the evening of 15 December, the German battle fleet of some twelve dreadnoughts—including Kaiser and her four sisters—and eight pre-dreadnoughts came to within 10 nmi (19 km; 12 mi) of an isolated squadron of six British battleships. However, skirmishes between the rival destroyer screens in the darkness convinced Ingenohl that he was faced with the entire Grand Fleet. Under orders from Kaiser Wilhelm II to avoid risking the fleet unnecessarily, Ingenohl broke off the engagement and turned the battlefleet back toward Germany.

Following the loss of SMS Blücher at the Battle of Dogger Bank in January 1915, the Kaiser removed Ingenohl from his post on 2 February. Admiral Hugo von Pohl replaced him as commander of the fleet. Pohl conducted a series of fleet advances in 1915 in which Kaiser took part; in the first one on 29–30 March, the fleet steamed out to the north of Terschelling and return without incident. Another followed on 17–18 April, where Kaiser and the rest of the fleet covered a mining operation by II Scouting Group. Three days later, on 21–22 April, the High Seas Fleet advanced towards the Dogger Bank, though again failed to meet any British forces. Kaiser was in dock in Kiel for periodic maintenance during the operation on 17–18 May, but she was back with the fleet for the sortie on 29–30 May, during which the fleet advanced as far as Schiermonnikoog before being forced to turn back by inclement weather. On 10 August, the fleet steamed to the north of Helgoland to cover the return of the auxiliary cruiser Meteor. A month later, on 11–12 September, the fleet covered another mine-laying operation off the Swarte Bank. The last operation of the year, conducted on 23–24 October, was an advance without result in the direction of Horns Reef.

On 12 January 1916, Vizeadmiral (Vice Admiral) Reinhard Scheer replaced Pohl as the fleet commander. The same month, KzS Walter von Keyserlink took command of Kaiser. Kaiser was present during the fleet advance on 5–7 March, though this too ended without action. While in port in Kiel, the old pre-dreadnought Hannover accidentally collided with Kaiser, though neither ship was seriously damaged. Scheer continued the series of fleet operations practiced by his predecessors; the fleet conducted sweeps of the North Sea on 26 March, 2–3 April, and 21–22 April. The battlecruisers conducted another raid on the English coast on 24–25 April, during which Kaiser and the rest of the fleet provided distant support. Scheer planned another raid for mid-May, but the battlecruiser Seydlitz had struck a mine during the previous raid and the repair work forced the operation to be pushed back until the end of the month.

==== Battle of Jutland ====
Diagram of the Battle of Jutland showing the major movements

Almost immediately after the Lowestoft raid, Scheer began planning another foray into the North Sea. He had initially intended to launch the operation in mid-May, by which time the mine damage to Seydlitz was scheduled to be repaired—Scheer was unwilling to embark on a major raid without his battlecruiser forces at full strength. On 9 May, however, several battleships developed problems with their engines, which delayed the operation further, to 23 May. On 22 May, Seydlitz was still not fully repaired, and the operation was again postponed, this time to 29 May. At noon on 29 May, the repairs to Seydlitz were finally completed, and the ship returned to I Scouting Group. The plan called for Hipper's battlecruisers to steam north to the Skagerrak, with the intention of luring out a portion of the British fleet so it could be destroyed by Scheer's waiting battleships.

Kaiser and the rest of III Battle Squadron were the leading unit of the High Seas Fleet; the four König-class battleships led the line. Kaiser, the flagship of KAdm Hermann Nordmann, was directly astern of the four Königs. I Battle Squadron, composed of the eight Helgoland- and Nassau-class battleships, followed III Squadron, with the six elderly pre-dreadnoughts of II Battle Squadron bringing up the rear. Hipper's five battlecruisers left the Jade estuary at 02:00 on 31 May; Scheer, with the High Seas Fleet, followed an hour and a half later.

Shortly before 16:00 CET, (Note: The times mentioned in this section are in CET, which is congruent with the German perspective. This is one hour ahead of UTC, the time zone commonly used in British works.) the battlecruisers of I Scouting Group encountered the British 1st Battlecruiser Squadron, under the command of David Beatty. The opposing ships began an artillery duel that saw the destruction of Indefatigable, shortly after 17:00, and Queen Mary, less than half an hour later. By this time, the German battlecruisers were steaming south in order to draw the British ships towards the main body of the High Seas Fleet. At 17:30, König's crew spotted both I Scouting Group and the 1st Battlecruiser Squadron approaching. The German battlecruisers were steaming to starboard, while the British ships steamed to port. At 17:45, Scheer ordered a two-point turn to port to bring his ships closer to the British battlecruisers, and a minute later at 17:46, the order to open fire was given.

Between 17:48 and 17:52, Kaiser, Kronprinz, Friedrich der Grosse, and all eight battleships of I Squadron opened fire on several ships of the 2nd Light Cruiser Squadron; Kaiser, Ostfriesland, and Nassau engaged HMS Southampton, though only Nassau managed to score a hit on the cruiser. In the span of eight minutes, Kaiser fired eleven salvos at Southampton without success. The 2nd LCS then moved back out of range, having largely escaped unscathed. At 17:58, Scheer ordered the fleet to maximum speed; the greater speed of the Königs caused the distance between Kaiser and König to rapidly increase. At 18:05, Southampton again came into range, and Kaiser opened fire. Kaiser fired four salvos at a range of 12,000 m (13,000 yd), though again without scoring any hits. After three minutes of firing, Kaiser's guns again fell silent.

Illustration of Kaiser underway

Starting at 18:10, Kaiser began firing on the 5th Battle Squadron battleship Malaya; in the span of 25 minutes, Kaiser fired 27 salvos at an average range of 17,300 m (18,900 yd). The British destroyers Nestor and Nomad, which had been disabled earlier in the engagement, lay directly in the path of the advancing High Seas Fleet. Shortly before 18:30, Kaiser and her three sister ships opened fire on Nomad with their secondary batteries. The hail of 15-cm shells smothered the ship; a fire was started and one shell detonated the ship's forward ammunition magazine. Nomad sank stern first at 18:30. Nestor was meanwhile destroyed by the battleships of I Squadron.

Shortly after 19:00, the German cruiser Wiesbaden had become disabled by a shell from the British battlecruiser Invincible; KAdm Paul Behncke in König attempted to maneuver III Squadron to cover the stricken cruiser. Simultaneously, the British 3rd and 4th Light Cruiser Squadrons began a torpedo attack on the German line; while advancing to torpedo range, they smothered Wiesbaden with fire from their main guns. The eight III Squadron battleships fired on the British cruisers, but even sustained fire from the battleships' main guns failed to drive off the British cruisers. The armored cruisers Defence, Warrior, and Black Prince joined in the attack on the crippled Wiesbaden. Between 19:14 and 19:17, Kaiser and several other battleships and battlecruisers opened fire on Defence and Warrior. Defence was struck by several heavy caliber shells from the German dreadnoughts. One salvo penetrated the ship's ammunition magazines and, in a massive explosion, destroyed the cruiser.

As Warrior limped away to the west, the Queen Elizabeth-class battleships of the 5th Battle Squadron joined the Grand Fleet as it entered the battle from the north. However, Warspite was forced to haul out of line to the south, towards the oncoming German fleet. Warspite came under intense fire from the approaching German battleships; Kaiser scored a hit on Warspite that damaged her steering gear and forced her to steam in a circle, out of control. After completing two full circles and sustaining 13 heavy hits, Warspite came back under control and rejoined the squadron. However, by 20:00 the steering gear had again failed, so the ship was forced to withdraw from the engagement.

By 20:15, the German fleet had faced the Grand Fleet for a second time and was forced to turn away; in doing so, the order of the German line was reversed. Kaiser was now the fifth ship from the rear of the German line, ahead of only the four König-class battleships. Kaiser was hit twice in quick succession by heavy-caliber shells, at 20:23 and three minutes later. The Common Pointed, Capped, shells came from the 30.5 cm guns of Agincourt. One shell penetrated the upper deck and landed in a hammock stowage compartment below the No. 7 casemate; the shell failed to explode and instead broke up on impact, starting a small fire that was quickly put out. The other shell probably exploded outside the ship.

Shortly before 21:30, Kaiser, Prinzregent Luitpold, and Markgraf spotted British light forces approaching. The German ships opened fire at a range of around 7,300 m (8,000 yd) with both their main and secondary armament. The light cruiser Calliope was badly damaged, which forced the British ships to withdraw. At around 23:30, the German fleet reorganized into the night cruising formation. Kaiser was the twelfth ship, in the center of the 24-ship line.

After a series of night engagements between the leading battleships and British destroyers, the High Seas Fleet punched through the British light forces and reached Horns Reef by 04:00 on 1 June. The German fleet reached Wilhelmshaven a few hours later; the I Squadron battleships took up defensive positions in the outer roadstead and Kaiser, Kaiserin, Prinzregent Luitpold, and Kronprinz stood ready just outside the entrance to Wilhelmshaven. The remainder of the battleships and battlecruisers entered Wilhelmshaven, where those that were still in fighting condition replenished their stocks of coal and ammunition. The two shell hits suffered by Kaiser had been largely ineffectual, wounding only one crewmember.

==== Subsequent operations ====
On 18 August, Scheer attempted a repeat of the 31 May operation; the two serviceable German battlecruisers—Moltke and Von der Tann—supported by three dreadnoughts, were to bombard the coastal town of Sunderland in an attempt to draw out and destroy Beatty's battlecruisers. The rest of the fleet, including Kaiser, would trail behind and provide cover. The British were aware of the German plans and sortied the Grand Fleet to meet them, leading to the action of 19 August 1916. By 14:35, Scheer had been warned of the Grand Fleet's approach and, unwilling to engage the whole of the Grand Fleet just eleven weeks after the decidedly close call at Jutland, turned his forces around and retreated to German ports.

The fleet advanced as far as the Dogger Bank on 19–20 October. The operation led to a brief action on 19 October, during which a British submarine torpedoed the cruiser München. The failure of the operation (coupled with the action of 19 August) convinced the German naval command to abandon its aggressive fleet strategy in favor of a resumption of the unrestricted submarine warfare campaign. Two weeks later, on 4 November, Kaiser took part in an expedition to the western coast of Denmark to assist two U-boats—U-20 and U-30—that had become stranded there. On 1 December, the High Seas Fleet was reorganized; Kaiser and her sisters were transferred to the newly created IV Battle Squadron, with Kaiser as the flagship of KAdm Gottfried von Dalwigk zu Lichtenfels. In 1917, the policy of unrestricted submarine warfare was reinstated; the surface units of the German navy were therefore tasked with covering the departures and arrivals of the U-boats. As a result, Kaiser spent most of the year on picket duty in the German Bight. In May 1917, Kaiser went into the dock for periodic maintenance.

==== Operation Albion ====
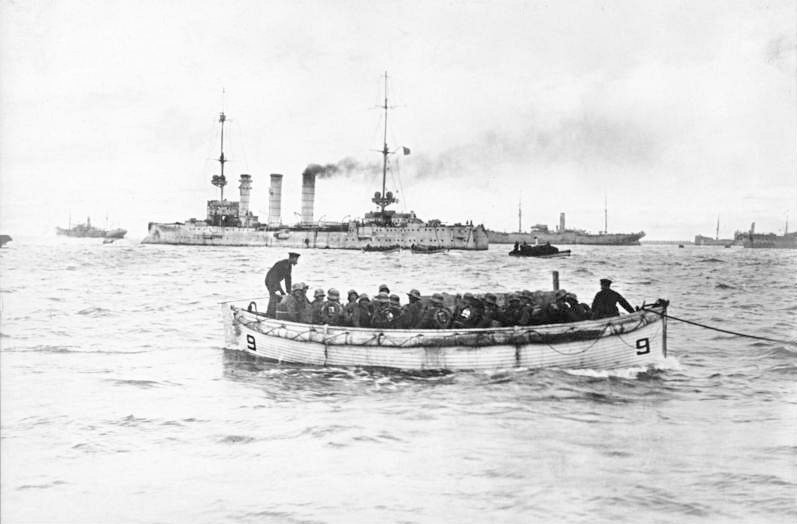
German troops landing at Ösel

In early September 1917, following the German Army's conquest of the Russian port of Riga, the Navy decided to eliminate the Russian naval forces that still held the Gulf of Riga. The Admiralstab (the Navy High Command) planned an operation to seize the Baltic island of Ösel, and specifically the Russian gun batteries on the Sworbe peninsula. On 18 September, the order was issued for a joint operation with the army to capture Ösel and Moon islands; the primary naval component was organized into a Special Unit, which comprised the flagship, Moltke, along with IV Battle Squadron of the High Seas Fleet. IV Squadron was composed of V and VI Divisions. V Division included the four König-class ships, and was by this time augmented with the new battleship Bayern. VI Division consisted of the five Kaiser-class battleships. Along with 9 light cruisers, 3 torpedo boat flotillas, and dozens of mine warfare ships, the entire force numbered some 300 ships, supported by over 100 aircraft and 6 zeppelins. The invasion force amounted to approximately 24,600 officers and enlisted men. Opposing the Germans were the old Russian pre-dreadnoughts Slava and Tsesarevich, the armored cruisers Bayan, Admiral Makarov, and Diana, 26 destroyers, and several torpedo boats and gunboats. The garrison on Ösel numbered some 14,000 men.

On 24 September, Kaiser left Kiel, bound for the Putziger Wiek, where she rendezvoused with several other battleships. From there, the ship went to Libau, which she reached on 10 October. Two days later, on the morning of 12 October, Kaiser, joined by her sisters Kaiserin and Prinzregent Luitpold, opened fire on the Russian shore batteries at Cape Hundsort. On 14 October, Kaiser engaged the Russian destroyer Grom and disabled the ship's engine with a single hit. Grom was captured and taken in tow, but she quickly foundered. Kaiser then bombarded Russian positions on Cape Toffri on 16 October.

By 20 October, the fighting on the islands was winding down; Moon, Ösel, and Dagö were in German possession. The previous day, the Admiralstab had ordered the cessation of naval actions and the return of the dreadnoughts to the High Seas Fleet as soon as possible. On 31 October Kaiser and the rest of the Special Unit were detached from the operation and sent back to Kiel, which they reached by 2 November. Kaiser was back in the North Sea on 7 November.

==== Final operations ====
Kaiser and Kaiserin were assigned to security duty in the Bight on 17 November; they were tasked with providing support to II Scouting Group (II SG) and several minesweepers. Two British light cruisers, Calypso and Caledon, attacked the minesweepers and II SG in the Second Battle of Helgoland Bight. Kaiser and her sister intervened and hit one of the light cruisers. The two ships briefly engaged the battlecruiser Repulse, but neither side scored any hits, and the German commander failed to press the attack. On 2 February 1918, the light cruiser Stralsund struck a mine; Kaiser was among those ships that sortied to escort the damaged cruiser back to port.

In late 1917, light forces of the High Seas Fleet began interdicting British convoys to Norway, which prompted the British to detach battleships from the battle fleet to protect the convoys. The Germans were now presented with an opportunity for which they had been waiting the entire war: a portion of the Grand Fleet could be isolated and destroyed. Hipper planned the operation: the battlecruisers of I Scouting Group, along with light cruisers and destroyers, would attack one of the large convoys, while the rest of the High Seas Fleet would stand by, ready to attack the British battleship squadron. At 05:00 on 23 April 1918, Kaiser and the rest of the fleet departed from the Schillig roadstead. Hipper ordered wireless transmissions be kept to a minimum, to prevent radio intercepts by British intelligence. At 06:10 the German battlecruisers had reached a position approximately 60 kilometers (37 mi) southwest of Bergen when Moltke lost her inner starboard propeller, which severely damaged the ship's engines. Despite this setback, Hipper continued northward. By 14:00, Hipper's force had crossed the convoy route several times but had found nothing. At 14:10, Hipper turned his ships southward. By 18:37, the German fleet had made it back to the defensive minefields surrounding their bases. It was later discovered that the convoy had left port a day later than expected by the German planning staff.

In August, KzS Hermann Bauer took command of the ship; his period in command lasted to the end of the war in November. Kaiser was to have taken part in a final fleet action days before the Armistice, an operation which envisioned the bulk of the High Seas Fleet sortieing from their base in Wilhelmshaven to engage the British Grand Fleet. In order to retain a better bargaining position for Germany, Admirals Hipper and Scheer intended to inflict as much damage as possible on the British navy, whatever the cost to the fleet. Consequently, on 29 October 1918, the order was given to depart from Wilhelmshaven to consolidate the fleet in the Jade roadstead, with the intention of departing the following morning. However, starting on the night of 29 October, sailors on Thüringen mutinied. The unrest spread to other battleships, which forced Hipper and Scheer to cancel the operation.

=== Fate ===
Map of the scuttled ships showing Kaiser (#18); click for a larger view

In early November 1918, Germany agreed to surrender according to terms laid out in the Armistice of 11 November 1918; one of the clauses of the agreement stipulated that the bulk of the High Seas Fleet must be interned while negotiations for the eventual peace treaty were held. After proposals to send the fleet to Norway or Spain failed, the Allies settled on the British naval base at Scapa Flow. Kaiser was among the list of ships to be interned. The fleet was commanded by KAdm Ludwig von Reuter. Prior to the departure of the German fleet, now-Admiral Adolf von Trotha made clear to Reuter that he could not allow the Allies to seize the ships under any conditions.

On 21 November, the fleet rendezvoused with the British light cruiser Cardiff, which led the ships to the Allied fleet that was to escort the Germans to Scapa Flow. The Allied fleet consisted of some 370 British, American, and French warships. The Germans initially sailed to the Firth of Forth, and from there, proceeded in smaller groups to Scapa Flow. Once the ships were interned, their guns were disabled through the removal of their breech blocks, and their crews were reduced to 200 officers and enlisted men. The fleet remained in captivity during the negotiations that ultimately produced the Versailles Treaty.

A copy of The Times informed Reuter that the Armistice was to expire at noon on 21 June 1919, the deadline by which Germany was to have signed the peace treaty. Reuter came to the conclusion that the British intended to seize the German ships after the Armistice expired. Unaware that the deadline had been extended to the 23rd, Reuter ordered the ships to be sunk. (Note: There is some contention as to whether Reuter was aware that the Armistice had been extended. Admiral Sydney Fremantle stated that he informed Reuter on the evening of the 20th, though Reuter claims he was unaware of the development. For Fremantle's claim, see Bennett, p. 307. For Reuter's statement, see Herwig, p. 256.) On the morning of 21 June, the British fleet left Scapa Flow to conduct training maneuvers, and at 11:20 Reuter transmitted the order to his ships. Kaiser sank at 13:24; the wreck was sold to Cox & Danks Shipbreaking Co. on 11 April 1928. The ship was raised on 20 March 1929 and towed to Rosyth, arriving on 29 July 1929. Kaiser was broken up for scrap there between 11 September 1929 and 23 December 1931.
