= Claus Bergen =

German artist

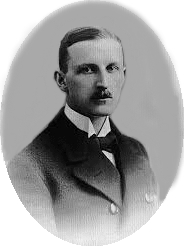
- Claus Bergen, circa 1915
- Born: 18 April 1885; Stuttgart, Kingdom of Württemberg, German Empire
- Died: 4 October 1964 (aged 79); Lenggries, Bavaria, West Germany
- Occupations: Illustrator, marine and landscape painter

Claus Friedrich Bergen (18 April 1885 – 4 October 1964) was a German illustrator and painter, best known for his depictions of naval warfare in World War I.

== Early life and career ==
The Harbor of Polperro, Cornwall. C. Bergen, ca. 1907

Bergen was born 18 April 1885, in Stuttgart, Germany, the first son of Fritz Bergen, a popular painter and illustrator of the Imperial era. He was raised in Munich, where, starting in 1904, he attended Moritz Weinhold's painting school and the Royal Academy of Fine Art, studying under Carl von Marr.

Beginning in 1907, Bergen created more than 450 illustrations for Karl May's popular adventure tales. Continually printed and re-printed in books and periodicals, Bergen's depictions of the Old West, India, Arabia, and other exotic locales came to be widely associated with May's stories. In 1910 his illustrations were exhibited at the Wereldtentoonstelling in Brussels.

He travelled extensively, visiting Norway, England, the Mediterranean and America while exhibiting and furthering his training. He developed a specialty of painting naval subjects, as well as fishing scenes and coastal views. A series of paintings of the Cornish fishing village of Polperro attracted particular attention.

== Wartime painting ==
In 1914 Bergen was appointed Marine Painter to Kaiser Wilhelm II. After the 1916 Battle of Jutland there was enormous demand for depictions of the action, both from the public and the captains of ships which had participated; to satisfy it, Admiral Scheer, the High Seas Fleet commander, took the fleet into the Baltic with Bergen aboard his flagship and went through a replay of the battle complete with blank firing of the guns. In the 1930s many of these paintings were included in the Laboe Naval Memorial at Kiel, and were later placed in the Tamm Museum in Hamburg, Germany.

U-Boat, World War I, C. Bergen

Battle of Jutland, 1916, C. Bergen

In June and July 1917, Bergen took the unprecedented step of joining the crew of the submarine U-53, under Kapitänleutnant Hans Rose, on an Atlantic combat patrol. The series of paintings that resulted is often considered to be among his finest work.

In the interwar period he painted numerous officially-commissioned large scale land- and seascapes, while his friendship with commanders such as Erich Raeder and Karl Doenitz led to continuing work for the German Navy.

Bergen's brother Otto was an aviator in the Great War, and the two were childhood friends of Ernst Udet, one of Germany's top fighter pilots. These associations led to Bergen painting many aviation scenes, and commissions within Germany's aviation industry. Several of his works were used to decorate the interior of the giant Dornier Do X luxury flying boat, which first flew in 1929.

Claus Bergen joined the NSDAP in 1922. During the Second World War he was placed on the Nazis' "God-gifted list", which gave him protected status as a cultural asset, thereby exempting him from military service. Several of his works appeared in the Nazi-sponsored Great German Art Exhibitions, held annually at the House of German Art in Munich from 1937 to 1944. His painting Against England (1940) was purchased by Adolf Hitler for 12,000 Reichsmark, and other works of his were purchased by other top Nazi officials; however, none of Bergen's work displays anti-Semitic or exaggeratedly pro-Aryan themes. At the war's end, he was not prosecuted for his Nazi associations.

== The Nazis' counter piece to Guernica: The Bombardment of Almeria ==
A week after the Bombing of Guernica, on 31 May 1937, the Spanish city Almería was also bombed by the German Army. The latter attack was in response to the events on 24 May, when republican bombers commanded by Russian pilots attacked the German battleship Deutschland near Ibiza, killing several sailors and injuring more than seventy. Hitler wanted to declare war on the Republic, but in the end he retaliated by ordering the attack on the city of Almeria. The bombardment of both Guernica and Almeria were echoed in art. In June or July 1937, Bergen was commissioned by the Nazis to paint The Bombardment of Almeria by Admiral Scheer, assumably as counter-piece to Pablo Picasso's Guernica, shortly after Guernica was displayed at the Paris World Exhibition. The work, done by Claus Bergen, was executed in realistic style, as the Nazis strongly disapproved of modern art – like Picasso's works. The Bombardment of Almeria by Admiral Scheer was hung at the Great German Art Exhibition in Munich, 1937, after it had already opened. It was displayed in a hurry, fresh out of the workshop, as the paint had not yet dried.

Newly discovered documents from the German Bundesarchiv (R43/3575) show that Hitler bought at the Great German Art Exhibition 1937, The Bombardment of Almeria for 7,500 Reichsmark. The work was destinated for the Reichskanzlei in Berlin. The Nazis' counter piece to Guernica can be seen in the United Kingdom, as it was seized in 1945 by the British and, despite requests for restitution, is held by the National Maritime Museum in Greenwich, London.

== Later life ==
After the Second World War Bergen continued painting, with more emphasis on his career-long interest in smaller paintings of landscapes and historic sailing ships.

In 1963 he gave his painting The Atlantic to President Kennedy (now displayed at the Kennedy Library in Boston) and donated a painting of Admiral Nelson's flagship HMS Victory to the British Admiralty. The following year, his paintings illustrated the naval section of Life magazine's series on the First World War.

In the late 1970s a dramatic Bergen painting was used on the box of the popular board game Bismarck.

He continued painting until his death on 4 October 1964, in Lenggries, Bavaria.

== See also ==
- List of German painters
