= II Battle Squadron =

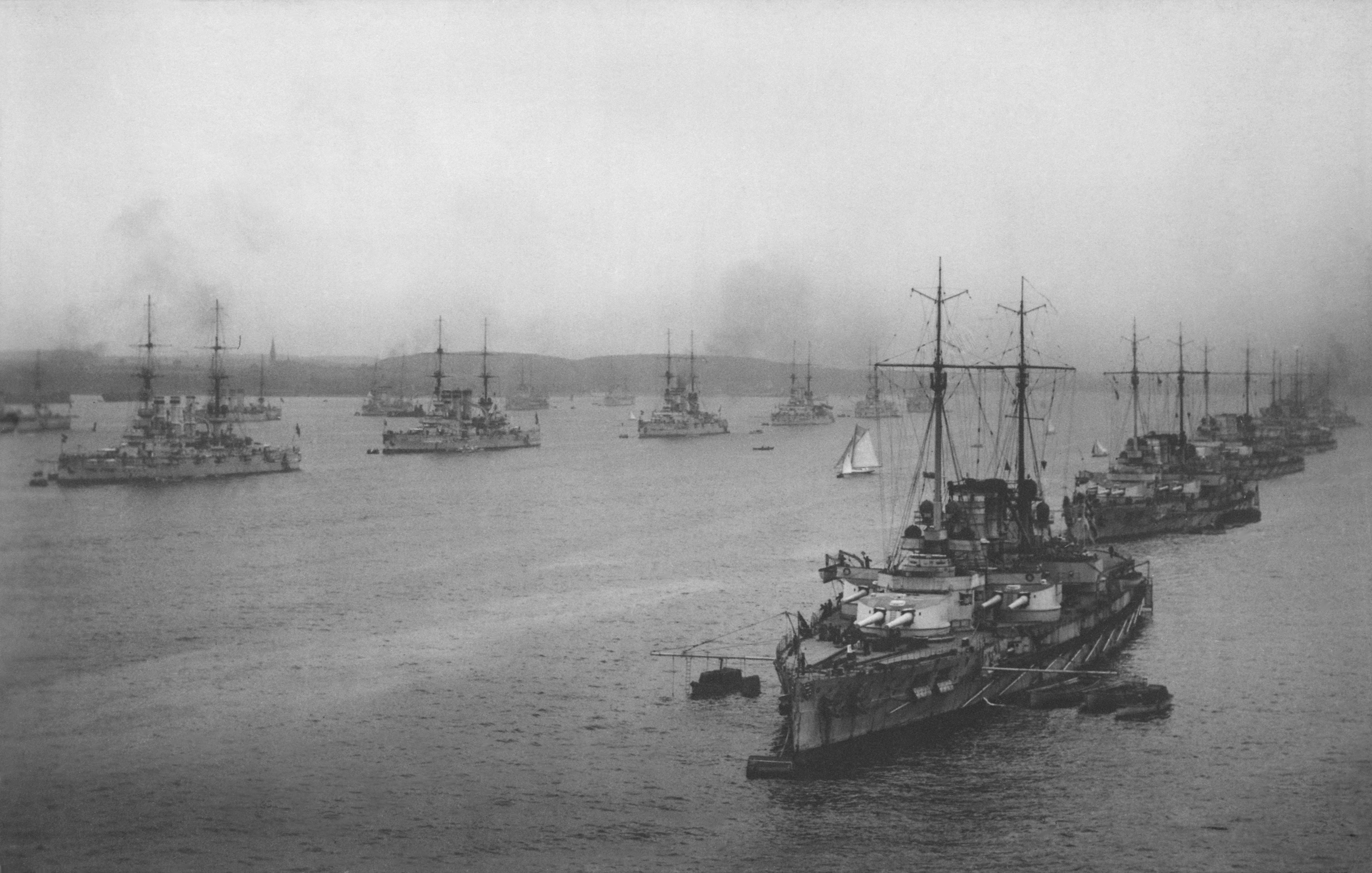
- The I (foreground) and II Squadrons (background) in Kiel
- Country: German Empire
- Branch: Kaiserliche Marine
- Type: Squadron
- Garrison/HQ: Wilhelmshaven; Kiel
- Engagements: Battle of Jutland

Commanders
- Notable commanders: Reinhard Scheer; Felix Funke; Franz Mauve; Hubert von Rebeur-Paschwitz

The II Battle Squadron was a unit of the German High Seas Fleet before and during World War I. The squadron saw action throughout the war, including the Battle of Jutland on 31 May – 1 June 1916, where it formed the rear of the German line.

== Organization ==
The II Battle Squadron was divided into the III Division and the IV Division; the divisions initially were composed of eight of the ten Deutschland and Braunschweig-class battleships. At the time, SMS Deutschland was the flagship of the High Seas Fleet and was also assigned to the II Battle Squadron, though only for tactical purposes—the ship was not otherwise subordinate to the squadron commander.

The II Battle Squadron operated from one of the two primary bases of the German fleet. The first, in the North Sea, was Wilhelmshaven on the western side of the Jade Bight. The island of Heligoland provided a fortified forward position in the German Bight. The second major naval installation was at Kiel, and it was the most important base in the Baltic. Pillau and Danzig housed forward bases further east in the Baltic. The Kaiser Wilhelm Canal through Schleswig-Holstein connected the Baltic and North Seas and allowed the German Navy to quickly shift naval forces between the two seas.

== Commanders ==
Konteradmiral (KAdm—Rear Admiral) Reinhard Scheer served as the commander of the squadron from January 1913 to 26 December 1914, when he traded commands with KAdm Felix Funke, who had commanded the III Battle Squadron. KAdm Franz Mauve, formerly the IV Division commander, replaced Funke in August 1915. He held the role until November 1916, when he was promoted to Vizeadmiral (VAdm—Vice Admiral) and given command of the IV Battle Squadron. Mauve was replaced by VAdm Hubert von Rebeur-Paschwitz, who was the final commander of the unit.

== History ==
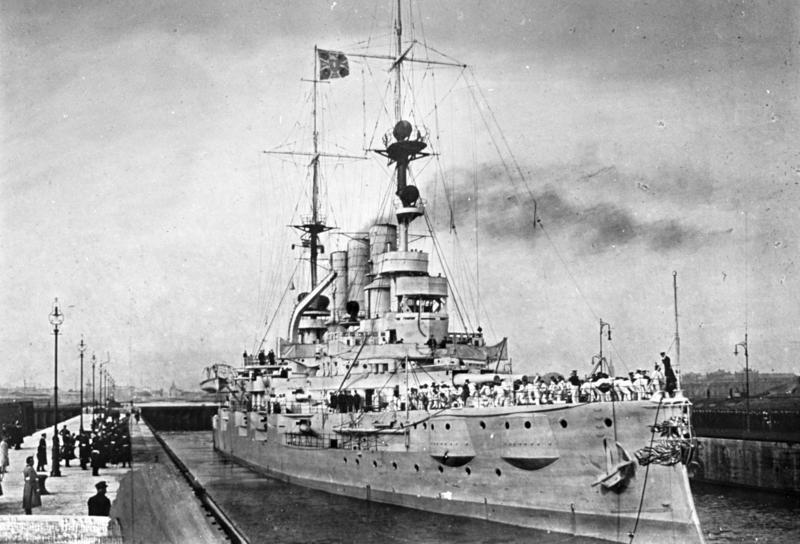
SMS Deutschland, the flagship of Franz Mauve at the Battle of Jutland

As part of his program of naval expansion to rival the British Royal Navy, Admiral Alfred von Tirpitz projected the need for a second squadron of eight battleships in his 1898 Naval Law. By 1907, enough new battleships had been completed to stand the new squadron up at full strength.

The ships of the II Battle Squadron took part in all of the major fleet actions in the first three years of the war. These included the support missions for the battlecruisers of the I Scouting Group as they bombarded the British coast in attempts to lure out part of the British Grand Fleet, such as the raids on Scarborough, Hartlepool and Whitby in December 1914 and on Yarmouth and Lowestoft in April 1916. At the Battle of Jutland in May 1916, the ships formed the rear of the German line, though they saw relatively little combat during the daylight action apart from a brief skirmish with the British battlecruiser squadron. The squadron consisted of only six ships at the time, as Preussen had been transferred temporarily to the Baltic for guard duty and SMS Lothringen was in such poor condition that Scheer removed the ship from the squadron. In the night fighting against the British destroyer flotillas, Pommern was torpedoed and sunk, killing her entire crew.

The loss of Pommern highlighted the vulnerability of the other pre-dreadnoughts to underwater attack, and the II Battle Squadron thereafter remained in port when the High Seas Fleet sortied. On 15 August 1917, the II Battle Squadron was disbanded; the former members of the squadron were thereafter decommissioned and used in subsidiary roles or employed as guard ships.

== See also ==
- Imperial German Navy order of battle (1914)
