= German ship Sachsen =

Several naval ships of Germany were named Sachsen after the federal state of Saxony:

- SMS Sachsen (1877): 7,800-ton Sachsen-class ironclad, launched 1877
- SMS Sachsen (1916): 29,000-ton Bayern-class battleship, not completed
- German frigate Sachsen: Sachsen-class (Type 124) frigate
