= SMS Baden =

Battleship of the German Imperial Navy

Coordinates: 49°49′42″N 2°23′21″W

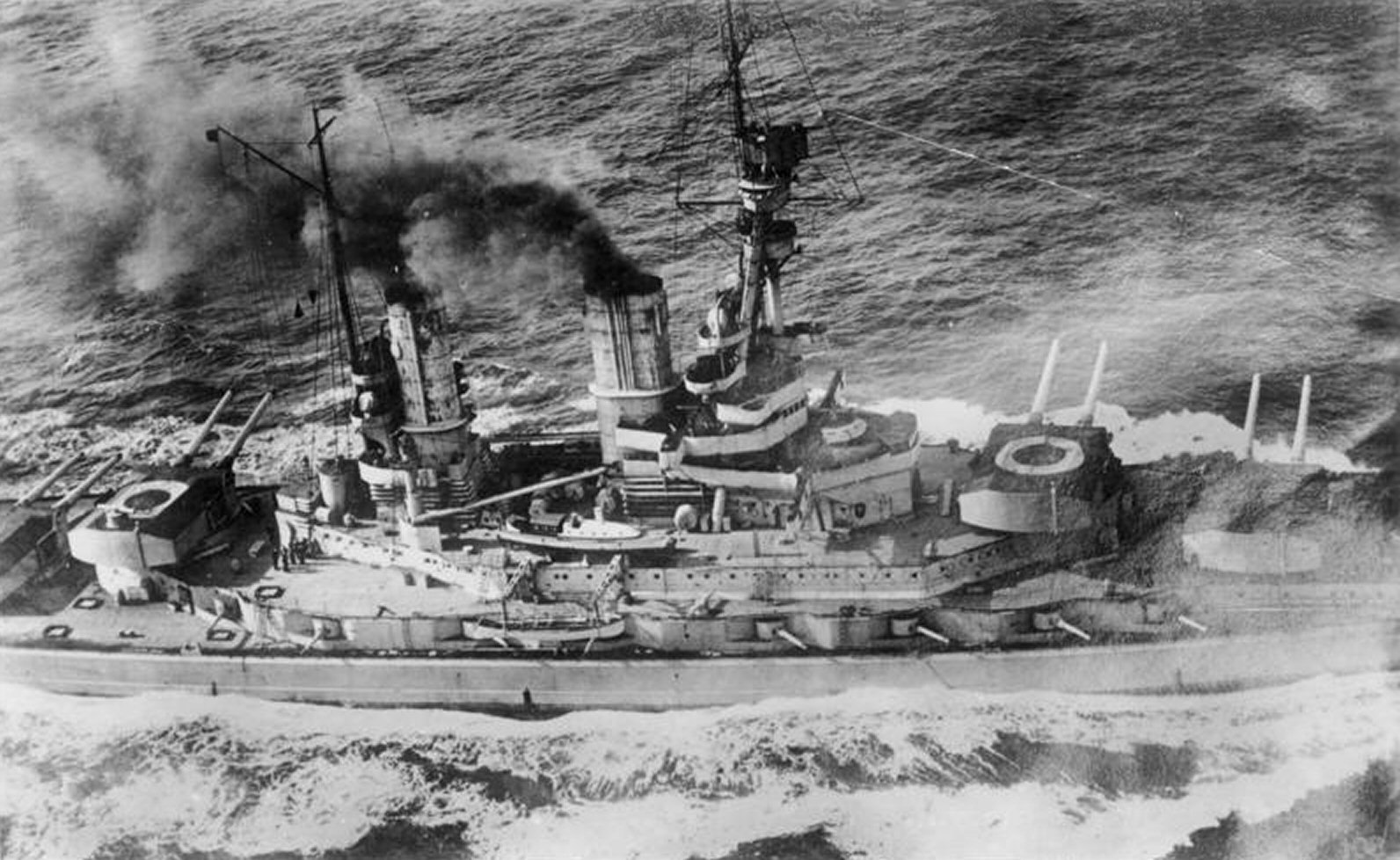
- Baden, with her main battery trained to port

History

German Empire
- Name: SMS Baden
- Namesake: Baden
- Builder: Schichau-Werke
- Laid down: 20 December 1913
- Launched: 30 October 1915
- Commissioned: 14 March 1917
- Fate: Sunk as target, 16 August 1921

General characteristics
- Class & type: Bayern-class battleship
- Displacement: Normal: 28,530 t (28,080 long tons); Full load: 32,200 t (31,700 long tons)
- Length: 180 m (590 ft 7 in) loa
- Beam: 30 m (98 ft 5 in)
- Draft: 9.4 m (30 ft 10 in)
- Installed power: 14 × water-tube boilers; 35,000 metric horsepower (35,000 shp)
- Propulsion: 3 × steam turbines; 3 × screw propellers
- Speed: 21 knots (39 km/h; 24 mph)
- Range: 5,000 nmi (9,300 km; 5,800 mi) at 12 knots (22 km/h; 14 mph)
- Complement: 42 officers; 1,129 enlisted men
- Armament: 8 × 38 cm (15 in) SK L/45 guns; 16 × 15 cm (5.9 in) SK L/45 guns; 4 × 8.8 cm (3.5 in) SK L/45 guns; 5 × 60 cm (24 in) torpedo tubes
- Armor: Belt: 170 to 350 mm (6.7 to 13.8 in); Deck: 60 to 100 mm (2.4 to 3.9 in); Turrets: 200 to 350 mm (7.9 to 13.8 in); Conning tower: 400 mm (15.7 in)

SMS (Note: "SMS" stands for "Seiner Majestät Schiff", or "His Majesty's Ship".) Baden was a Bayern-class dreadnought battleship of the German Imperial Navy built during World War I. Launched in October 1915 and completed in March 1917, she was the last battleship completed for use in the war; two of her sisters—Sachsen and Württemberg—were incomplete when the war ended. The ship mounted eight 38-centimeter (15 in) guns in four twin turrets, displaced 32,200 metric tons (31,700 long tons; 35,500 short tons) at full combat load, and had a top speed of 21 knots (39 km/h; 24 mph). Along with her sister Bayern, Baden was the largest and most powerfully armed battleship built by the Imperial Navy.

Upon commissioning into the High Seas Fleet, Baden was made the fleet flagship, replacing Friedrich der Grosse. Baden saw little action during her short career; the only major sortie in April 1918 ended without any combat. Following the German collapse in November 1918, Baden was interned with the majority of the High Seas Fleet at Scapa Flow by the British Royal Navy. On 21 June 1919, Rear Admiral Ludwig von Reuter ordered the scuttling of the fleet. However, British sailors in the harbor managed to board Baden and beach her to prevent her sinking. The ship was refloated, thoroughly examined, and eventually sunk in extensive gunnery testing by the Royal Navy in 1921.

== Design ==
Armor layout for Bayern; the numbers represent the armor thickness in millimeters in each area

Design work on the Bayern class began in 1910 in the context of the Anglo-German naval arms race, with initial discussions focused on the caliber of the main battery; previous German battleships had carried 30.5 cm (12 in) guns, but as foreign navies adopted 34 cm (13.5 in) and 35.6 cm (14 in) weapons, the German naval command felt the need to respond with larger guns of their own. They considered 32 cm (12.6 in), 38 cm (15 in), and 40 cm (15.7 in) guns. Admiral Alfred von Tirpitz, the State Secretary of the Reichsmarineamt (Imperial Naval Office), was able to use public outcry over the Agadir Crisis to pressure the Reichstag (Imperial Diet) into appropriating additional funds for the Kaiserliche Marine (Imperial Navy) to offset the additional cost of the larger weapons. The design staff settled on the 38 cm caliber since the 40 cm was significantly more expensive and the 38 cm gun marked a significant improvement over existing German guns.

Baden was 179.4 m (588 ft 7 in) long at the waterline, and 180 m (590 ft 7 in) long overall. She had a draft of between 9.3–9.4 m (30 ft 6 in – 30 ft 10 in). Baden displaced 28,530 metric tons (28,080 long tons) at her designed displacement, which did not include a full load of combat supplies, fuel, and other operational necessities; at full combat load, she displaced up to 32,200 metric tons (31,700 long tons). Baden's displacement was more than 3,000 t (3,000 long tons) greater than that of the preceding König-class ships, making her the largest battleship built by the Imperial Navy. Baden was powered by three sets of Schichau steam turbines, with steam provided by fourteen water-tube boilers, of which eleven were coal-fired and three were oil burning. The propulsion system was rated at 35,000 metric horsepower (35,000 shp) and produced a maximum of 56,275 metric horsepower (55,505 shp) on trials. Her design speed was 21 knots (39 km/h; 24 mph), but Baden achieved a maximum speed of 22.1 knots (40.9 km/h; 25.4 mph). Upon commissioning, she carried a crew of 42 officers and 1,129 enlisted men.

The ship was the first German warship armed with eight 38 cm (15 in) SK L/45 guns. (Note: In Imperial German Navy gun nomenclature, "SK" (Schnelladekanone) denotes that the gun is quick loading, while the L/45 denotes the length of the gun. In this case, the L/45 gun is 45 calibers, meaning that the gun is 45 times as long as it is in bore diameter.) The main battery guns were arranged in four twin gun turrets: two superfiring turrets each fore and aft. Her secondary armament consisted of sixteen 15 cm (5.9 in) SK L/45 guns, four 8.8 cm (3.5 in) SK L/45 guns and five 60 cm (23.6 in) underwater torpedo tubes, one in the bow and two on each beam. The ship had an armored belt that was 170–350 mm (6.7–13.8 in) thick and an armored deck that was 60–100 mm (2.4–3.9 in) thick. Her forward conning tower had 400 mm (15.7 in) sides, and the main battery turrets had 350 mm thick sides and 200 mm (7.9 in) thick roofs.

== Service history ==
Baden was ordered under the provisional name Ersatz Wörth in 1912, (Note: German warships were ordered under provisional names. Additions to the fleet were given a single letter; ships intended to replace older or lost vessels were ordered as "Ersatz (name of the ship to be replaced)".) under the fourth and final Naval Law, which was passed that year. Construction began at the Schichau-Werke dockyard in Danzig under construction number 913. The ship was laid down on 20 December 1913 and launched on 30 October 1915. Work was delayed considerably by the start of World War I, first by the Russian advance into East Prussia that threatened the shipyards in Danzig and was checked at the Battle of Tannenberg. Once work in the yards resumed, resources were diverted to complete the battlecruiser Lützow and the ex-Russian light cruisers Elbing and Pillau. Work on the ship resumed in earnest after those projects were completed, and Baden was ready for sea trials by 19 October 1916; the tests were conducted between December and January 1917, and the ship was commissioned into service on 14 March. Baden's two sister ships, Sachsen and Württemberg, both lay incomplete at the end of World War I and were subsequently scrapped, leaving Baden the last battleship built for the Imperial Navy. Most of her crew, including her captain, Victor Harder, came directly from Lützow, which had been sunk at the Battle of Jutland in June 1916.

After her commissioning into the High Seas Fleet, Baden was placed in the role of flagship for the commander of the fleet, Vice Admiral Franz von Hipper, a position she held until the end of the war. At the end of August 1917, Baden took Kaiser Wilhelm II to visit the fortified island of Helgoland; the ship was escorted by the battlecruiser Derfflinger and the light cruisers Emden and Karlsruhe. After the conclusion of the visit, Baden returned the Kaiser to Cuxhaven. The ship struck the sea bottom outside Cuxhaven, though no major damage was done. The ship saw little activity for the rest of the year, as significant elements of the fleet were detached for Operation Albion, the assault on the Gulf of Riga; with the fleet divided, it could not take any offensive action in the North Sea, and so Baden remained idle until the fleet reassembled.

=== Advance of 23 April 1918 ===
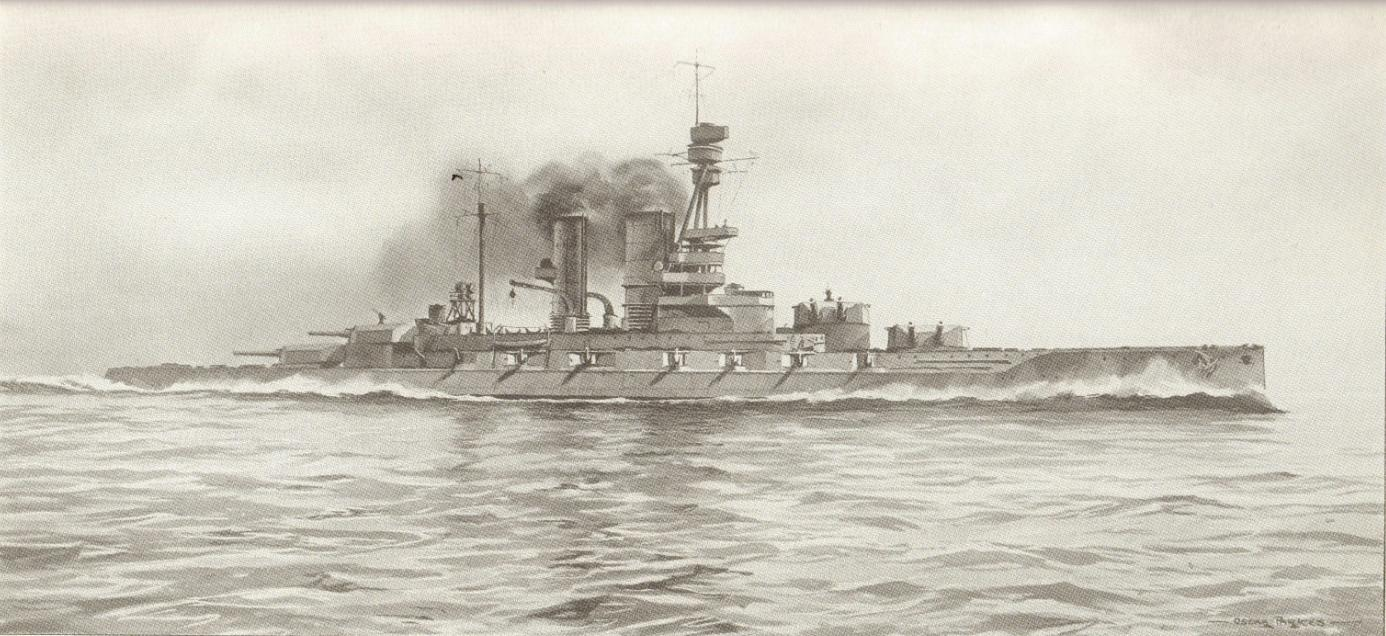
Recognition drawing of a Bayern-class battleship

In late 1917, light forces of the High Seas Fleet began interdicting British convoys to Norway. (Note: Britain had promised to ship 250,000 short tons (230,000 t) of coal to Norway every month. See: Massie, p. 747.) On 17 October the light cruisers Brummer and Bremse intercepted one of the convoys, sinking nine of the twelve cargo ships and the two escorting destroyers before turning back to Germany. On 12 December, four German destroyers ambushed a second British convoy of five cargo vessels and two British destroyers. All five transports were sunk, as was one of the destroyers. Following these two raids, Admiral David Beatty, the commander of the Grand Fleet, detached battleships from the battle fleet to protect the convoys. The German Imperial Navy (Kaiserliche Marine) was now presented with an opportunity for which it had been waiting the entire war: a portion of the numerically stronger Grand Fleet was separated and could be isolated and destroyed. Hipper planned the operation: the battlecruisers of I Scouting Group, along with light cruisers and destroyers, would attack one of the large convoys, while the rest of the High Seas Fleet would stand by, ready to attack the British dreadnought battleship squadron.

At 05:00 on 23 April 1918, the German fleet departed from the Schillig roadstead. Hipper, aboard Baden, ordered wireless transmissions be kept to a minimum, to prevent radio intercepts by British intelligence. At 06:10 the German battlecruisers had reached a position approximately 60 kilometers (37 mi) southwest of Bergen when the battlecruiser Moltke lost her inner starboard propeller, which severely damaged the ship's engines. The crew effected temporary repairs that allowed the ship to steam at 4 kn (7.4 km/h), but it was decided to take the ship under tow. Despite this setback, Hipper continued northward. By 14:00, Hipper's force had crossed the convoy route several times but had found nothing. At 14:10, Hipper turned his ships southward. By 18:37, the German fleet had made it back to the defensive minefields surrounding their bases. It was later discovered that the convoy had left port a day later than expected by the German planning staff.

On 24 May, Baden again steamed to Helgoland, this time to take the commander in chief of the fleet, Admiral Reinhard Scheer, and Grand Duke Friedrich von Baden to visit the island. Only Karlsruhe joined the ship on this voyage. In August, Baden was dry docked for maintenance, and on the 7th of the month, Hipper replaced Scheer as the fleet commander. Baden was refloated on 24 August in preparation for what was to be the last major training exercise of the fleet, conducted on 6 September.

=== Mutiny and Scapa Flow ===
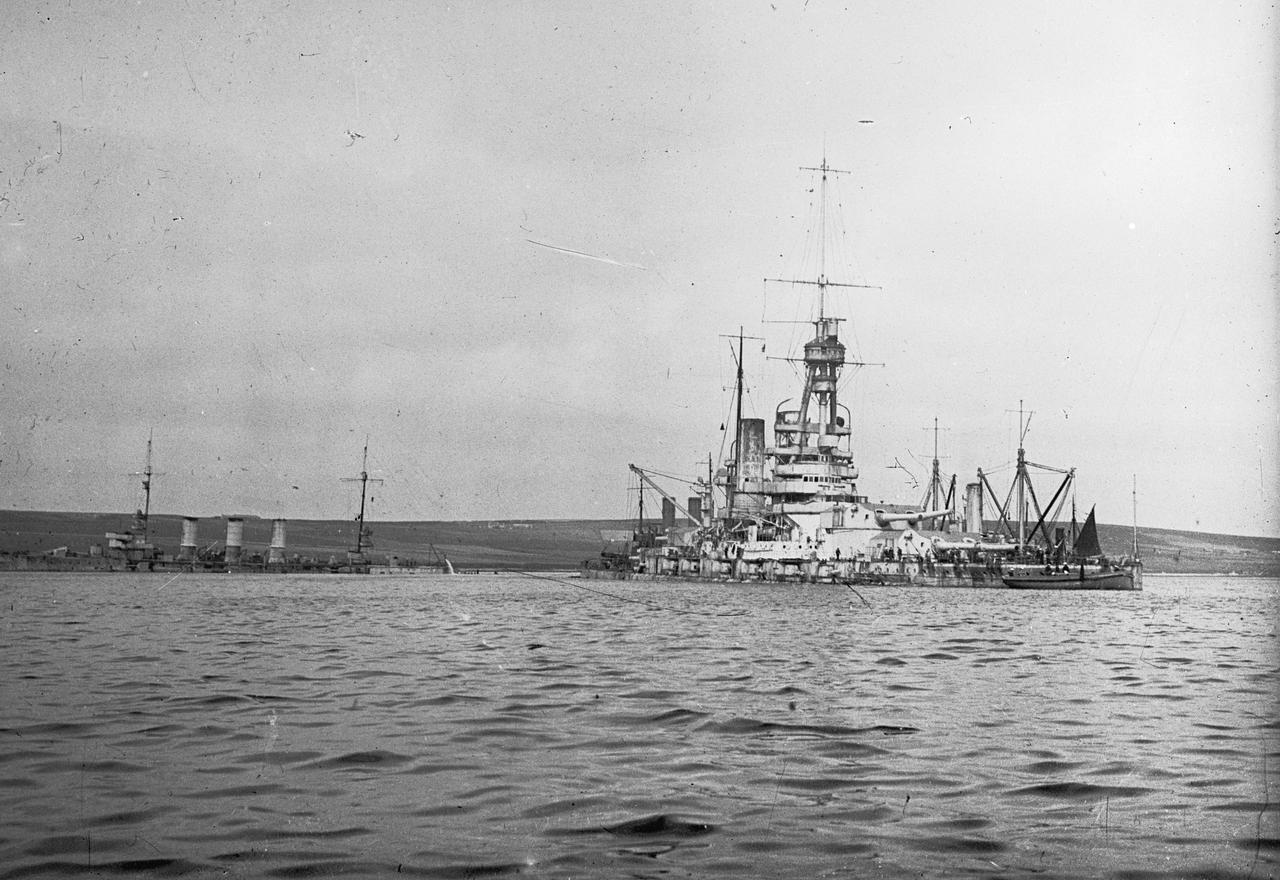
Salvage work in progress on Baden at Scapa Flow. The cruiser Frankfurt is also in view.

As the fleet flagship, Baden was to have taken part in a final fleet action days before the Armistice, an operation which envisioned the bulk of the High Seas Fleet sortieing from their base in Wilhelmshaven to engage the British Grand Fleet. In order to obtain a better bargaining position for Germany, Admirals Hipper and Scheer intended to inflict as much damage as possible on the British navy, whatever the cost to the fleet. Consequently, on 29 October 1918, the order was given to depart from Wilhelmshaven to consolidate the fleet in the Jade roadstead, with the intention of departing the following morning. However, starting on the night of 29 October, sailors on Thüringen mutinied. Early on the 30th, the crew of Helgoland, which was directly behind Thüringen, joined in the mutiny. Both ships surrendered after two torpedo boats arrived and threatened to open fire, and the battleships' crews were taken ashore and incarcerated. The mood of Baden's crew was reported as "dangerous". The rebellion then spread ashore; on 3 November, an estimated 20,000 sailors, dock workers, and civilians fought a battle against the authorities in Kiel in an attempt to secure the release of the jailed mutineers. Meanwhile, on 9 November, the Socialists' red flag was hoisted aboard Baden, which finally convinced Hipper and Scheer to abandon the plan.

Baden was not originally intended to be surrendered under the terms of the Armistice, but was substituted for the battlecruiser Mackensen, which lay incomplete and could not put to sea. As a result, instead of joining the High Seas Fleet when it departed for Scapa Flow on 21 November 1918, Baden left Germany on 7 January 1919, and after arriving, most of her crew were taken off the by the light cruiser Regensburg to be returned to Germany. The Royal Navy inspected the ship on 9 January, but many of the technical instruments, including gunnery equipment, had been removed before the ship left Germany. The fleet remained in captivity during the negotiations in Versailles that ultimately produced the treaty that ended the war. A copy of The Times informed Rear Admiral Ludwig von Reuter that the Armistice was to expire at noon on 21 June 1919, the deadline by which Germany was to have signed the peace treaty. Reuter came to the conclusion that the British intended to seize the German ships after the Armistice expired. (Note: By this time, the Armistice had been extended to 23 June, though there is some contention as to whether Reuter was aware of this. Admiral Sydney Fremantle stated that he informed Reuter on the evening of the 20th, though Reuter claims he was unaware of the development. For Fremantle's claim, see Bennett, p. 307. For Reuter's statement, see Herwig, p. 256.) To prevent this, he decided to scuttle his ships at the first opportunity. On the morning of 21 June, the British fleet left Scapa Flow to conduct training maneuvers; at 11:20 Reuter transmitted the order to his ships.

Many of the men aboard Baden had been selected to help unload a supply ship that morning and so were unavailable to open the seacocks, leaving the remaining crewmen insufficient for the task. As a result, Baden was the last major warship to begin the scuttling process, and British forces in the harbor managed to secure the ship, cut her anchor chains, and run her aground before she could sink in deeper water. Then-Lieutenant Commander Bruce Fraser led the British sailors who boarded Baden. Baden was the only capital ship not successfully sunk in the scuttling. The ship was refloated on 19 July, after which she was towed to the British naval base at Invergordon.

=== British service ===
Baden being towed from Scapa Flow

After the ship arrived in Invergordon, Baden was carefully examined by Royal Navy technicians. Naval engineers inspected the hull, including the screws, bilge keels, and rudders, to determine the water resistance of the hull form. The ship was found to have been approximately as efficient as the British Revenge-class battleships. The ship's armor system was extensively investigated; the British team concluded that the ship had not been modified to incorporate the lessons from the Battle of Jutland of 31 May – 1 June 1916.

The main battery turrets and ammunition magazines were also the subject of intense scrutiny; among the tests conducted was a trial to see how fast the magazines could be flooded—the result was 12 minutes. (Note: In case of an ammunition fire, magazines were fitted to be flooded so as to prevent a catastrophic explosion.) The gunnery school HMS Excellent ran loading trials on the main battery guns. It was found that the guns could be prepared to fire in 23 seconds, 13 seconds faster than in the Queen Elizabeth-class battleships. The ship's watertight bulkhead and underwater protection systems also particularly interested the inspection team; they paid close attention to the ship's pumping and counter-flooding equipment. Early in the inspection, a dockyard worker was killed and several others injured after a candle ignited fumes in the hull, causing an explosion. Edmund Abbott, a Royal Navy lieutenant, was awarded the Albert Medal for his attempts to rescue the injured.

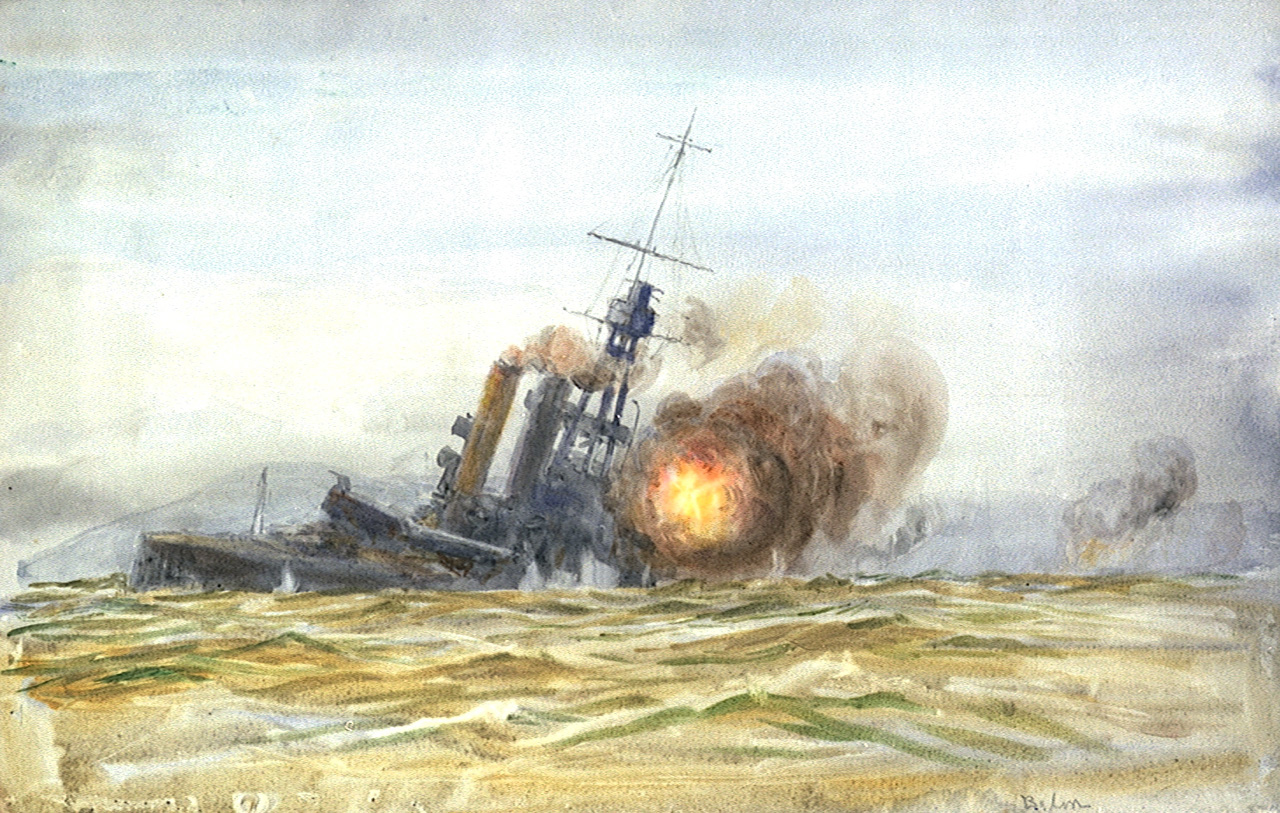
Baden sinking as a target ship, 16 August 1921. Painting by William Lionel Wyllie.

After the inspection was concluded, it was determined to expend Baden as a gunnery target. In January 1921 the first round of gunnery tests was ordered. The gunners at HMS Excellent fired the new armor-piercing (AP) shells that had been introduced after the Battle of Jutland. This round of tests was used to determine the most efficient ratio of explosives in the detonator caps; the shells fired at Jutland had a tendency to fragment when striking heavy armor rather than penetrate. The monitor HMS Terror moored some 500 yd (460 m) away from Baden to fire her 15 in (38 cm) guns from point-blank range. Baden was made to list to starboard by the removal of coal and armor from the port side, to simulate the effect of a shell striking armor from a plunging angle. The forward-most gun turret had by this time been removed. Terror fired 17 shells of various types into the ship. The Royal Navy concluded after these tests that the new shells were sufficiently powerful to penetrate heavy armor and were much more effective than the previous versions that had been employed at Jutland. Following the tests, heavy seas caused the ship to sink in the shallow water; after three months she was again raised and docked for repairs. The ship was readied for a second round of testing by August 1921.

The second series of tests was scheduled for 16 August 1921. The monitor HMS Erebus fired a mix of shell types into Baden with her 15 in guns. This time, the shells did not perform as well against Baden's heavy armor; one of the AP shells failed to explode and two semi-AP shells appear to have broken up on impact. Six aerial bombs were also detonated on the ship, though they had been placed on board and were detonated remotely. The bombs did not perform as well as had been expected. Immediately following the second round of gunnery trials, Baden was scuttled. The ship sank in Hurd Deep in a depth of approximately 180 m (600 ft). The ship's bell was retained by the Royal Navy and is now a piece in the Imperial War Museum's collection.

The most important finding of the trials on Baden was that the 7-inch (18 cm) thick medium armor was completely useless against large-caliber shells. As a result, the British navy adopted the "all or nothing" armor pioneered by the United States Navy. The "all or nothing" armor theory consisted of protecting the ship's vitals with extremely heavy armor, while leaving the rest of the ship completely unprotected. This system was used on Britain's first post-war class of battleships, the Nelson class.
