= SMS Württemberg (1917) =

Battleship of the German Imperial Navy

- Bayern; Württemberg would have resembled this ship

History

German Empire
- Name: SMS Württemberg
- Namesake: Württemberg
- Builder: AG Vulcan, Hamburg
- Laid down: 4 January 1915
- Launched: 20 June 1917
- Stricken: 3 November 1919
- Fate: Broken up, 1921

General characteristics
- Class & type: Bayern-class battleship
- Displacement: Normal: 28,800 t (28,300 long tons); Full load: 32,500 t (32,000 long tons)
- Length: 182.4 m (598 ft 5 in) loa
- Beam: 30 m (98 ft 5 in)
- Draft: 9.3 to 9.4 m (30 ft 6 in to 30 ft 10 in)
- Installed power: 12 × water-tube boilers; 48,000 metric horsepower (47,000 shp)
- Propulsion: 3 × steam turbines; 3 × screw propellers
- Speed: 22 knots (41 km/h; 25 mph)
- Range: 5,000 nmi (9,300 km; 5,800 mi) at 12 knots (22 km/h; 14 mph)
- Complement: 42 officers; 1,129 enlisted men
- Armament: 8 × 38 cm (15 in) SK L/45 guns; 16 × 15 cm (5.9 in) SK L/45 guns; 4 × 8.8 cm (3.5 in) SK L/45 guns; 5 × 60 cm (23.6 in) torpedo tubes
- Armor: Belt: 170 to 350 mm (6.7 to 13.8 in); Conning tower: 400 mm (15.7 in); Deck: 60 to 100 mm (2.4 to 3.9 in); Turrets: 200 to 350 mm (7.9 to 13.8 in)

SMS Württemberg was the fourth and final member of the Bayern-class dreadnought battleships ordered but never finished for the German Kaiserliche Marine (Imperial Navy) in the 1910s, sometimes considered to be part of a sub-class with her sister Sachsen. She was to be armed with the same main battery of eight 38 cm (15 in) guns in four gun turrets. Originally intended to serve as a fleet flagship, the start of World War I in July 1914 forced the Navy to simplify her design in the hopes that she could be completed in time to see service during the conflict. She was laid down in January 1915 at the AG Vulcan shipyard, but as resources were diverted to more pressing projects, including U-boat construction, work on the ship slowed; she was launched in June 1917, but only to clear the slipway for other work. By the time construction stopped, she was about twelve months from completion. The Treaty of Versailles that ended the war in June 1919 specified that all warships under construction in Germany were to be destroyed, and Württemberg was accordingly sold for scrap in 1921 and dismantled the following year.

== Development ==
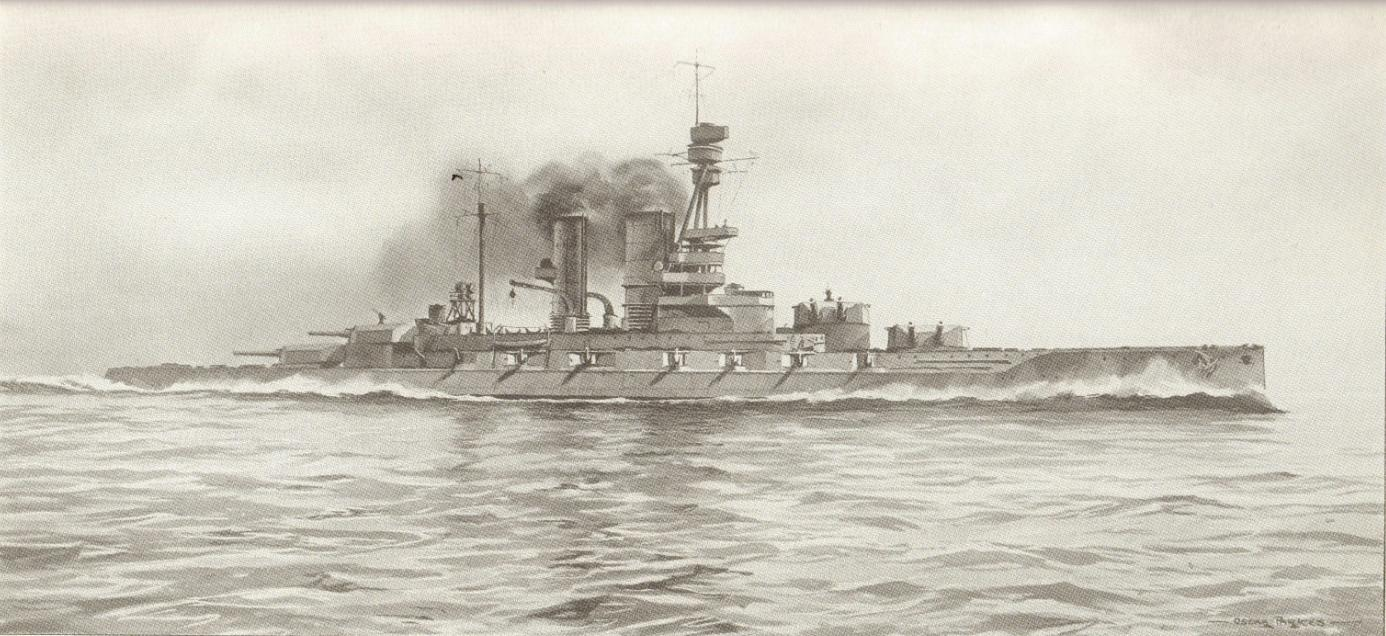
Recognition drawing of a Bayern-class battleship

Design work on the Bayern class began in 1910 in the context of the Anglo-German naval arms race, with initial discussions focused on the caliber of the main battery; previous German battleships had carried 30.5 cm (12 in) guns, but as foreign navies adopted 34 cm (13.5 in) and 35.6 cm (14 in) weapons, the German naval command felt the need to respond with larger guns of their own. They considered 32 cm (12.6 in), 38 cm (15 in), and 40 cm (15.7 in) guns. Admiral Alfred von Tirpitz, the State Secretary of the Reichsmarineamt (RMA—Imperial Naval Office), was able to use public outcry over the Agadir Crisis to pressure the Reichstag (Imperial Diet) into appropriating additional funds for the Kaiserliche Marine (Imperial Navy) to offset the additional cost of the larger weapons. The design staff settled on the 38 cm caliber since the 40 cm was significantly more expensive and the 38 cm gun marked a significant improvement over existing German guns. The class was authorized under the fourth and final Naval Law, which was passed in 1912.

As work on the first two units of the class—Bayern and Baden—began, the design staff examined the latest developments in foreign warships and learned that the latest British battleships, the Queen Elizabeth class, would have a high top speed. This prompted them to alter the third member of the class, Sachsen, to include a diesel engine. Sachsen's length increased to accommodate the larger engine, increasing displacement by about 200 t (197 long tons) over the earlier members of the class. As work began on Württemberg, the last member of the class, the designers intended to retain the increased dimensions while reverting to an all-steam turbine arrangement. The savings in weight would be used to improve Württemberg's armor layout. This proved to be impossible, because the decision was made to outfit the new vessel as a fleet flagship, and the larger bridge necessary for an admiral's staff more than offset the reduction in weight. Indeed, the alterations forced the design staff to increase standard displacement by another 200 t. Cost of the new ships spiraled higher and higher; Württemberg amounted to an 8.6 percent increase over Sachsen, which was in turn a 13 percent increase over the estimated costs for Bayern and Baden.

Tirpitz presented the finalized design for the new ship to Kaiser Wilhelm II for approval in June 1914, during the Kiel Week sailing regatta, calculated to take advantage of Wilhelm's good mood to secure his approval for the skyrocketing price. Wilhelm registered no objection, but events were to rapidly force Tirpitz to rework the design. Later that month, Archduke Franz Ferdinand of Austria-Hungary was assassinated, leading to the July Crisis that started World War I in late July. On 2 August, Tirpitz issued instructions that Württemberg was to be completed as quickly as possible to strengthen the fleet now that the country was at war; the ship was to be completed identically to Sachsen, albeit without the diesel engine, discarding the modifications to her bridge structure. The contract for the ship was quickly awarded to AG Vulcan.

== Description ==
Side view of the Bayern class showing the protection scheme

Württemberg was 181.8 m (596 ft 5 in) long at the waterline, and 182.4 m (598 ft 5 in) long overall. She had a beam of 30 m (98 ft 5 in) and a draft of between 9.3–9.4 m (30 ft 6 in – 30 ft 10 in). Württemberg would have displaced 28,800 metric tons (28,300 long tons) at her designed displacement, which did not include a full load of supplies, fuel, and other operational necessities; at full load, she would have displaced up to 32,500 metric tons (32,000 long tons). Though her sister Sachsen was to receive a diesel engine, Württemberg reverted to an all-steam turbine propulsion system like her earlier sisters. Steam for the engines was provided by nine coal-fired and three oil-burning water-tube boilers. The propulsion system was rated to produce 48,000 metric horsepower (47,000 shp) for a maximum speed of 22 knots (41 km/h; 25 mph). Her engines would have provided a cruising range of 5,000 nautical miles (9,300 km; 5,800 mi) at a speed of 12 knots (22 km/h; 14 mph). Upon commissioning, she would have carried a crew of 42 officers and 1,129 enlisted men.

Had she been completed, the ship would have been armed with eight 38 cm (15 in) SK L/45 guns. (Note: In Imperial German Navy gun nomenclature, "SK" (Schnelladekanone) denotes that the gun is quick loading, while the L/45 denotes the length of the gun. In this case, the L/45 gun is 45 calibers, meaning that the gun is 45 times as long as it is in bore diameter.) These would have been arranged in four twin-gun turrets: two superfiring turret pairs fore and aft of the superstructure. Her secondary armament was to have consisted of sixteen 15 cm (5.9 in) guns and four 8.8 cm (3.5 in) guns. She would also have been fitted with five 60 cm (23.6 in) torpedo tubes submerged in her hull, one in the bow and two on each broadside. The ship had an armored belt that was 170–350 mm (6.7–13.8 in) thick and an armored deck that was 60–100 mm (2.4–3.9 in) thick. Her forward conning tower had 400 mm (15.7 in) sides, and the main battery turrets had 350 mm thick sides and 200 mm (7.9 in) thick roofs.

== Construction and cancellation ==
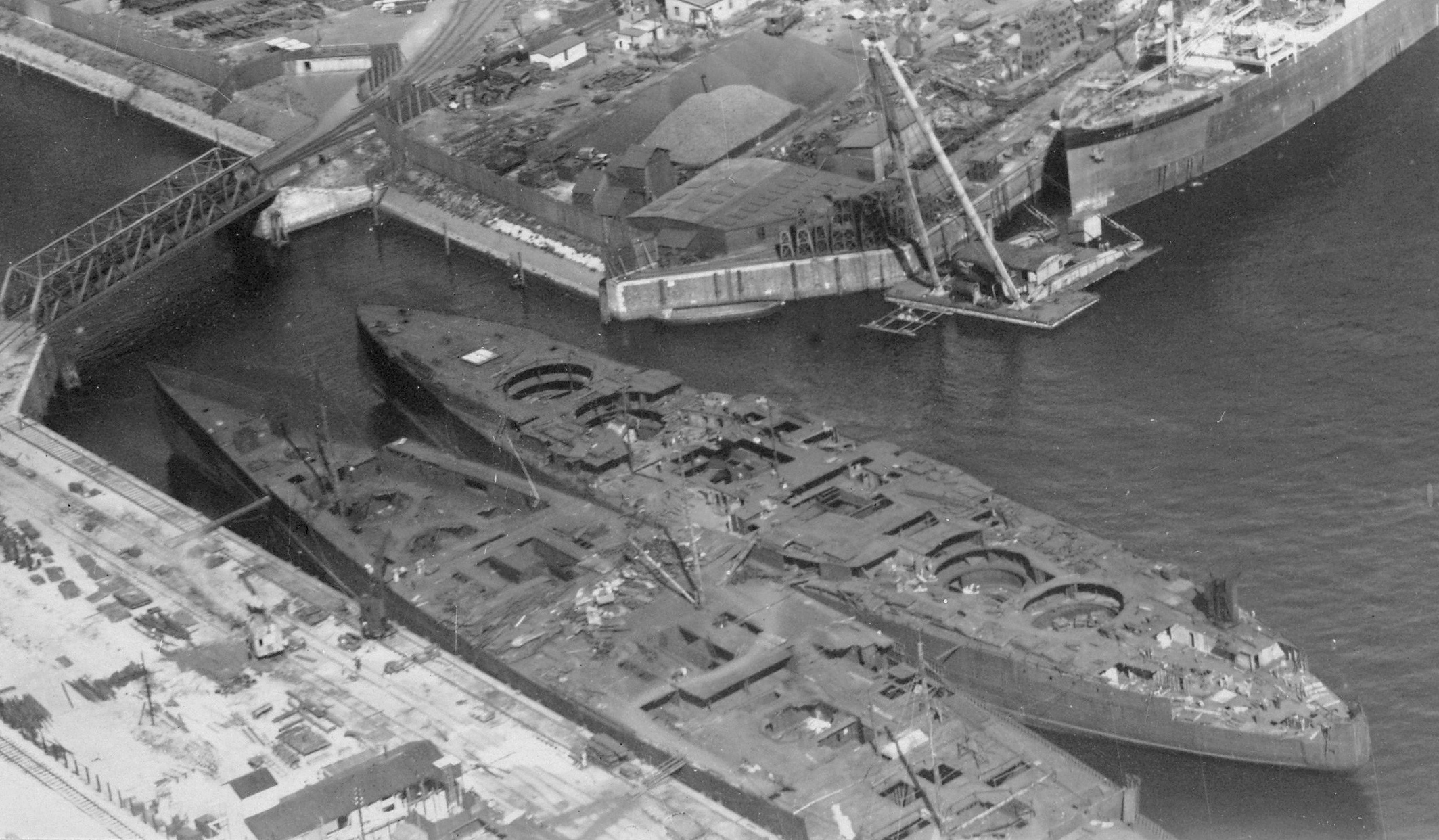
Unfinished battleship Württemberg (right) and the Mackensen-class battlecruiser Prinz Eitel Friedrich in Hamburg after the war, in about 1920

Württemberg, ordered under the provisional name Ersatz Kaiser Wilhelm II to replace the old pre-dreadnought Kaiser Wilhelm II, (Note: German warships were ordered under provisional names. Additions to the fleet were given a single letter; ships intended to replace older or lost vessels were ordered as "Ersatz (name of the ship to be replaced)".) was named for the earlier ironclad corvette Württemberg, which had been built in the 1870s. The ship had been scheduled for the 1915 fiscal year, but due to the start of the war, she was begun early using war funds. The contract that had been awarded to AG Vulcan was finalized on 29 December 1914, which specified the beginning of construction in January 1915, her launching in mid-1916, and completion in early 1917. Her keel was laid down in Hamburg on 4 January 1915 under yard number 386, and AG Vulcan intended to rush work on the ship as much as possible. But as resources and manpower were diverted to other, more pressing projects like the U-boat campaign against Britain, work on the ship slowed.

By December 1915, about 31 percent of her hull had been completed, which amounted to 60 percent of her outer hull plating below the waterline, 75 percent of her inner bottom, and 50 percent of her lower decks and bulkheads below the armor deck. Work on assembling her propulsion system had begun in the workshop alongside the slipway, as had the manufacturing of her armor plate. Further work on the hull proceeded more slowly in 1916, and her launching date was repeatedly delayed until she finally was ready to exit the slipway on 20 June 1917, a year behind schedule. By that time, there was no intention to complete the ship, and her launching was primarily intended to clear the slipway for other projects.

After Germany resumed and greatly expanded the unrestricted submarine warfare campaign in February 1917, Admiral Eduard von Capelle, who had by then replaced Tirpitz as the head of the RMA, argued that capital ship construction should be halted in favor of U-boat construction. The RMA filed a report dated 1 February 1918, which stated that capital ship construction had stopped, primarily due to the shifting priorities to the U-boat war. When work stopped on Württemberg altogether, she was about twelve months from completion. The eight 38 cm guns that had been manufactured for Württemberg were instead converted into railway guns or fixed batteries in Flanders. The incomplete vessel was still in AG Vulcan's possession at the end of the war in November 1918. According to Article 186 of the Treaty of Versailles, signed in June 1919, all German surface warships under construction were to be immediately broken up for scrap. Württemberg was accordingly stricken from the naval register on 3 November 1919 and sold to ship breakers in 1921, thereafter being dismantled in Hamburg.
