= Semide =

- Commune
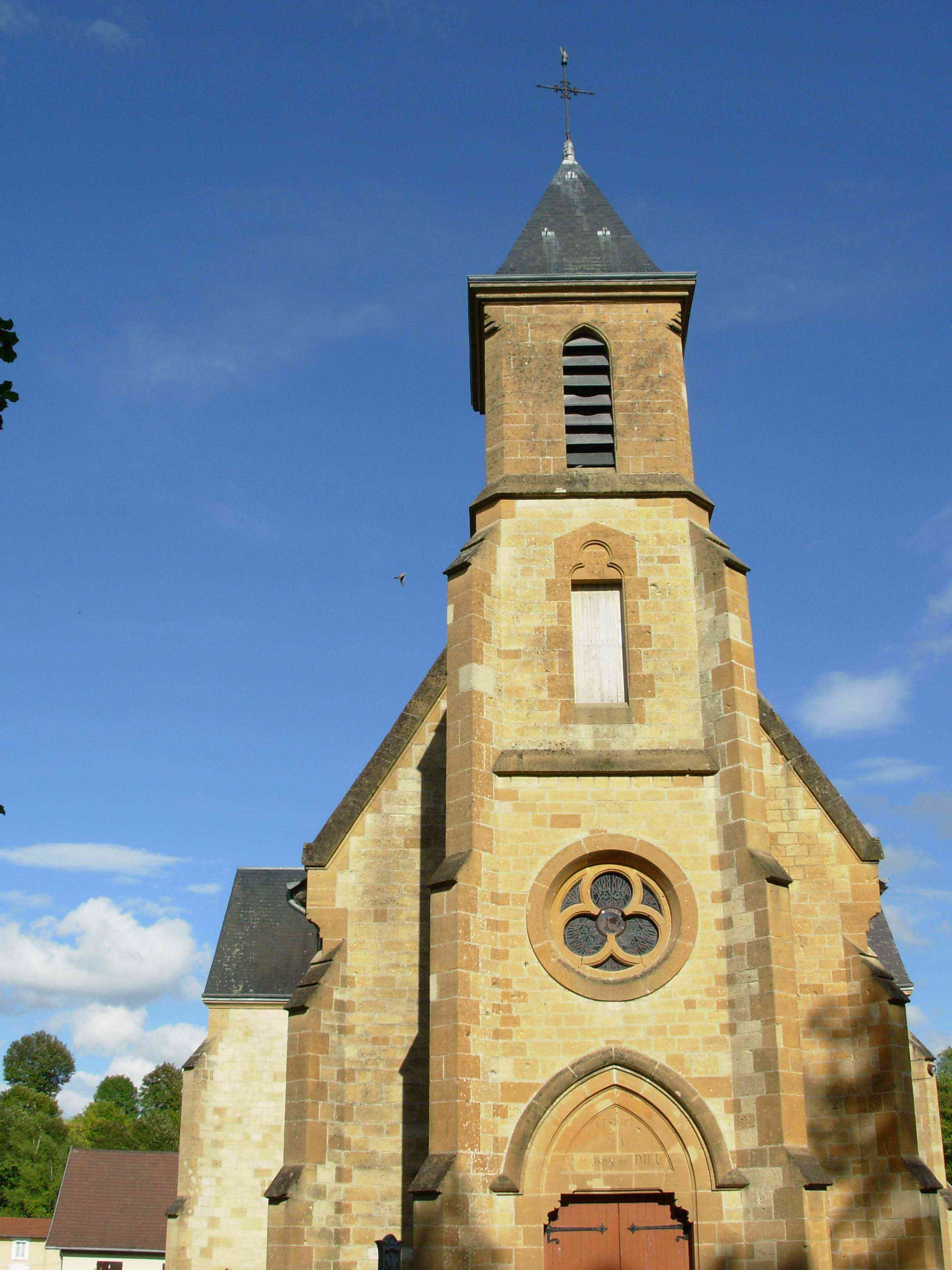
- The church in Semide

- Coat of arms
- Location of Semide
- Location within France Location within Grand Est
- Coordinates: 49°20′30″N 4°35′01″E
- Country: France
- Region: Grand Est
- Department: Ardennes
- Arrondissement: Vouziers
- Canton: Attigny
- Intercommunality: Argonne Ardennaise

Government
  - Mayor (2020–2026): Hubert Oudin
- Area^{1}: 37.04 km^{2} (14.30 sq mi)
- Elevation: 149 m (489 ft)
- Highest elevation: 204 m (669 ft)
- Lowest elevation: 110 m (360 ft)
- Population (2023): 174
  - Density: 4.70/km^{2} (12.2/sq mi)
- Time zone: UTC+01:00 (CET)
  - Summer (DST): UTC+02:00 (CEST)
- INSEE/Postal code: 08410 /08400
- ^{1} French Land Register data, which excludes lakes, ponds, glaciers > 1 km^{2} (0.386 sq mi or 247 acres) and river estuaries.

Semide is a commune in the Ardennes department in the Grand Est region in northern of France.

It is located 200 km (120 mi) northeast of Paris, 40 km (25 mi) of Reims.

== History ==
Semide has not always been what it is today. Formerly, the chalky soil gave bad harvest. This poor land, where resinous had been plant under the Second Empire provided to the sheep kine sparse grass. In the 1960s, Semide underwent a change which has modified its economy, its way of life and the landscape. Mecanisation, motorisation, clearing, fertilizer utilization and regrouping of lands mark out the intensive farming beginning dominates by cereals.

== Population ==
Historical population
Year	Pop.	±% p.a.
1968	293	—
1975	251	−2.19%
1982	264	+0.72%
1990	258	−0.29%
1999	245	−0.57%
2007	213	−1.73%
2012	200	−1.25%
2017	190	−1.02%
2023	174	−1.46%
Source: INSEE

The inhabitants are called Semidas in French.

== Sights ==
- St-Pierre St-Paul Church from the twelfth century.
- Big Bertha : Vestige of an installation of a Langer Max (officially called 38 cm SKL/45), wrongly called by usage Big Bertha.
- National graveyard from the First World War.

== Economy ==
Semide main's activity is farming, predominantly cereal and sugar beet production.

== See also ==
- Communes of the Ardennes department
