= 38 cm SK L/45 gun =

38 cm SK L/45 "Max"
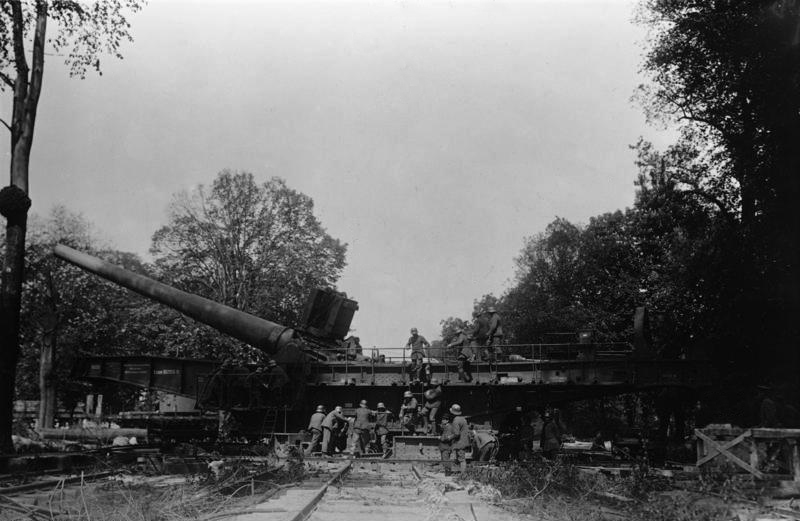
- "Max" mounted on its combined railroad and firing platform
- Type: Naval gun Railroad gun
- Place of origin: German Empire

Service history
- In service: 1915–1918
- Used by: German Empire
- Wars: World War I

Production history
- Designer: Krupp
- Designed: 1912–1914
- Manufacturer: Krupp
- Produced: 1914–1918
- No. built: > 28
- Variants: B, E, E.u.B.

Specifications
- Mass: 267.9 tonnes (263.7 long tons; 295.3 short tons)
- Length: 31.61 metres (103 ft 8 in)
- Barrel length: 16.13 metres (52 ft 11 in) L/45
- Shell: separate-loading, cased charge
- Calibre: 38 centimetres (15 in)
- Breech: horizontal sliding-block
- Recoil: hydro-pneumatic
- Carriage: 2 × 5-axle and 2 × 4-axle bogies
- Elevation: +0° to +18.5° (+55° if emplaced)
- Traverse: 2° (up to 360° if emplaced)
- Muzzle velocity: 800–1,040 m/s (2,600–3,400 ft/s)
- Effective firing range: 22,200 metres (72,800 ft) (from rails)
- Maximum firing range: 47,500 metres (155,800 ft) (if emplaced)

The 38 cm SK L/45 "Max", also called Langer Max (literal translation "Long Max") was a German long-range, heavy siege and coast-defense gun used during the First World War. (Note: In Imperial German Navy gun nomenclature, "SK" (German: Schnelladekanone) denotes that the gun is quick firing, while the L/45 denotes the length of the gun. In this case, the L/45 gun is 45 calibers, meaning that the gun is 45 times as long as it is in diameter.) Originally a naval gun, it was also adapted for land service when it became clear that some of the ships for which it was intended would be delayed and that it would be very useful on the Western Front.

The first guns saw service in fixed positions (for example at Verdun in February 1916) but the lengthy preparation time required for the concrete emplacements was a serious problem and a railroad mount was designed to increase the gun's mobility. The latter variants participated in the 1918 German spring offensives and the Second Battle of the Marne. One gun, Batterie Pommern, was captured in Koekelare (16 October 1918) by the Belgians at the end of the war and the seven surviving guns were destroyed in 1921 and 1922.

== Design ==
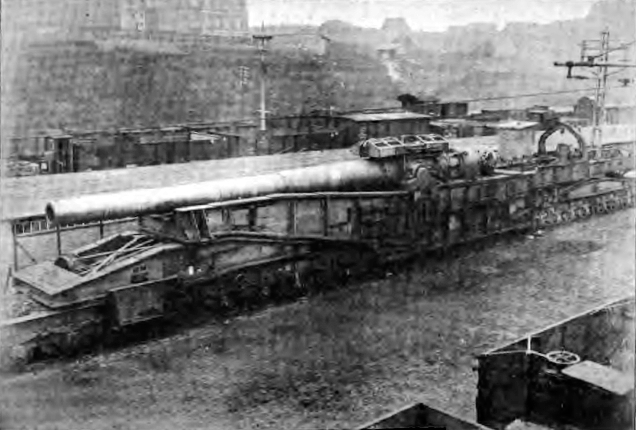
"Max" in travelling mode. The ammunition hoist is visible at the rear of the mount.

They were originally designed as the main armament of the Bayern-class battleships but were deployed in fixed (Anschiessgerüst) and semi-portable (Bettungsgerüst) concrete emplacements that took weeks to build. One obvious change made for land service was the placement of a large folding counterweight just forward of the trunnions to counteract the preponderance of weight towards the breech. This, although heavy, was simpler than adding equilibrators to perform the same function. It folded to lower the gun's height while travelling.

To meet the demand for more mobility and a faster emplacement time, Krupp designed a combination railroad and firing platform mounting (Eisenbahn und Bettungsgerüst - E. u. B.) at the end of 1917 using guns released by the hulking of SMS Sachsen and SMS Württemberg. This mount allowed the gun to fire from any suitable section of track and from a fixed emplacement. The E. u. B. mount used a combination of cradle and rolling recoil systems to absorb the recoil forces when firing from rails. It could traverse a total of 2° for fine aiming adjustments, coarser adjustments had to be made by moving the carriage. The gun had to be loaded at zero elevation and so had to be re-aimed for every shot. One major problem when firing from rails was that the lengthy recoil movement of the gun prevented elevation past 18° 30' lest the breech hit the ground when firing, which limited range to 22.2 kilometres (13.8 mi). Nicknamed Max, the gun's (supporting) barrel and railway-transportable carriage was used in the famed Paris Gun. Some guns were also emplaced in the Pommern (Koekelare) and Deutschland coastal defence batteries on the Flanders coast protecting occupied Ostend.

The first fixed emplacements (Betonbettung) used concrete and required a month or more to build. The Germans began construction of some during the winter of 1917–1918 in preparation for their Spring Offensive. From May 1918 they used a removable steel box (Bettung mit Eisenunterbau) in lieu of the concrete that shortened the construction time, although the exact amount is unknown. Miller quotes three weeks as the time necessary to build the steel version from captured German manuals. The emplacement consisted of a central rotating platform, the main approach track and two auxiliary tracks on each side for the gantry crane necessary to assemble the emplacement, and an outer circular track to handle the ammunition. The central platform had railroad track on one axis and the actual firing mount on the other. All that was necessary to emplace the E. u. B. mount was to center it on the platform, jack it up, remove the trucks, and rotate the platform 90° and lower the mount to be bolted to the platform.

== Ammunition ==
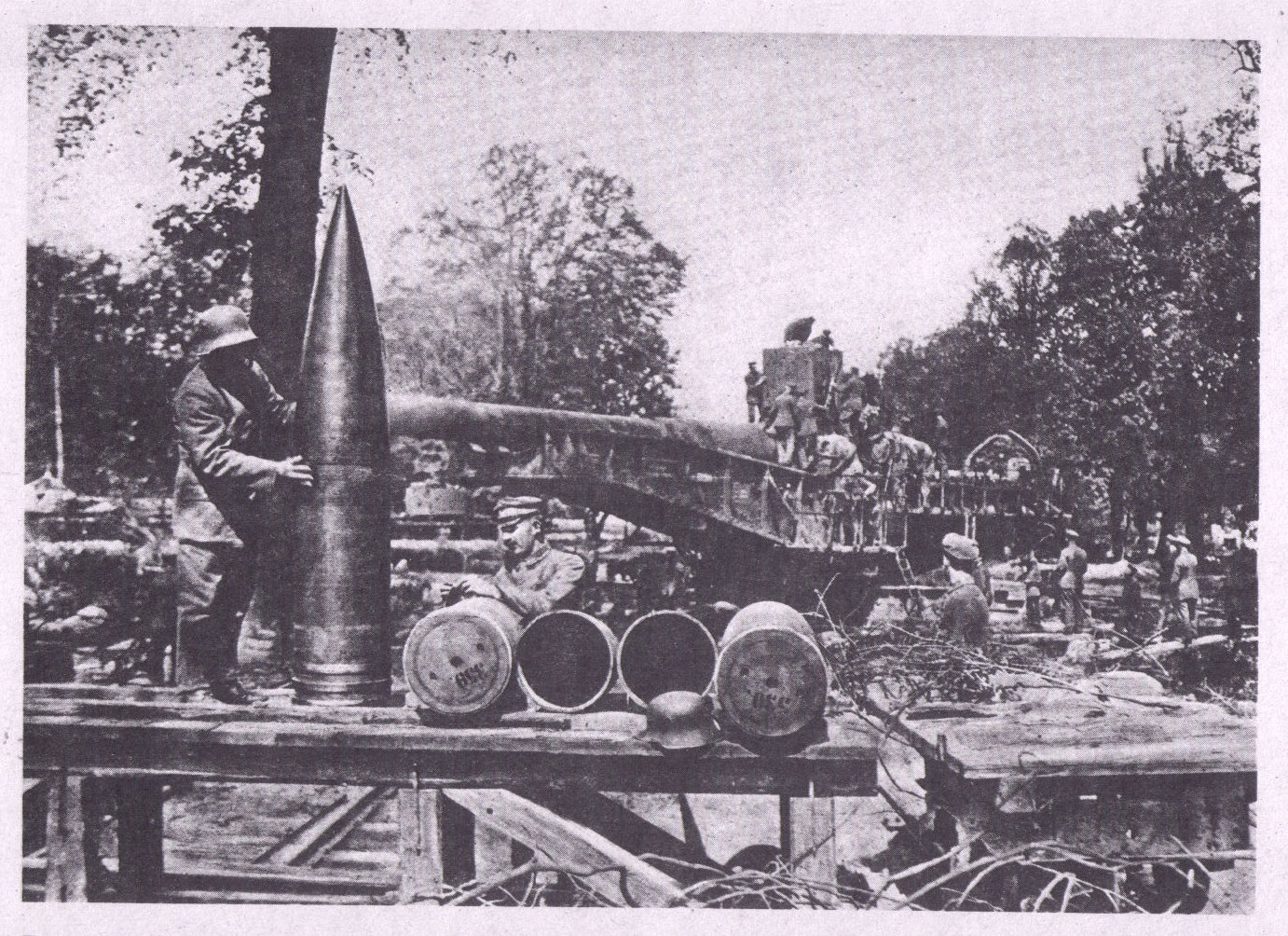
38 cm ammunition

When used as a rolling mount, an extension of the carriage was fitted over the rear trucks to allow the ammunition car behind the mount to place ammunition on the shot truck which was then manually run up to the breech for loading. In an emplacement this extension was removed and ammunition hoisted up through a hatch on the floor of the mount, between the shot truck rails, from an ammunition car on the outer track and then lowered onto the shot truck. An estimated twelve men were required to ram the shell. It used the German naval system of ammunition where the base charge was held in a metallic cartridge case and supplemented by another charge in a silk bag which was rammed first. The existence of a shell with 55 kilometres (34 mi) range must be regarded as unconfirmed, the longest engagement recorded for any of these guns was 44 kilometres (27 mi) during the bombardment of Dunkerque by Batterie Pommern in Flanders in 1917–1918.

Ammunition types
Shell name	Weight	Filling weight	Muzzle velocity	Range
Base-fused high-explosive shell (Sprenggranate L/4.1 m. Bdz.)	750 kg (1,650 lb)	67 kg (148 lb) (HE)	800 m/s (2,600 ft/s)	34,200 m (112,200 ft)
Base-fused HE shell with ballistic cap (Sprenggranate L/5.4 m. Bdz. [mit Haube])	743 kg (1,638 lb)	62 kg (137 lb) (HE)	800–890 m/s (2,600–2,900 ft/s)	38,700 m (127,000 ft)
Shrapnel shell (Stschr L/3.4)	750 kg (1,650 lb)	6.7 kg (15 lb) (HE)	—	22,600 m (74,100 ft)
Light base- and nose-fused HE shell with ballistic cap (leichte Sprgr m. Bdz. u. Kz. [mit Haube])	400 kg (880 lb)	31 kg (68 lb) (HE)	1,040 m/s (3,400 ft/s)	47,500 m (155,800 ft)
HE shell with ballistic cap (Sprenggranate L/4.4 [mit Haube])	—	—	—	55,000 m (180,000 ft)

== Combat history ==
The guns were used as heavy siege guns on the Western Front, and the first salvo from two of these guns commenced the first great German artillery bombardment beginning the Battle of Verdun. Only one gun was transferred to the Army where it equipped Saxon Battery (Sächsische Batterie) 1015. This unit fired 141 shots from Bézu-Saint-Germain beginning on 15 July 1918. The navy retained the rest of the guns and operated them in support of the army. Three "Max" guns participated in the 1918 German spring offensives and two bombarded the French during the Second Battle of the Marne. One gun was found abandoned in a railway station west of Brussels in November 1918 by the Belgian Army but the seven others were evacuated to Germany before the Armistice where they were to be emplaced on coast-defense duties. All seven were destroyed by the Military Inter-Allied Commission of Control during 1921–1922. The Belgians sold their gun to the French in 1924 for experimental purposes. It was captured by the Germans after the French surrender in 1940 but does not appear to have been used by them. One gun was captured by the Australians during the battle which began on 8 August 1918. This gun was later presented to the city of Amiens by General Sir John Monash. There was also a second, smaller, gun (a 28 cm SK L/40 "Bruno") captured by 31 Battalion AIF on 8 August 1918 along the Villers-Bretonneux front, the barrel of which now is mounted on display outside the Australian War Memorial in Canberra, Australia.

== Today ==
In October 2014 a new museum called Lange Max Museum dedicated to the "Long Max" in Koekelare opened. The main subject of the museum is Batterie Pommern, a German 38 cm SK L/45 gun. Besides the museum, one may still visit the remains of the artillery platform.

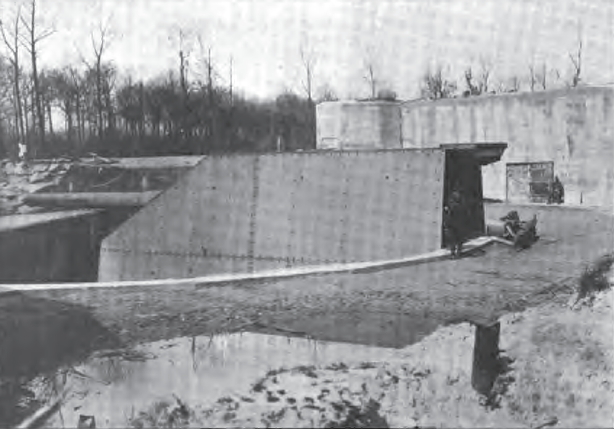
'Long Max' in Koekelare biggest gun of the world in 1917.

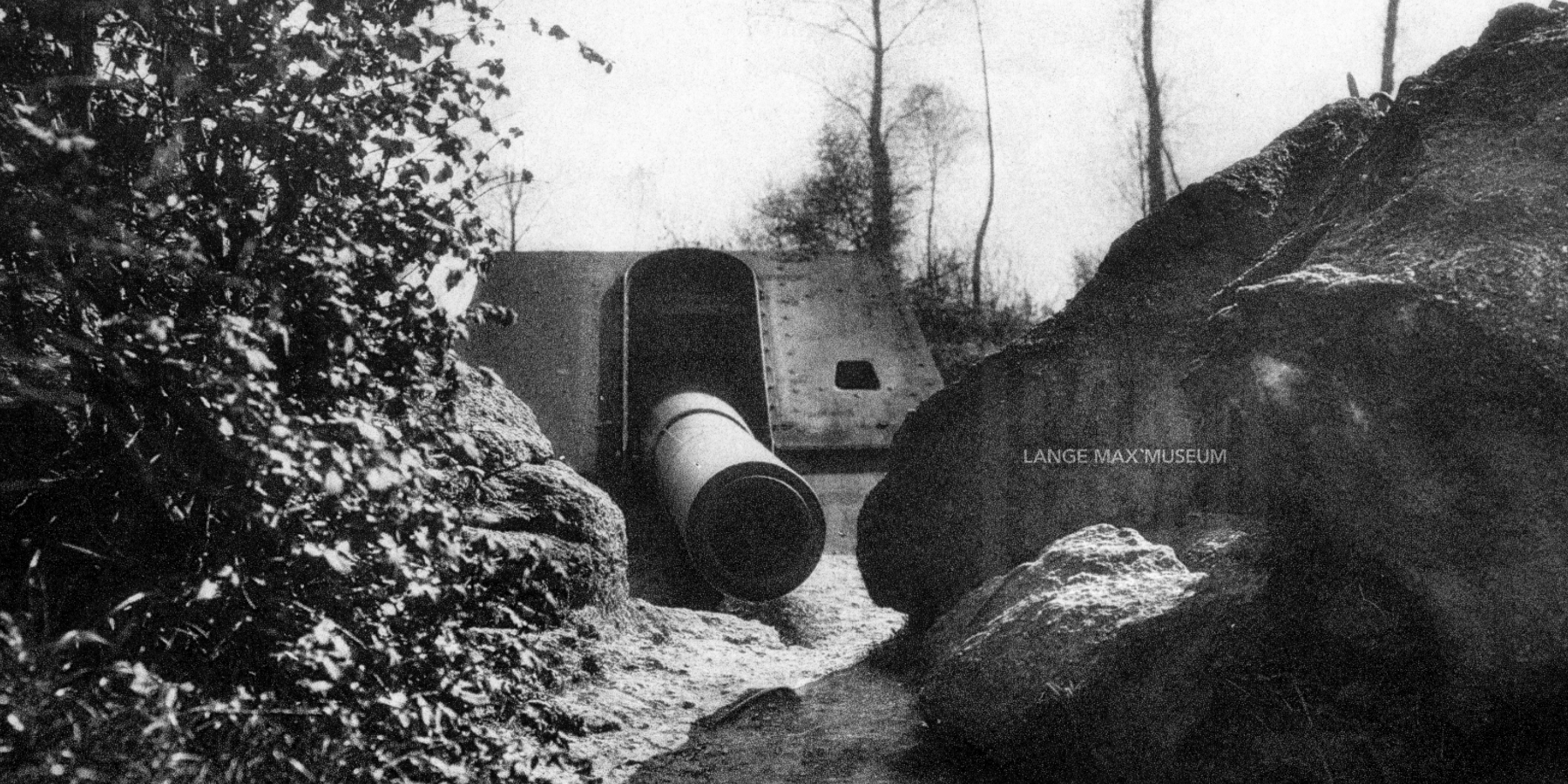
Long Max (also known as Leugenboom gun) in Koekelare.

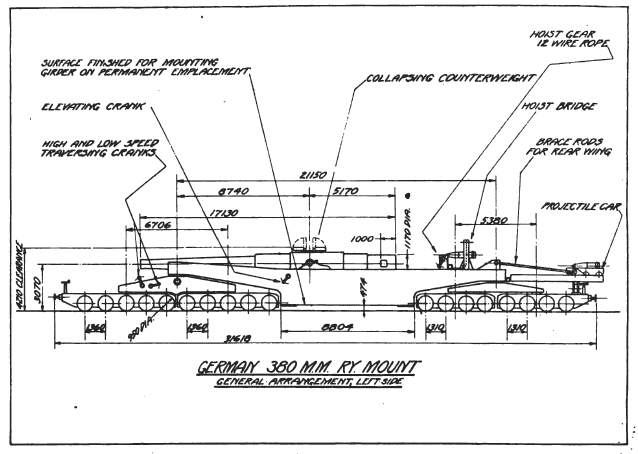
Diagram of a E. u. B. mount

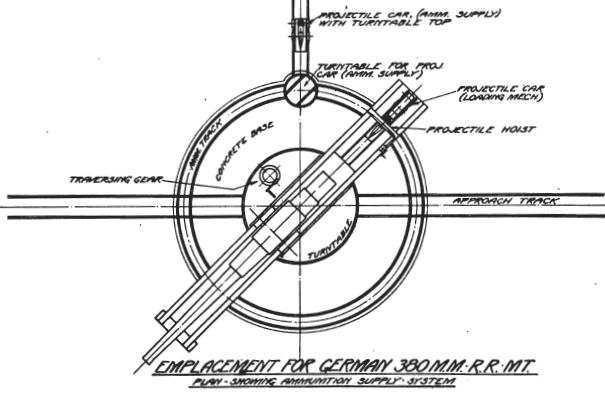
Plan view of a Bettung mit Eisenunterbau emplacement

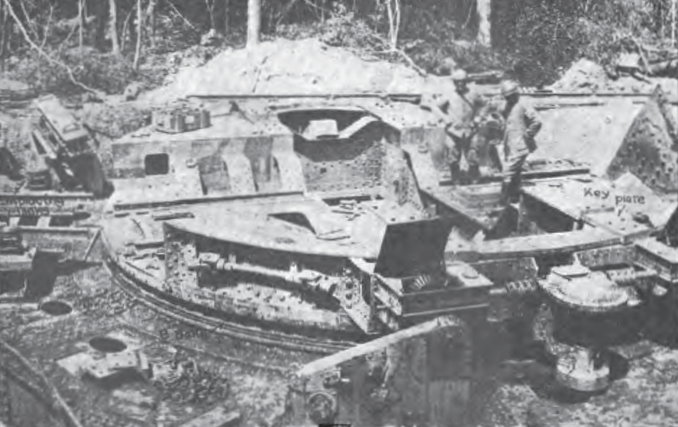
The central platform with the firing mount running from top to bottom

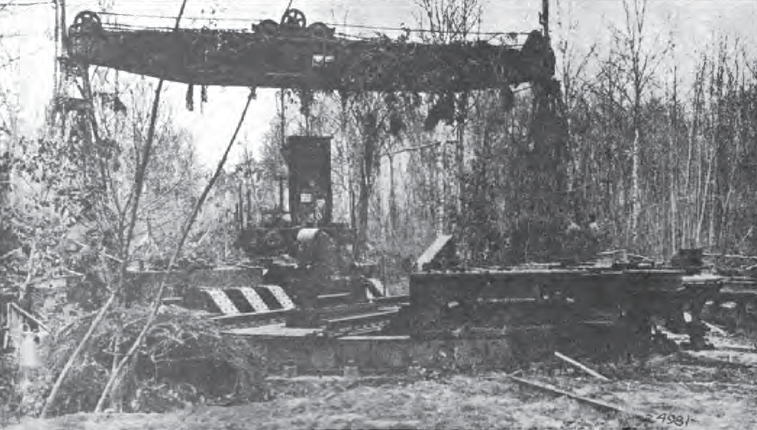
The gantry crane used to assemble the emplacement

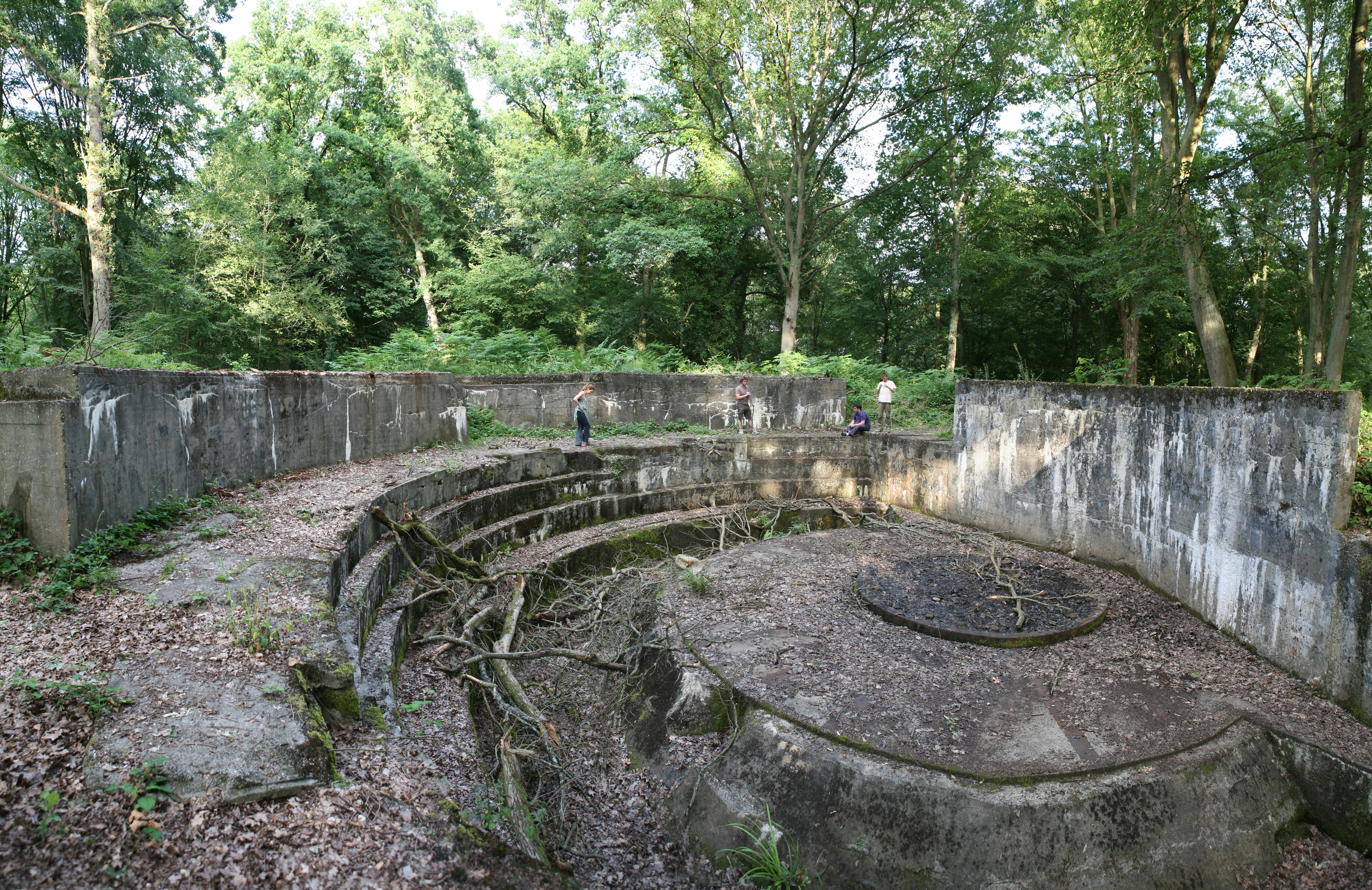
Remnants of the emplacement at Coucy

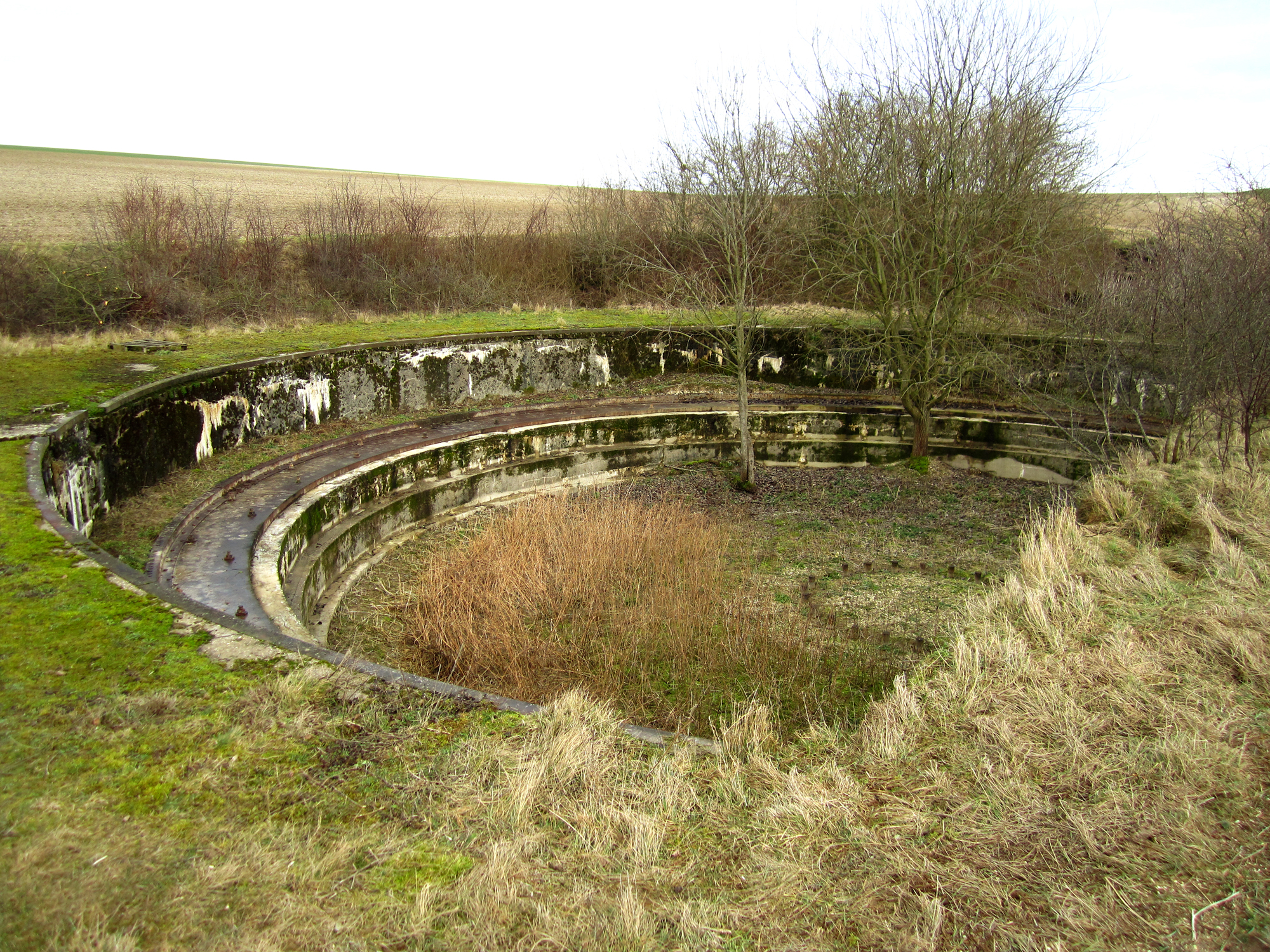
Remnants of the concrete emplacement at Semide

== See also ==
- BL 15 inch /42 naval gun - British naval counterpart
- Cannone navale da 381/40 - Italian naval and land counterpart
- BL 14 inch Railway Gun - British land counterpart
- 14"/50 calibre railway gun - US land counterpart

== Sources ==
- François, Guy. Eisenbahnartillerie: Histoire de l'artillerie lourd sur voie ferrée allemande des origines à 1945. Paris: Editions Histoire et Fortifications, 2006
- Jäger, Herbert. German Artillery of World War One. Ramsbury, Marlborough, Wiltshire: Crowood Press, 2001 ISBN 1-86126-403-8
- Kosar, Franz. Eisenbahngeschütz der Welt. Stuttgart: Motorbook, 1999 ISBN 3-613-01976-0
- Miller, H. W., Lt. Col. Railway Artillery: A Report on the Characteristics, Scope of Utility, Etc., of Railway Artillery, Volume I Washington: Government Print Office, 1921
- Schmalenbach, Paul (1983). "German Navy Large Bore Guns Operational Ashore During World War I". Warship International. XX (2): 123–153. ISSN 0043-0374.
