= SMS Sachsen (1916) =

Battleship of the German Imperial Navy

- Bayern, Sachsen's sister ship

History

German Empire
- Name: SMS Sachsen
- Namesake: Saxony
- Builder: Germaniawerft, Kiel
- Yard number: 210
- Laid down: 15 April 1914
- Launched: 21 November 1916
- Stricken: 3 November 1919
- Fate: Broken up, 1921–1923

General characteristics
- Class & type: Bayern-class battleship
- Displacement: Normal: 28,800 t (28,300 long tons); Full load: 32,500 t (32,000 long tons)
- Length: 182.4 m (598 ft 5 in) loa
- Beam: 30 m (98 ft 5 in)
- Draft: 9.3 to 9.4 m (30 ft 6 in to 30 ft 10 in)
- Installed power: 9 × water-tube boilers; 54,000 metric horsepower (53,000 shp)
- Propulsion: 2 × steam turbines; 1 × diesel engine; 3 × screw propellers
- Speed: 22.5 knots (41.7 km/h; 25.9 mph)
- Range: 5,000 nmi (9,300 km; 5,800 mi) at 12 knots (22 km/h; 14 mph)
- Complement: 42 officers; 1,129 enlisted men
- Armament: 8 × 38 cm (15 in) SK L/45 guns; 16 × 15 cm (5.9 in) SK L/45 guns; 4 × 8.8 cm (3.5 in) SK L/45 guns; 5 × 60 cm (23.6 in) torpedo tubes
- Armor: Belt: 170 to 350 mm (6.7 to 13.8 in); Conning tower: 400 mm (15.7 in); Deck: 60 to 100 mm (2.4 to 3.9 in); Turrets: 200 to 350 mm (7.9 to 13.8 in)

SMS Sachsen was the third of four dreadnought-type Bayern-class battleships built, but never finished, for the German Kaiserliche Marine (Imperial Navy) in the 1910s. This ship is sometimes considered to be part of a sub-class with her sister Württemberg. Like the other members of the class, she was to be armed with the same main battery of eight 38 cm (15 in) guns in four gun turrets, but she differed from the other members of her class in her propulsion system. She exchanged the steam turbine on her center propeller shaft in favor of a diesel engine. She was laid down in April 1914 at the Germaniawerft shipyard, but the start of World War I in July slowed work on the ship; she was launched in November 1916, but as resources were diverted to more pressing projects, including U-boat construction, work stopped completely when the ship was about nine months from completion. Some components of her propulsion system were reused in several of the Type U 151 submarines. The Treaty of Versailles that ended the war in June 1919 specified that all warships under construction in Germany were to be destroyed, and Sachsen was accordingly sold for scrap in 1920 and dismantled the following year.

== Development ==
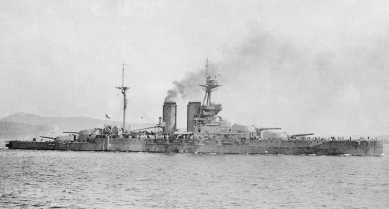
Queen Elizabeth, which prompted the revisions to Sachsen's design

Design work on the Bayern class began in 1910 in the context of the Anglo-German naval arms race, with initial discussions focused on the caliber of the main battery; previous German battleships had carried 30.5 cm (12 in) guns, but as foreign navies adopted 34 cm (13.5 in) and 35.6 cm (14 in) weapons, the German naval command felt the need to respond with larger guns of their own. They considered 32 cm (12.6 in), 38 cm (15 in), and 40 cm (15.7 in) guns. Admiral Alfred von Tirpitz, the State Secretary of the Reichsmarineamt (RMA—Imperial Naval Office), was able to use public outcry over the Agadir Crisis to pressure the Reichstag (Imperial Diet) into appropriating additional funds for the Kaiserliche Marine (Imperial Navy) to offset the additional cost of the larger weapons. The design staff settled on the 38 cm caliber since the 40 cm was significantly more expensive and the 38 cm gun marked a significant improvement over existing German guns.

As the German Navy began preparations to begin construction for the battleship of fiscal year 1914, designated "Ersatz Kaiser Friedrich III" in 1912 as a replacement for the elderly pre-dreadnought battleship Kaiser Friedrich III, (Note: German warships were ordered under provisional names. Additions to the fleet were given a single letter; ships intended to replace older or lost vessels were ordered as "Ersatz (name of the ship to be replaced)".) the design staff became aware that the latest British battleships—the Queen Elizabeth class—would have a high top speed. The Germans opted to make another attempt to incorporate a diesel engine to power the new ship's center propeller shaft (they had previously sought to install them on the earlier König class but they were not ready in time). The diesel engine was larger than a comparable turbine installation, increasing displacement by about 200 t (197 long tons), which required a lengthening of the hull by 2.4 m (7 ft 10 in) to keep her draft from increasing. This had the benefit of refining the hull lines and thereby improving its hydrodynamic shape, increasing her speed. Because of these changes, some historians, including the German naval historian Dirk Nottellmann, consider Sachsen and the fourth Bayern-class battleship, Württemberg, to constitute a sub-class of the basic Bayern design.

== Description ==
Side view of the Bayern class showing the protection scheme

Sachsen was 181.8 m (596 ft 5 in) long at the waterline, and 182.4 m (598 ft 5 in) long overall. She had a beam of 30 m (98 ft 5 in) and a draft of between 9.3–9.4 m (30 ft 6 in – 30 ft 10 in). Sachsen would have displaced 28,800 metric tons (28,300 long tons) at her designed displacement, which did not include a full load of supplies, fuel, and other operational necessities; at full load, she would have displaced up to 32,500 metric tons (32,000 long tons). Unlike her three sister ships, which were powered by three sets of Schichau steam turbines, Sachsen received only two sets of turbines on the outboard shafts, with steam provided by six coal-fired water-tube boilers and three oil-fired models. Her third shaft was powered by a MAN, six-cylinder, two-stroke diesel engine which was rated at 12,000 metric horsepower (12,000 shp); combined with the turbines, her propulsion system produced 54,000 metric horsepower (53,000 shp). Designed speed was 22.5 knots (41.7 km/h; 25.9 mph). Her engines would have provided a cruising range of 5,000 nautical miles (9,300 km; 5,800 mi) at a speed of 12 knots (22 km/h; 14 mph). Upon commissioning, she would have carried a crew of 42 officers and 1,129 enlisted men.

Had she been completed, she would have been armed with eight 38 cm (15 in) SK L/45 guns. (Note: In Imperial German Navy gun nomenclature, "SK" (Schnelladekanone) denotes that the gun is quick loading, while the L/45 denotes the length of the gun. In this case, the L/45 gun is 45 calibers, meaning that the gun is 45 times as long as it is in bore diameter.) These would have been arranged in four twin-gun turrets: two superfiring turret pairs fore and aft of the superstructure. Her secondary armament was to have consisted of sixteen 15 cm (5.9 in) guns and four 8.8 cm (3.5 in) guns. She would also have been fitted with five 60 cm (23.6 in) torpedo tubes submerged in her hull, one in the bow and two on each broadside. The ship had an armored belt that was 170–350 mm (6.7–13.8 in) thick and an armored deck that was 60–100 mm (2.4–3.9 in) thick. Her forward conning tower had 400 mm (15.7 in) sides, and the main battery turrets had 350 mm thick sides and 200 mm (7.9 in) thick roofs.

== Construction and cancellation ==
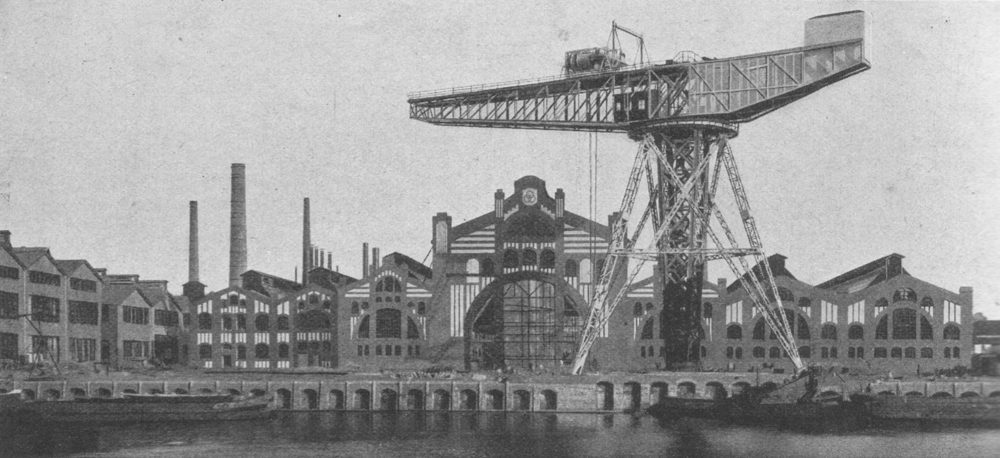
The Germaniawerft shipyard, c. 1902

Sachsen was ordered under the fourth and final Naval Law, which was passed in 1912. Kaiser Wilhelm II approved the design, which had already been ordered from the Germaniawerft shipyard in Kiel; the Reichstag had not officially approved the budget, making the beginning of construction a matter of risk for the shipyard. Funding for the vessel was duly authorized, and on 21 February 1914, the battleship Kronprinz was launched, which cleared the slipway that had been reserved to build Ersatz Kaiser Friedrich III. Preparatory work began immediately after Kronprinz vacated the slipway and on 21 March, Wilhelm II signed the final order to build the new ship. Her keel laying took place on 15 April, and she was assigned the construction number 210. Initial work proceeded slowly, owing to the start of World War I in July, as resources were diverted to complete fitting-out work on Kronprinz as well as several torpedo boats and U-boats under construction at the yard. Her completed hull was scheduled to be launched in early 1916, but the delays pushed her launching to 21 November. Her completion had been planned for early 1917, but increased shortages of material and labor, particularly as these resources began to be diverted to supporting the U-boat campaign against Britain, further slowed work, which eventually ground to a halt.

After Germany resumed and greatly expanded the unrestricted submarine warfare campaign in February 1917, Admiral Eduard von Capelle, who had by then replaced Tirpitz as the head of the RMA, argued that capital ship construction should be halted in favor of U-boat construction. As a result, work stopped on Sachsen altogether, when she was about nine months from completion. Components that had been assembled for her diesel generators were reused on the merchant submarine Bremen. The diesel engine was divided into propulsion systems for four of the Type U 151 submarines in early 1917. By the time work stopped in 1917, Sachsen had received six of her eight main guns, and the remaining pair had been diverted to be converted into railway guns or fixed batteries in Flanders. Approximately 76 percent of the hull had been assembled and 13 percent of her armor had been fitted, with much of the rest in the workshop alongside, being prepared to be installed. The ship was complete up to the battery deck—one deck below the main deck—and 50 percent of her upper deck was in place. Her boilers had been installed and both of her turbines and the diesel engine had been almost completely assembled in the workshop, requiring trials before they could be fitted. Both of her funnels had been erected.

The ship laid unfinished in Kiel at the end of the war. According to Article 186 of the Treaty of Versailles, signed in June 1919, all German surface warships under construction were to be immediately broken up for scrap. At the same time, her guns were removed and she was moved to the Kieler Förde later that year to await the breakers' yard. Sachsen was duly stricken from the naval register on 3 November 1919 and sold in late 1920 to ship breakers. After being sold, she was returned to the shipyard to have her side armor and gun turrets removed. She was then transferred to the breakers to be dismantled, work lasting until 1923.
