= Mackensen-class battlecruiser =

Class of German battlecruisers

- Line-drawing of the Mackensen class

Class overview
- Name: Mackensen
- Builders: Blohm & Voss; Schichau-Werke; Wilhelmshaven Imperial Shipyard
- Operators: Imperial German Navy
- Preceded by: Derfflinger class
- Succeeded by: Ersatz Yorck class
- Planned: 7
- Completed: 0
- Cancelled: 4

General characteristics
- Type: Battlecruiser
- Displacement: 31,000 t (30,510 long tons) (standard); 35,300 t (34,700 long tons) (full load)
- Length: 223 m (731 ft 8 in)
- Beam: 30.4 m (99 ft 9 in)
- Draft: 9.3 m (30 ft 6 in)
- Installed power: 32 × boilers; 90,000 metric horsepower (89,000 shp)
- Propulsion: 4 × geared steam turbines; 4 × screw propellers
- Speed: 28 knots (52 km/h; 32 mph)
- Range: 8,000 nmi (15,000 km; 9,200 mi) at 14 knots (26 km/h; 16 mph)
- Complement: 46 officers; 1,140 enlisted men
- Armament: 8 × 35 cm (13.8 inch) SK L/45 guns; 14 × 15 cm (5.9 in) SK L/45; 8 × 8.8 cm (3.5 in) SK L/45 Flak guns; 5 × 60 cm torpedo tubes
- Armor: Main belt: 100–300 mm (3.9–11.8 in); Turrets: 270 mm (10.6 in); Deck: 30 to 80 mm (1.2 to 3.1 in); Conning tower: 300 mm

The Mackensen class was the last class of battlecruisers to be built by Germany in World War I. The design initially called for seven ships, but three of them were redesigned as the Ersatz Yorck class. Of the four ships of the Mackensen class, Mackensen, Graf Spee, and Prinz Eitel Friedrich were launched, and Fürst Bismarck was not—but none were completed, after wartime shipbuilding priorities were redirected towards U-boats—and the ships were broken up in the early 1920s. The lead ship of the class was named for August von Mackensen, a prominent military commander during the war. In response to the Mackensen-class ships, the British Royal Navy laid down the Admiral-class battlecruisers, all but one of which would eventually be cancelled; the sole survivor, HMS Hood, was completed after the end of the war.

The design of the Mackensens was a much improved version of the previous Derfflinger class. The most significant improvement was a new, more powerful 35 cm (13.8 in) gun, compared to the 30.5 cm (12 in) gun of the earlier ships. The Mackensen-class ships also featured more powerful engines that gave the ships a higher top speed and a significantly greater cruising range. The Mackensen design provided the basis for the subsequent Ersatz Yorck class, armed with 38 cm (15 in) main-battery guns, after the Battle of Jutland in 1916 made the need for the larger guns clear.

== Design ==
The fourth and final Naval Law, passed in 1912, governed the building program of the German navy during World War I. The Imperial Naval Office (Reichsmarineamt) decided the Navy should construct one battleship and one battlecruiser every year between 1913 and 1917, with an additional unit of both types in 1913 and 1916. Design work on the new class began in 1912, with construction intended to begin in the 1914 budget year. The question about the main battery for the new battlecruisers was the most pressing; the previous Derfflinger class was armed with 30.5-centimeter (12 in) guns, though some consideration had been given to redesigning the last two ships—SMS Lützow and Hindenburg—with 35 cm (13.8 in) guns.

The 35 cm guns were heavier than the 30.5 cm guns, and there were problems with enlarging the new ships to accommodate the heavier armament. The Imperial dry docks were deep enough only for ships with a draft of 9 m (30 ft), and simply accepting an increased displacement on the same hull as the Derfflinger class would entail a reduction in speed. This meant that an increase in displacement would necessitate a longer and wider hull to keep any increases in draft minimal and avoid reducing the speed. The constraints on enlarging the hull were compounded by restrictions on width imposed by the locks of the canal in Wilhelmshaven. As a result, Großadmiral (Grand Admiral) Alfred von Tirpitz, the head of the RMA, prohibited a design displacement greater than 30,000 metric tons (29,526 long tons).

The initial design was approved on 30 September 1912, though the heads of the General Navy Department—Vizeadmiral (Vice Admiral) Günther von Krosigk and Konteradmiral (Rear Admiral) Reinhard Scheer—and the Weapons Department head, Vizeadmiral Gerhard Gerdes, had to submit any revisions they deemed were necessary. The design staff suggested using triple or even quadruple gun turrets to keep the displacement under the 30,000-ton limit. Another suggested alternative was to use six 38 cm (15 in) guns in twin turrets, one forward and two aft; Wilhelm II accepted that design on 2 May 1913, though Admiral Friedrich von Ingenohl, the commander in chief of the High Seas Fleet, preferred the 30.5 cm gun of the Derfflinger-class ships. As a compromise, the new battlecruisers were to be armed with eight 35 cm (13.8 inch) guns.

The question of whether the new ships should be powered entirely by oil-fired boilers was less controversial. The design staff was generally in agreement with the standard practice of using coal-fired boilers for two-thirds of the power plant, with the remainder being oil-fired boilers. Coal-fired boilers were preferred because the coal, stored in the sides of the ship, provided additional protection, particularly for the battlecruisers, which carried less armor than their battleship counterparts. (Note: In comparison, the British Royal Navy transitioned to entirely oil-fired boilers with the contemporary Queen Elizabeth-class battleships.) The finalized design was approved on 23 May 1914.

=== General characteristics ===
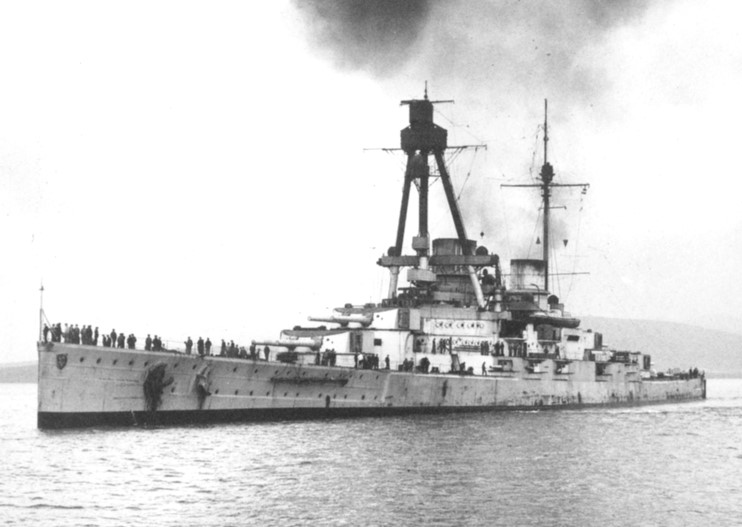
SMS Derfflinger—the Mackensen-class ships would have strongly resembled this vessel

The Mackensen-class ships were 223 m (731 ft 8 in) long and had a beam of 30.4 m (99 ft 9 in) and a draft of 9.3 m (30 ft 6 in) forward and 8.4 m (27 ft 7 in) aft. The ships were designed to displace 31,000 t (30,510 long tons) on a standard load, and up to 35,300 t (34,742 long tons) fully laden. The Mackensens' hulls were composed of longitudinal steel frames, over which the outer hull plates were riveted. This was the same type of construction as in the preceding Derfflinger-class battlecruisers, and was intended to save weight compared to the traditional method of construction, which incorporated both longitudinal and transverse frames. The ships' hulls contained 18 watertight compartments and a double bottom that ran for 92 percent of the length of the hull. This was significantly greater than the older Derfflinger-class ships, which had a double bottom for only 65 percent of the length of the hull.

Experience with previous battlecruiser designs led to the adoption of a continuous upper deck, which raised the level of the deck aft. This was necessary because the aft decks of earlier designs were usually awash when steaming at high speed, even in calm seas. The ships were also equipped with a bulbous bow to reduce drag on the hull, the first time the feature was used in the German Navy. The ships as designed required a crew of 46 officers and 1,140 enlisted sailors. Service as a squadron flagship would increase that number by an additional 14 officers and 62 sailors. The vessels carried a number of small boats, including two picket boats, one barge, two launches, two cutters, and three yawls.

=== Machinery ===
The ships of the Mackensen class were equipped with four sets of marine-type turbine engines, each of which drove a three-bladed screw propeller that was 4.2 m (13 ft 9 in) in diameter. The turbines mounted in Fürst Bismarck were equipped with Föttinger fluid transmission, while those on the other three ships were two sets of direct-coupled turbines with geared transmissions. The ships had 24 coal-fired marine-type single ended boilers and eight oil-fired marine-type boilers. The power plants were designed to provide 90,000 metric horsepower (89,000 shp) and 295 revolutions per minute. Maximum speed was rated at 28 knots (52 km/h; 32 mph). The ships were equipped with a pair of rudders mounted side by side, as opposed to the tandem rudders used on the Derfflinger-class ships.

The ships' turbines were equipped with Föttinger gears, which significantly improved performance at cruising speeds and provided a corresponding increase in range of about 20 percent. The vessels were designed to store 800 t (790 long tons) of coal and 250 t (250 long tons) of oil in purpose-built storage spaces; the hull areas between the torpedo bulkhead and the outer wall of the ship were used to store additional fuel. Maximum fuel capacity was 4,000 t (3,900 long tons) of coal and 2,000 t (2,000 long tons) of oil. This was estimated to give a range of up to about 8,000 nautical miles (15,000 km; 9,200 mi) at a cruising speed of 14 kn (26 km/h; 16 mph). Electrical power on the vessels was provided by eight diesel generators that put out 2,320 kilowatts at 220 volts.

=== Armament ===
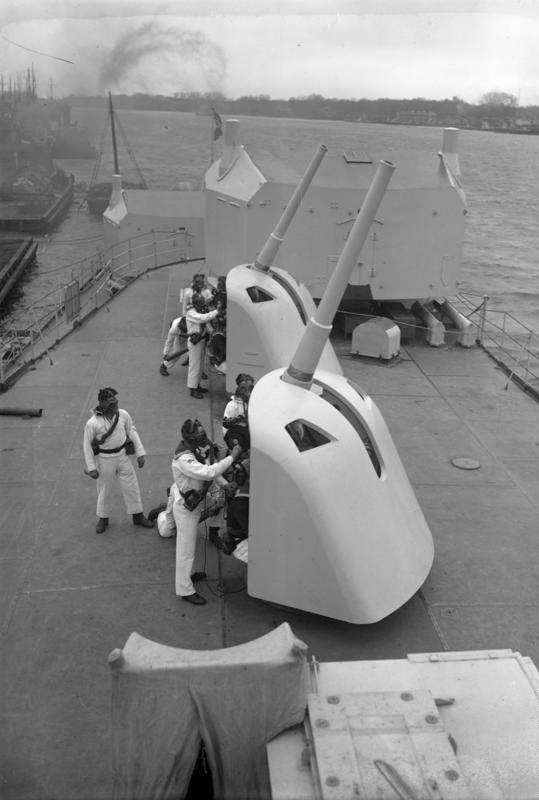
8.8 cm SK L/45 guns in high-angle mounts; Mackensen would have carried this same type

The Mackensens were equipped with a main battery of eight new 35 cm SK L/45 guns (Note: In Imperial German Navy gun nomenclature, "SK" (Schnelladekanone) denotes that the gun is quick firing, while the L/45 denotes the length of the gun. In this case, the L/45 gun is 45 caliber, meaning that the gun barrel is 45 times as long as it is in diameter.) in four twin gun turrets. The turrets were mounted in superfiring pairs fore and aft of the main superstructure. The guns were placed in C/1914 mountings, which could elevate to 20 degrees and depress to −5 degrees. The guns were supplied with a total of 720 armor-piercing shells, or 90 per gun. The weapons were designed to fire 600 kg (1,323 lb) shells at a rate of fire of around 2.5 shots per minute. The shells were fired with a muzzle velocity of 820 meters per second (2,700 ft/s). As with other heavy German guns, these weapons used a fore propellant charge in a silk bag with a main charge in a brass case. These guns could hit targets out to a maximum distance of 23,300 m (25,500 yd).

The ships' secondary battery consisted of fourteen 15 cm (5.9 in) SK L/45 quick-firing guns mounted in armored casemates along the central superstructure. Each gun was supplied with 160 rounds, and had a maximum range of 13,500 m (44,300 ft), though this was later extended to 16,800 m (55,100 ft). The guns had a sustained rate of fire of 7 rounds per minute. The shells were 45.3 kg (99.8 lb), and were loaded with a 13.7 kg (31.2 lb) RPC/12 propellant charge in a brass cartridge. The guns fired at a muzzle velocity of 835 meters per second (2,740 ft/s). The guns were expected to fire around 1,400 shells before they needed to be replaced.

The ships were also armed with eight 8.8 cm (3.45 in) L/45 Flak guns in single pedestal mounts. Four were arranged around the rear superfiring main battery turret and the other four around the forward conning tower. The Flak guns were emplaced in C/13 mountings, which allowed depression to −10 degrees and elevation to 70 degrees. These guns fired 9 kg (19.8 lb) shells, and had an effective ceiling of 9,150 m (30,020 ft) at 70 degrees.

As was standard for warships of the period, the Mackensens were equipped with submerged torpedo tubes. There were five 60 cm (24 in) tubes: one in the bow, and two on each flank of the ship. The torpedoes were the H8 type, which were 9 m (30 ft) long and carried a 210 kg (463 lb) Hexanite warhead. The torpedoes had a range of 8,000 m (8,700 yd) when set at a speed of 35 knots (65 km/h; 40 mph); at a reduced speed of 28 knots (52 km/h; 32 mph), the range increased significantly to 15,000 m (16,000 yd).

=== Armor ===
The Mackensen-class ships were protected with Krupp cemented steel armor, as was the standard for German warships of the period. Specific figures for the arrangement of the armor layout have not survived, but according to naval historian Erich Gröner "The outfit of Krupp armour was similar to that of the [preceding] Derfflinger class". The figures listed here are those for the Derfflinger class. They had an armor belt of 300 mm (11.8 in) thickness in the central citadel of the ship, where the most important parts of the vessel were located. This included the ammunition magazines and the machinery spaces. The belt was reduced in less critical areas, to 120 mm (4.7 in) forward and 100 mm (3.9 in) aft. The belt tapered down to 30 mm (1.2 in) at the bow, though the stern was not protected by armor at all. A 45 mm (1.8 in) torpedo bulkhead ran the length of the hull, several meters behind the main belt. The main armored deck ranged in thickness from 30 mm in less important areas to 80 mm (3.1 in) in the sections that covered the more critical areas of the ship.

The forward conning tower was protected with heavy armor: the sides were 300 mm thick and the roof was 130 mm (5.1 in). The rear conning tower was less well armored; its sides were only 200 mm (7.9 in), and the roof was covered with 50 mm (2 in) of armor plate. The main battery gun turrets were also heavily armored: the turret sides were 270 mm (10.6 in) and the roofs were 110 mm (4.3 in). The 15 cm guns had 150 mm worth of armor plating in the casemates; the guns themselves had 70 mm (2.8 in) shields to protect their crews from shell splinters.

== Construction and cancellation ==
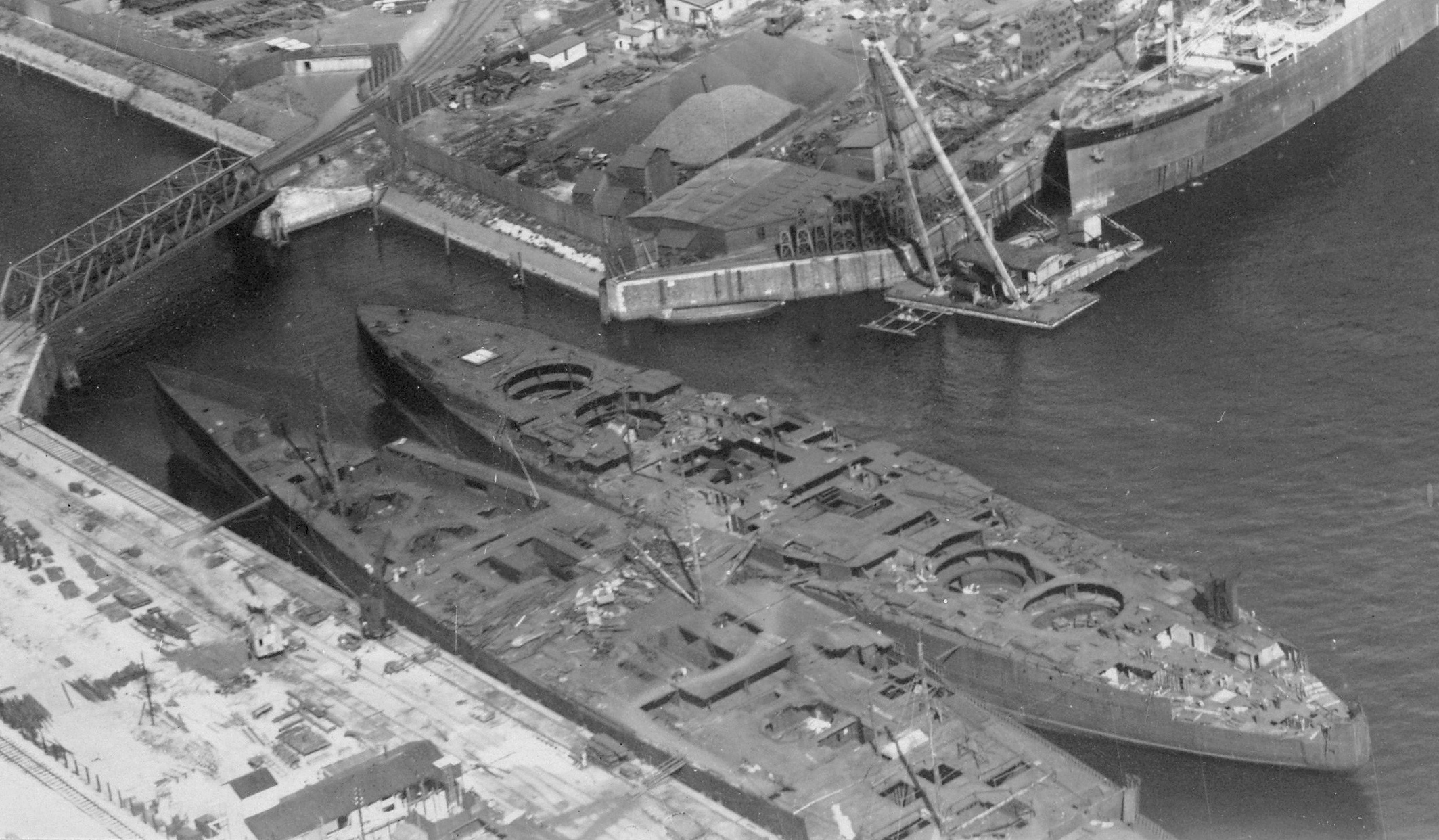
Unfinished battlecruiser Prinz Eitel Friedrich (left) and Bayern-class battleship Württemberg in Hamburg after the war, in about 1920

Seven ships were originally planned in the class: Mackensen, Graf Spee, Prinz Eitel Friedrich, "A"/Ersatz Friedrich Carl, and three other vessels. The last three ships were redesigned as the Ersatz Yorck class, leaving four ships to be built to the Mackensen design. The first two ships were ordered on 14 August 1914, shortly after the outbreak of World War I. Mackensen was funded through the 1914 budget, while funding for Graf Spee came from the war budget. Mackensen—ordered under the provisional name Ersatz Victoria Louise, (Note: German warships were ordered under provisional names. For new additions to the fleet, they were given a single letter; for those ships intended to replace older or lost vessels, they were ordered as "Ersatz (name of the ship to be replaced)".) as a replacement for the old protected cruiser Victoria Louise—was named after Generalfeldmarschall (Field Marshal) August von Mackensen. The ship was laid down on 30 January 1915 at Blohm & Voss in Hamburg, under construction number 240. She was launched on 21 April 1917; at the small launching ceremony, Generaloberst (Colonel General) Josias von Heeringen gave the speech and the ship was christened by Mackensen's wife. Construction was halted about 15 months before she would have been completed. The British mistakenly believed the ship to have been completed, and so they included the ship on the list of vessels to be interned at Scapa Flow instead of the fleet flagship Baden. Mackensen was stricken from the German navy, according to the terms of the Treaty of Versailles, on 17 November 1919. She was sold for scrap and eventually broken up in 1922 at Kiel-Nordmole.

Graf Spee was named for Vice Admiral Maximilian von Spee, the commander of the East Asia Squadron; he was killed when his squadron was annihilated at the Battle of the Falkland Islands in 1914. Graf Spee was laid down on 30 November 1915 in the Schichau yards in Danzig (now Gdańsk, Poland), under the provisional name Ersatz Blücher, to replace the large armored cruiser Blücher that had been sunk at the Battle of Dogger Bank in January 1915. She was launched on 15 September 1917. At the launching ceremony, Großadmiral Prince Heinrich gave the speech and Spee's widow Margarete christened the ship. Construction stopped about 12 months away from completion; Graf Spee was the furthest along of all four ships when work was halted. She too was struck on 17 November 1919; on 28 October 1921 the unfinished hull was sold for 4.4 million Marks and broken up in Kiel-Nordmole.

Prinz Eitel Friedrich, ordered as Ersatz Freya (a replacement for SMS Freya) was named for one of Kaiser Wilhelm II's sons, Eitel Friedrich. She was laid down in 1915 at Blohm & Voss under construction number 241. She was 21 months away from completion when she was launched to clear the slip on 13 March 1920 and was broken up at Hamburg in 1921. At the launching ceremony, dockyard workers named the ship Noske, after Reichswehr Minister Gustav Noske. "A"/Ersatz Friedrich Carl, which was to have been named Fürst Bismarck for the famous German chancellor Otto von Bismarck, and ordered as a replacement for Friedrich Carl, was also laid down 1915 at the Wilhelmshaven Imperial Shipyard under construction number 25. She was about 26 months from completion when work ended. She was never launched; instead, the vessel was broken up on the slip in 1922.

Experience at the Battle of Jutland led the RMA to conclude that ships with 38 cm guns, heavier armor, and a higher top speed were necessary. The Mackensen design was used as the basis for the Ersatz-Yorck class, which incorporated the larger guns and more armor for the main battery turrets and barbettes. More powerful engines were unavailable to compensate for the extra weight, so the designers were forced to accept a reduced speed. Nevertheless, like the Mackensens, the three ships ordered under the Ersatz-Yorck design were never completed. In response, the British ordered the four Admiral-class battlecruisers, though the British designed the class under the mistaken impression that the Mackensen class would be armed with 38.6 cm (15.2 in) guns and would be capable of 30 knots (56 km/h; 35 mph). Three of the four Admiral-class ships were cancelled; only HMS Hood was completed after the end of the war.

The primary reason construction halted on the four ships was the shifting of construction materials and manpower from capital ships to U-boats in the last two years of the war. The RMA filed a report dated 1 February 1918 stating that capital ship construction had ground to a halt primarily for this reason. Some thought was given to convert all four of the ships into dry grain carriers after the war, but the proposals ultimately came to nothing.
