= Ersatz Yorck-class battlecruiser =

Cancelled class of German battlecruisers

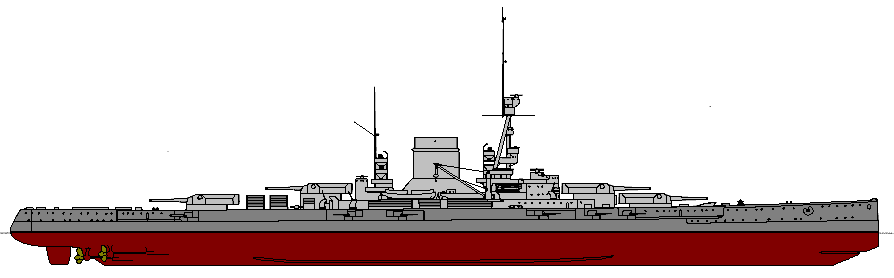
- Line drawing of Ersatz Yorck

Class overview
- Name: Ersatz Yorck
- Builders: AG Vulcan Stettin; Germaniawerft, Kiel; Blohm & Voss, Hamburg
- Operators: Imperial German Navy
- Preceded by: Mackensen class (planned)
- Succeeded by: O class (planned)
- Built: 1915–1918
- Planned: 3
- Cancelled: 3

General characteristics
- Type: Battlecruiser
- Displacement: Normal: 33,500 t (33,000 long tons); Full load: 38,000 t (37,000 long tons)
- Length: 227.8 m (747 ft 5 in)
- Beam: 30.4 m (99 ft 9 in)
- Draft: 9.3 m (30 ft 6 in)
- Installed power: 90,000 metric horsepower (89,000 shp); 32 boilers
- Propulsion: 4 × geared steam turbines; 4 × screw propellers
- Speed: 27.3 knots (50.6 km/h; 31.4 mph)
- Range: 5,500 nmi (10,200 km; 6,300 mi) at 14 knots (26 km/h; 16 mph)
- Complement: 47 officers; 1,180 sailors
- Armament: 8 × 38 cm (15 in) SK L/45; 12 × 15 cm (5.9 in) SK L/45; 8 × 8.8 cm (3.5 in) SK L/45; 3 × 60 cm (24 in) torpedo tubes
- Armor: Main belt: 100 to 300 mm (3.9 to 11.8 in); Deck: 30 to 80 mm (1.2 to 3.1 in); Turrets: 270 mm (10.6 in); Secondary battery: 150 mm (5.9 in)

The Ersatz Yorck class was a group of three battlecruisers ordered but not completed for the German Kaiserliche Marine (Imperial Navy) in 1916. The three ships had originally been ordered as additions to the Mackensen class, but developments abroad, particularly the British Renown-class battlecruisers, led to the navy re-designing the ships. The primary change was an increase of the main battery from eight 35-centimeter (14 in) guns to eight 38 cm (15 in) weapons. Work on the first ship had already begun by the time the navy decided to re-design the ships, so the design staff was constrained by the need to use the material already assembled.

The name derived from the fact that the lead ship was intended as a replacement (German: ersatz) for the armored cruiser Yorck, lost to mines in 1914, and it had been ordered under the provisional name Ersatz Yorck. The other two ships, Ersatz Gneisenau, and Ersatz Scharnhorst, were considered to be replacements for the armored cruisers Gneisenau and Scharnhorst, both of which had been sunk at the Battle of the Falkland Islands, also in 1914.

As with the Mackensens, the three ships of the Ersatz Yorck class were never completed. This was primarily due to shifting wartime construction priorities; U-boats were deemed more important to Germany's war effort later in the war, and so work on other types of ships was slowed or halted outright. The lead ship, Ersatz Yorck, was the only vessel of the three to have begun construction, though she was over two years from completion by the time work was abandoned. The ship was broken up on the slipway and machinery that had been assembled for Ersatz Gneisenau was installed in the first four Type U 151 U-boats. Nevertheless, the work that had gone into the Ersatz Yorck design was not a wasted effort; when the design staff began work on the Scharnhorst-class battleships in the 1930s, they used the plans for Ersatz Yorck as a starting point.

== Development ==
Line-drawing of the Mackensen class, on which the Ersatz Yorck design was based

The fourth and final Naval Law, passed in 1912, governed the building program of the German Navy during World War I. The Reichsmarineamt (RMA – Imperial Naval Office) decided that to meet the requirements set in the 1912 law, the Navy should construct one battleship and one battlecruiser every year between 1913 and 1917, with an additional unit of both types in 1913 and 1916. The RMA initially believed the war would be over quickly, but by early 1915, it had become clear that it would not be the case. As a result, it made the decision to use the prescribed construction program to replace the five armored cruisers that had been sunk in the first six months of the war with new battlecruisers, rather than lay down new battleships. The last three of these new battlecruisers were ordered to replace Yorck and the two Scharnhorst-class cruisers, the former having been sunk by German mines in November 1914 and the latter pair being sunk at the Battle of the Falkland Islands the following month. As they were considered replacements for old ships, rather than as new additions to the fleet, they were ordered under provisional names as "ersatz (replacement) [name of the ship to be replaced]". (Note: German warships were ordered under provisional names. Additions to the fleet were given a single letter; ships intended to replace older or lost vessels were ordered as "Ersatz (name of the ship to be replaced)".)

The three vessels of the Ersatz Yorck class were to have been members of the Mackensen class, and initial funding for the ships was allocated on 21 February 1915. Admiral Eduard von Capelle replaced Grossadmiral (Grand Admiral) Alfred von Tirpitz as the State Secretary of the RMA on 16 March 1916, which led to questions in the RMA over the three ships. Kaiser Wilhelm II wanted the next group of battlecruisers to be equipped with 38-centimeter (15 in) guns instead of the 35 cm (14 in) pieces carried by the Mackensens. On 19 April, the Construction Department submitted several design proposals, including GK1, GK2, and GK3. (Note: "GK" stood for "Grosse Kreuzer" (large cruiser), the German term for battlecruisers at the time.) All three were armed with 38 cm guns and had a displacement of 34,000 to 38,000 t (33,000 to 37,000 long tons). This marked a significant increase over the Mackensen design, which displaced 31,000 t (31,000 long tons) as designed; the bulk of the displacement growth was accounted by the heavier main battery, larger, more powerful engines, and additional boilers that provided a speed increase of 1.5 to 2 knots (2.8 to 3.7 km/h; 1.7 to 2.3 mph) over the Mackensens.

Vizeadmiral (Vice Admiral) Reinhard Scheer, the commander of the High Seas Fleet, expressed his preference for GK2, the largest and fastest of the versions (with a top speed of 29.5 knots (54.6 km/h; 33.9 mph)), during a meeting on 29 April. Some consideration was given to the idea that the new battlecruiser design should represent a merging of the battleship and battlecruiser types—what was later termed a "fast battleship"—a concept Wilhelm II had been pushing for years. The so-called "grosskampfschiff" (large combat ship) would simplify construction and design work, but Konteradmiral (Rear Admiral) Georg Hebbinghaus, the head of the General Navy Department, pointed out that under the German Naval Laws, such a change would not be permitted and that the laws would need to be rewritten to allow the new type. Hebbinghaus nevertheless allowed that the design staff had some leeway in warship development that could be used to get around the legal restrictions.

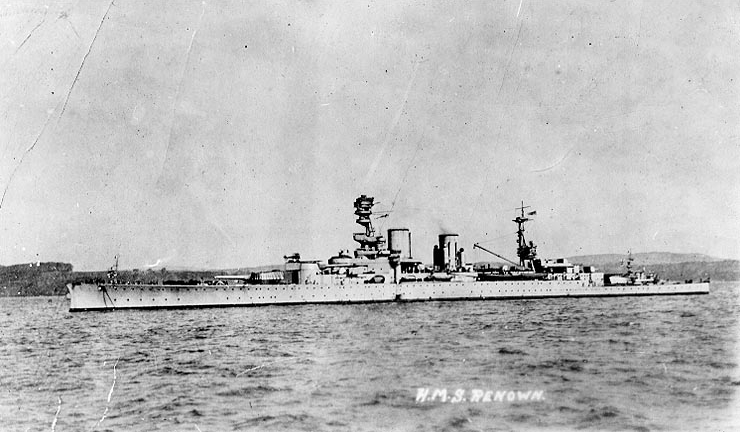
HMS Renown, which spurred the re-design of the three Ersatz Yorcks

In a meeting on 12 August, Hebbinghaus stated that he wanted to build ships that were similar to traditional battleship designs, preferring survivability to offensive power; he argued that the Mackensens should be cancelled in favor of this new type, since they had been designed before the navy had any war experience on which to base them. Capelle stated that the last three Mackensens—Ersatz Yorck, Ersatz Scharnhorst, and Ersatz Gneisenau—and Ersatz Friedrich Carl if work had not proceeded too far along, should be reordered as a completely new design, GK6, which he submitted. This design called for a ship armed with eight 38 cm guns on a displacement of 36,500 t (35,900 long tons) with a top speed of 28 knots (52 km/h; 32 mph). Scheer objected to the decrease in speed, and for the time being, Hebbinghaus's and Capelle's proposals came to nothing. Another meeting on 24 August concluded that all seven ships of the Mackensen class would be built as designed, the General Navy Department noting that they would "still undoubtedly represent a very valuable addition to the fleet in 1919."

Hebbinghaus again raised the issue of the main battery on 31 October, since by then it had become known that the United States Navy would be building the Lexington-class battlecruisers, rumored to be armed with 40 cm (16 in) guns, and that the British were arming their Renown-class battlecruisers with 38 cm guns. By this time, much of the construction resources of the German Navy had been redirected to the U-boat fleet, so the new ships could not be completed before 1920; as a result, the Mackensens would be inferior to the latest American and British designs. Hebbinghaus pushed for the battlecruisers to be armed with at least 38 cm guns, but preferably 40 cm or even 43 cm (16.9 in) guns. By that time, Ersatz Friedrich Carl had been laid down the previous November, and was too far along to be converted, leaving the last three Mackensens as the only members available to be rearmed. The Construction Department accordingly rushed to redesign the vessels to equip them with 38 cm guns, but the work was hampered by the fact that the navy had already ordered the machinery and armor plate for the ships, and work on the materials had already begun. Indeed, Ersatz Yorck had already been laid down in July.

== Design ==
During the re-design process, Scheer requested that the new ships have increased armament, armor, and speed compared to the first four Mackensens, but owing to the constraints imposed, only the armament could be increased, and the deck armor and speed had to be reduced slightly to keep displacement in check. Displacement rose about 2,500 t (2,500 long tons) compared to the Mackensen class, with about 1,000 t (980 long tons) of that increase being a result of the heavier 38 cm guns. The length and draft were also increased to keep the ships' speed from falling too much. Since the ships' propulsion systems had already been ordered, they were kept essentially identical to the original Mackensen design, although internal rearrangements allowed the boilers to be trunked into one large funnel rather than the two of the Mackensens, which conferred several advantages. These included a significant reduction in smoke interference with the spotting tops and additional room to move the tripod mast further aft, which reduced the risk of the mast falling on the conning tower in the event of battle damage and increased the field of view from the spotting top.

=== General characteristics ===
The Ersatz Yorck-class ships were an enlargement of the previous Mackensen-class ships. They were 227.8 m (747 ft 5 in) long at the waterline, compared to 223 m (731 ft 8 in) on the earlier vessels. Ersatz Yorck had the same beam as the earlier vessels, at 30.4 m (99 ft 9 in), and the same maximum draft of 9.3 m (30 ft 6 in). The ships were planned to displace 33,500 t (33,000 long tons) as designed and up to 38,000 t (37,000 long tons) fully laden. The Ersatz Yorck-class ships' hulls were to have been constructed with longitudinal steel frames with the outer plating riveted on. The hulls were divided into eighteen watertight compartments. The crew of the ship was to consist of 47 officers and 1,180 sailors.

=== Machinery ===
As with all German battlecruisers that had been built, the Ersatz Yorck-class ships would have been equipped with four sets of Parsons steam turbines, each of which drove a 3-bladed screw that was 4.2 m (13 ft 9 in) in diameter. The turbines were supplied with steam by 24 coal-fired Schulz-Thornycroft single-ended boilers and 8 oil-fired Schulz-Thornycroft double-ended boilers. Ersatz Yorck and Ersatz Gneisenau were intended to use Föttinger fluid transmission for their turbines, while Ersatz Scharnhorst's turbines retained direct coupled geared transmissions. The ships were to have electrical power provided by diesel generators. The Ersatz Yorcks were intended to mount a pair of rudders side by side for steering.

The power plant was rated 90,000 shaft horsepower (67,000 kW; 91,000 PS) and 295 revolutions per minute, the same as the preceding Mackensen-class ships. Their slightly greater size reduced their speed somewhat, from 28 knots (52 km/h; 32 mph) in the Mackensen-class ships to 27.3 knots (50.6 km/h; 31.4 mph) for the new vessels. The ships were designed to store 850 t (840 long tons) of coal and 250 t (250 long tons) of oil in purpose-designed fuel bunkers. However, the areas of the hull between the torpedo bulkhead and the outer wall of the ship were also used for fuel storage. This additional space provided an increased total of 4,000 t (3,900 long tons) of coal and 2,000 t (2,000 long tons) of oil. With fuel stores topped off, the ships were estimated to have been able to steam for 5,500 nautical miles (10,200 km; 6,300 mi) at a cruising speed of 14 kn (26 km/h; 16 mph).

=== Armament ===
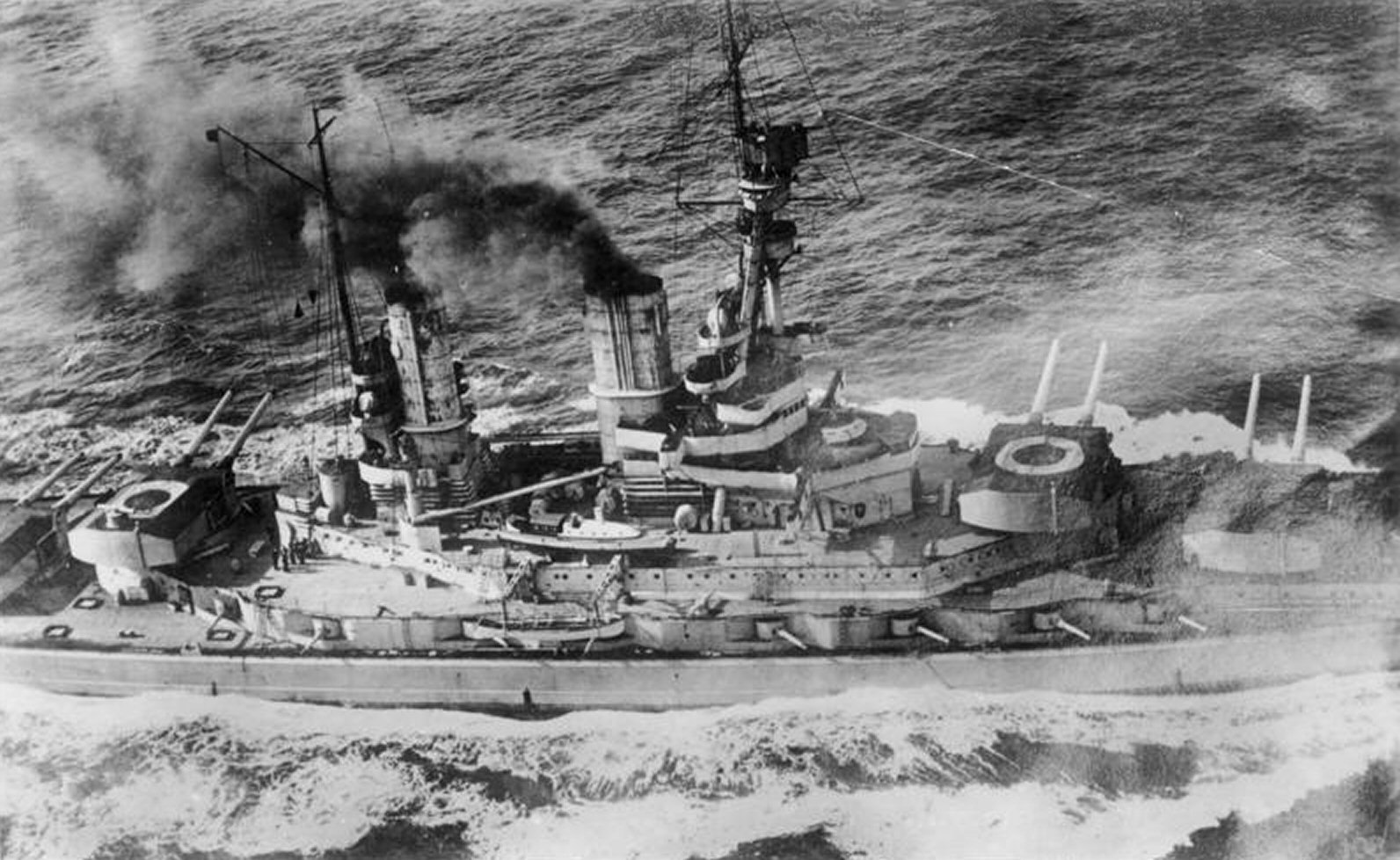
The battleship SMS Baden, main battery trained to port; the Ersatz Yorck-class ships would have been similarly armed.

The Ersatz Yorck-class battlecruisers were to be armed with a main battery of eight 38 cm (15 in) SK L/45 guns in four C/1913 twin-gun turrets; (Note: In Imperial German Navy gun nomenclature, "SK" (Schnelladekanone—quick loading gun) denotes that the gun quick firing, while the L/45 denotes the length of the gun. In this case, the L/45 gun is 45 calibers, meaning that the gun barrel is 45 times as long as it is in diameter.) this was identical to the main armament carried by the Bayern-class battleships. In both designs the turrets were arranged in two superfiring pairs, one forward and the other aft. These turrets originally allowed for depression of the guns to −8 degrees and elevation to 16 degrees, though Bayern had hers modified to allow 20 degrees of elevation, a common practice for German naval weapons during the latter part of the war. The guns had to be returned to 2.5 degrees to reload them. The guns had a maximum range of 20,250 m (66,440 ft). Each turret was fitted with a stereo rangefinder. Intended ammunition stowage for the Ersatz Yorck class was 720 shells or 90 rounds per gun; these were 750-kilogram (1,650 lb) shells that were light for guns of their caliber. The shell allotment was divided between armor piercing and high explosive versions, with 60 of the former and 30 of the latter. At a range of 20,000 m (66,000 ft), the armor-piercing shells could penetrate up to 336 mm (13.2 in) of steel plate. The guns had a rate of fire of around one shell every 38 seconds. Muzzle velocity was 805 meters per second (2,640 ft/s).

The ships' secondary battery was to have consisted of twelve 15 cm (5.9 in) SK L/45 quick-firing guns mounted in armored casemates along the central superstructure. These guns were intended for defense against torpedo boats, and were supplied with a total of 2,240 shells. The guns could engage targets out to 13,500 m (44,300 ft), and after improvements in 1915, their range was extended to 16,800 m (55,100 ft). The guns had a sustained rate of fire of 5 to 7 rounds per minute. The shells were 45.3 kg (100 lb), and were loaded with a 13.7 kg (30 lb) RPC/12 propellant charge in a brass cartridge. The guns fired at a muzzle velocity of 835 metres per second (2,740 ft/s). The ships were also to be equipped with eight 8.8 cm (3.5 in) SK L/45 flak guns in single pedestal mounts. Four were arranged around the rear superfiring main battery turret and the other four around the forward conning tower. The guns were placed in C/13 mountings, which allowed depression to −10 degrees and elevation to 70 degrees. These guns fired 9 kg (20 lb) shells, and had an effective ceiling of 9,150 m (30,020 ft) at 70 degrees.

As was standard for warships of the period, the Ersatz Yorcks were to be equipped with submerged torpedo tubes. There were three 60 cm (24 in) tubes: one in the bow, and one on each flank of the ship. The torpedoes were the H8 type, which were 9 m (30 ft) long and carried a 210 kg (463 lb) hexanite warhead. The torpedoes had a range of 8,000 m (8,700 yd) when set at a speed of 35 knots (65 km/h; 40 mph); at a reduced speed of 28 knots (52 km/h; 32 mph), the range increased significantly to 15,000 m (16,000 yd). The ships would have been supplied with approximately fifteen torpedoes.

=== Armor ===
The Ersatz Yorck-class ships were protected with Krupp cemented steel armor, as was the standard for German warships of the period. The armor layout was identical to the preceding Mackensen class, which was itself very similar to the armor scheme on the preceding Derfflinger-class ships. (Note: The figures listed here are those for the Derfflinger class; specific figures for the Ersatz Yorck class are unknown. German naval historian Erich Gröner states "The outfit of Krupp armour was similar to that of the Derfflinger class.") They had an armor belt that was 300 mm (11.8 in) thick in the central citadel of the ship, where the most important parts of the ship were located. This included the ammunition magazines and the machinery spaces. The belt was reduced in less critical areas, to 120 mm (4.7 in) forward and 100 mm (3.9 in) aft. The belt tapered down to 30 mm (1.2 in) at the bow, though the stern was not protected by armor at all. A 45 mm (1.8 in) torpedo bulkhead ran the length of the hull, several meters behind the main belt. The main armored deck ranged in thickness from 30 mm in less important areas, to 80 mm (3.1 in) in the sections that covered the more critical areas of the ship.

The forward conning tower was protected with heavy armor: the sides were 300 mm thick and the roof was 130 mm (5.1 in). The rear conning tower was less well armored; its sides were only 200 mm (7.9 in) and the roof was covered with 50 mm (2 in) of armor plate. The main battery gun turrets were also heavily armored: the turret sides were 270 mm (11 in) thick and the roofs were 110 mm (4.3 in). The 15 cm guns had 150 mm worth of armor plating in the casemates; the guns themselves had 70 mm (2.8 in) shields to protect their crews from shell splinters.

== Construction and cancellation ==
The contracts for the ships had originally been allocated while still members of the Mackensen class. Ersatz Yorck, a replacement for the armored cruiser Yorck, was awarded to AG Vulcan in Hamburg on 10 April 1915. Ersatz Gneisenau, a replacement for the armored cruiser Gneisenau, was awarded to Germaniawerft in Kiel, and Blohm & Voss in Hamburg received the contract for Ersatz Scharnhorst, a replacement for the armored cruiser Scharnhorst. Work on Ersatz Yorck began with her keel laying in July 1916 under yard number 63, and the midship section of the hull had been assembled by the time the ships were redesigned.

The ships were never completed, primarily because by 1917, the shipbuilding industry had largely been diverted to support the U-boat Campaign, which had become the priority of the Navy. After 1917, work on Ersatz Yorck only took place in order to occupy dockyard workers who could not be employed on U-boat construction. (Note: For example, men at AG Vulcan continued to work the battleship Württemberg into 1917, despite the fact that the Navy had determined that she could not be completed, primarily to clear the slipway so it could be used for other projects.) The RMA filed a report dated 1 February 1918, which stated that capital ship construction had stopped, primarily due to the shifting priorities to the U-boat war. As a result, the hull frames that had been assembled were subsequently scrapped on the slipway. Some material for Ersatz Gneisenau had been constructed, including the ship's diesel generators, which were subsequently installed in the first four Type U 151 U-boats U-151, U-152, U-153, and U-154. No work was done on Ersatz Scharnhorst before the ships were cancelled.

Already in 1918, the design staff revived the grosskampfschiff concept with a series of design studies that ranged from smaller counterparts to the British Courageous class of "large light cruisers" to very large, 45,000 t (44,000 long tons) battlecruisers armed with 42 cm (16.5 in) guns. The design studies ultimately demonstrated that the type of ship that Scheer desired was impractical owing to the size limitations imposed by the German Navy's infrastructure, specifically the existing dry docks and the Kaiser Wilhelm Canal. Though the Ersatz Yorck-class ships were not completed, the design formed the starting point for the work that ultimately produced the Scharnhorst-class battleships built by the Kriegsmarine in the mid-1930s.

== See also ==
- H-class battleship proposals – a series of battleship designs for Nazi Germany's Kriegsmarine that were also cancelled.
