= Emil Kopp =

French chemist

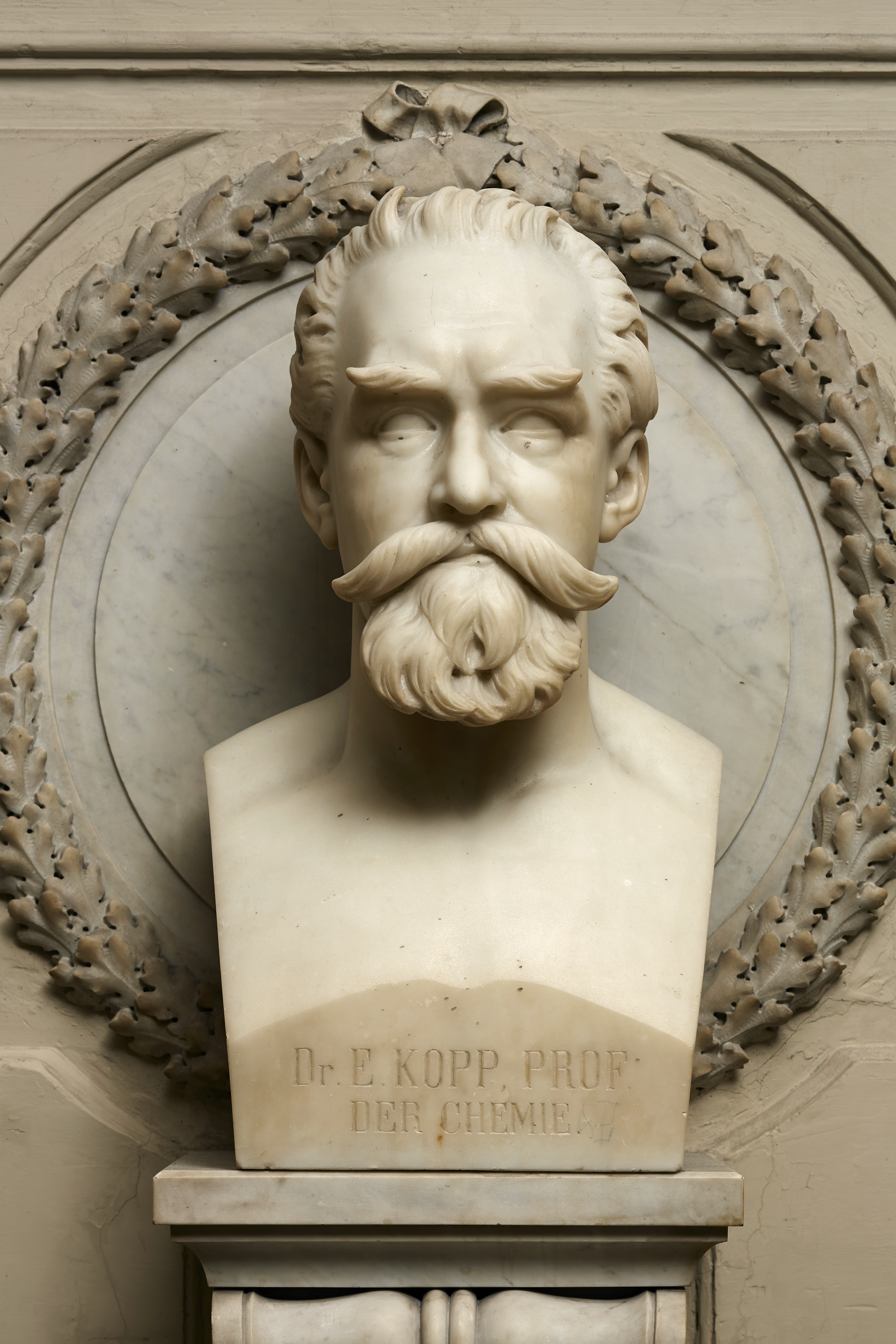
- Bust of Emil Kopp made in 1876
- Born: 3 March 1817; Wasselonne, Alsace, France
- Died: 30 November 1875 (aged 58); Zürich, Switzerland
- Scientific career
- Fields: organic chemistry

Emil Kopp (3 March 1817 – 30 November 1875) was a French chemist.

== Biography ==
Kopp was born on 3 March 1817 in Wasselonne. He became in 1847 a professor of toxicology and chemistry at the École supérieure de Pharmacie at Strasbourg. Because of his participation in the demonstration on "revolutionary day" 13 June 1849, he was forced to leave France, subsequently settling in Switzerland. In 1849 he became a professor of physics and chemistry at Lausanne, and in 1852 a chemist to a Turkey red factory near Manchester. In 1855 he was granted amnesty and returned to France. In 1868 he was named a professor of technology at Turin (Regio Museo Industriale italiano), and finally, in 1871, a professor of technical chemistry at the Federal Polytechnic Institute Zurich, today the ETH Zurich. He died in Zürich.

He conducted experiments with arsenic acid as a discharge agent and filed patents for the employment of arsenic and phosphoric acids in discharge printing of fabrics. In 1844 he reportedly was the first to discover red phosphorus; his findings taking place prior to Anton Schrötter's discovery of the substance during the following year.

With Pompejus Bolley, he published "Traité des matières colorantes artificielles dérivées du goudron de houille" (1874, "Treatise on artificial dyes derived from coal tar").

== See also ==
- Aurantia
- Styrene
