= Etablissements René Neymann =

French food company

Société d'exploitation des Etablissements René Neymann
- Type: Société à responsabilité limitée
- Industry: Food industry
- Founded: 1850
- Headquarters: Wasselonne, France
- Key people: Jean-Claude Neymann (General manager)
- Products: Unleavened bread, special bread, matzo
- Number of employees: 17 (end 2009)
- Website: www.neymann.com (english version)

Etablissement René Neymann is a French company founded in 1850 that makes matzah and unleavened bread. It is the oldest company of unleavened bread operating in France. The general manager is Jean-Claude Neymann, who represents the 5th generation of managers of this familial and artisanal company.

== History ==
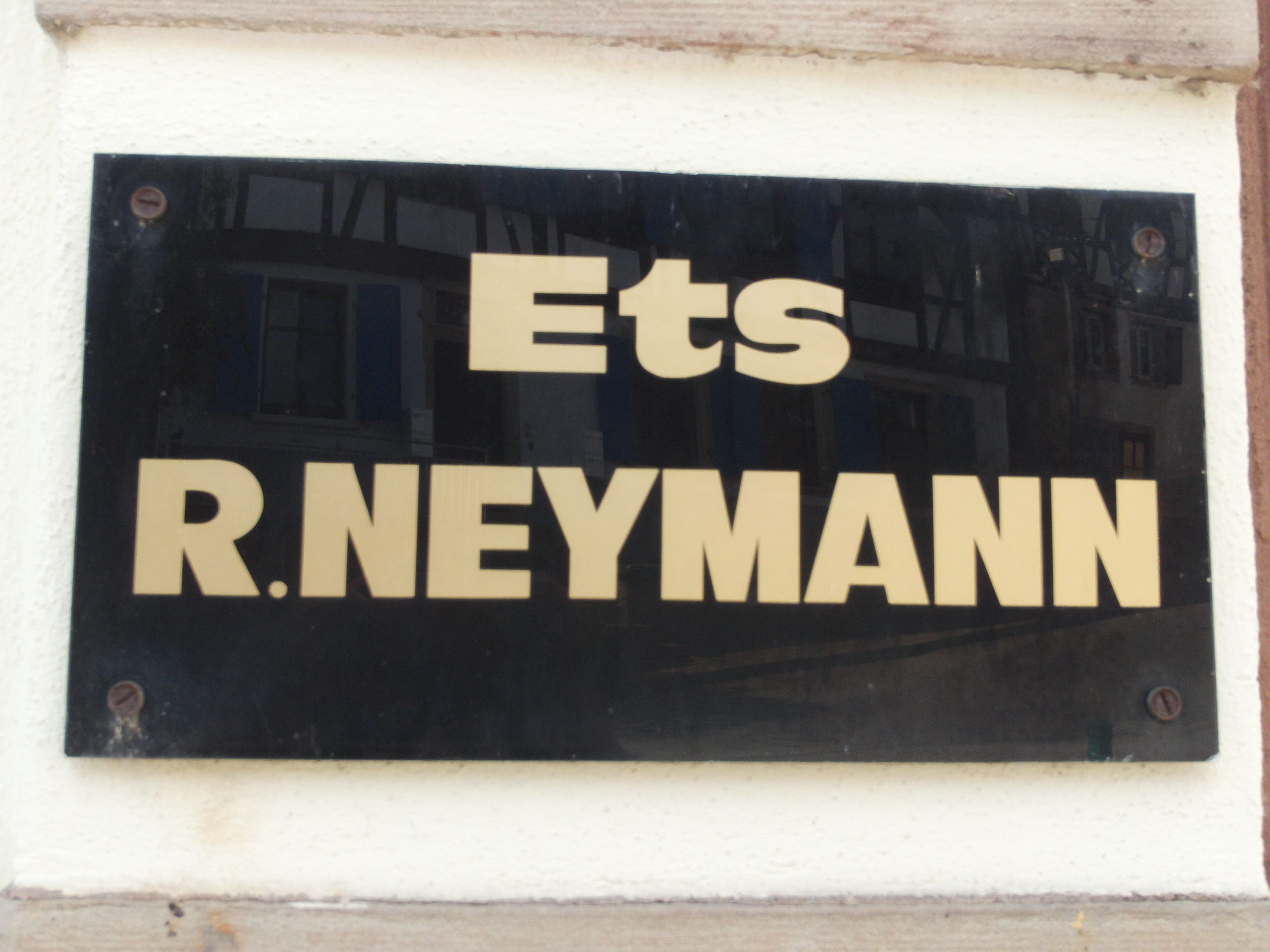
Nameplate of Etablissements René Neymann factory

Etablissement René Neymann was founded in 1850 in Odratzheim by Salomon Neymann. In 1870, Salomon Neymann and his son, Benoit Neymann, moved to Wasselonne. In 1930, the firm began to sell unleavened bread to the non-religious public. The production stopped during the Second World War, René Neymann restarted the company in 1948.

Today, this company exports about 62% of its production. It also produces some (between 20 and 30% of the production) organic goods.

The company was rewarded in 2015 with the state label Entreprise du Patrimoine Vivant and in 2016 with the award of the Legion of Honor to its director, in recognition of "Jean-Claude Neymann's deep commitment to the survival and development of the Wasselonnaise family business of making azyme breads".
