= Hexanitrodiphenylamine =

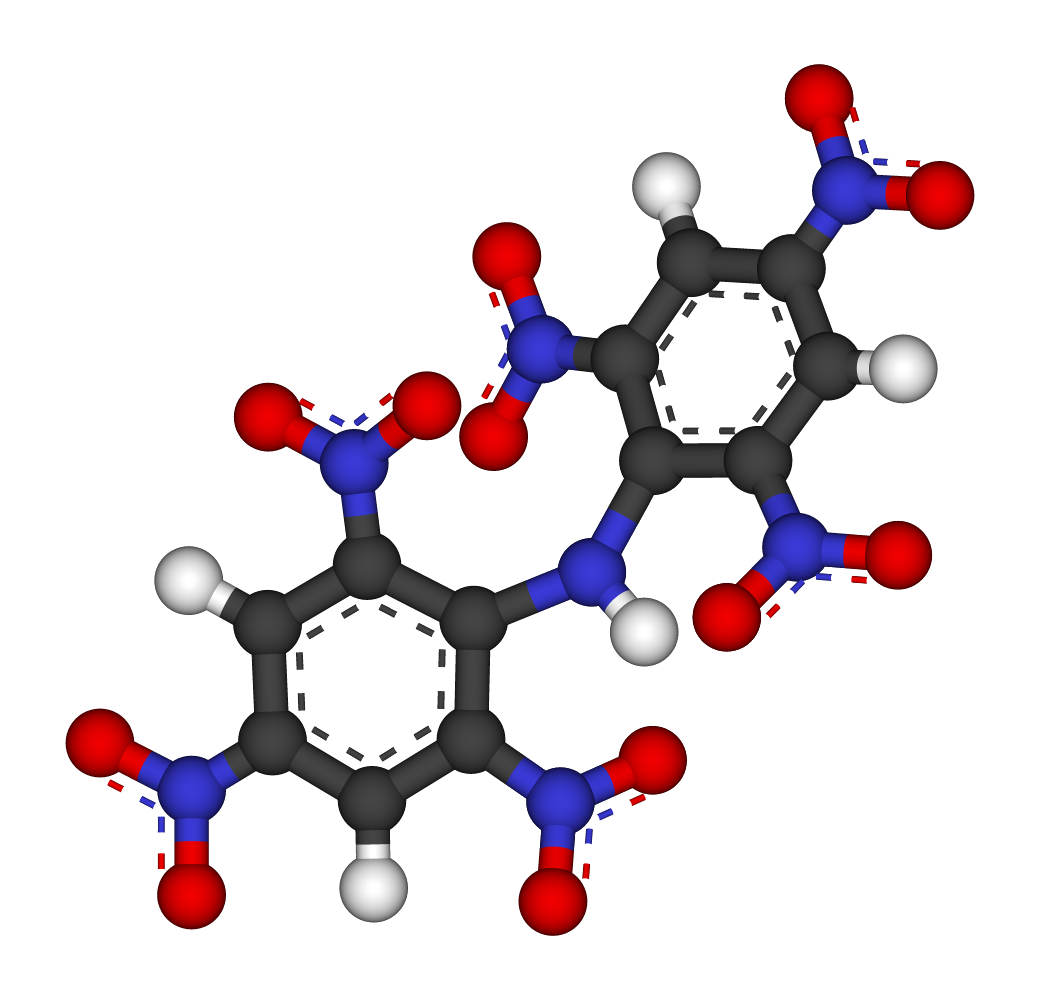

Names
- Preferred IUPAC name 2,4,6-Trinitro-N-(2,4,6-trinitrophenyl)aniline
- Other names bis(2,4,6-Trinitrophenyl)amine; HNDA; HNDPA; Dipicrylamine; Hexamine; Hexil; Hexyl; Hexite; Hexamin

Identifiers
CAS Number	131-73-7
3D model (JSmol)	Interactive image
ChemSpider	8258
ECHA InfoCard	100.004.581
EC Number	205-037-8
PubChem CID	8576
UNII	14STR4KG8T
CompTox Dashboard (EPA)	DTXSID4059621
- InChI: InChI=1S/C12H5N7O12/c20-14(21)5-1-7(16(24)25)11(8(2-5)17(26)27)13-12-9(18(28)29)3-6(15(22)23)4-10(12)19(30)31/h1-4,13H Key: CBCIHIVRDWLAME-UHFFFAOYSA-N
- SMILES: C1=C(C=C(C(=C1[N+](=O)[O-])NC2=C(C=C(C=C2[N+](=O)[O-])[N+](=O)[O-])[N+](=O)[O-])[N+](=O)[O-])[N+](=O)[O-]

Properties
Chemical formula	C_{12}H_{5}N_{7}O_{12}
Molar mass	439.209 g·mol^{−1}
Appearance	Crystalline solid. Yellow to orange. As ordinarily manufactured, it is yellow brown.
Density	1.64 g/cm^{3} (pressed)
Melting point	243 to 245 °C; 469 to 473 °F; 516 to 518 K with decomposition
Solubility in water	Soluble in acetone, warm glacial acetic acid, nitric acid, or aqueous alkalies except potassium hydroxide.

Explosive data
Detonation velocity	7100 m/s
- Except where otherwise noted, data are given for materials in their standard state (at 25 °C [77 °F], 100 kPa). verify (what is ?) Infobox references

Hexanitrodiphenylamine (abbreviated HND), is an explosive chemical compound with the formula C_{12}H_{5}N_{7}O_{12}. Since it is made from readily available raw materials, HND was used extensively by the Japanese and less extensively by Nazi Germany during World War II but was discontinued due to its toxicity.

== Preparation ==
Dinitrodiphenylamine is treated with 98% nitric acid. The starting material, dinitrodiphenylamine, is obtained from the reaction of aniline, dinitrochlorobenzene, and soda ash.

== Applications ==
HND is more powerful and less sensitive to shock or percussion than picric acid; it was mixed with other explosives as filling for bombs to a considerable extent during World War I.

It was also used in World War II by the Germans as a component of Hexanite (60% TNT - 40% HND) and by the Japanese as a component of Kongo (Type 98 H_{2}) (60% Trinitroanisole - 40% HND) for use in bombs, sea mines and depth charges; Seigate (Type 97 H) (60% TNT - 40% HND) for use in torpedo warheads and depth charges; and also in Otsu-B (60% TNT, 24% HND & 16% aluminium powder) for use in torpedo warheads.

Its ammonium salt, also known as Aurantia or Imperial Yellow, was discovered in 1873 by Emil Kopp and used as a yellow colorant for leather, wool and silk in the 19th and early 20th centuries.

== Safety and toxicity ==
A most toxic and poisonous explosive, it attacks the skin, causing blisters which resemble burns. Dust from HND is injurious to the mucous membranes of the mouth, nose, and lungs. Several nitroaromatic explosives, including HND, have been found to be mutagens.

== Incidents ==
On 12 May 2022, construction of the Bundesautobahn 49 in Germany was halted, after traces of the explosive were found in the excavated material. The road passes over a former explosives factory near Stadtallendorf. The factory had been demolished after World War II, and it was not expected that traces of explosives had remained in the ground.

== See also ==
- Hexanite
