= Pompejus Bolley =

German-Swiss chemist (1812–1870)

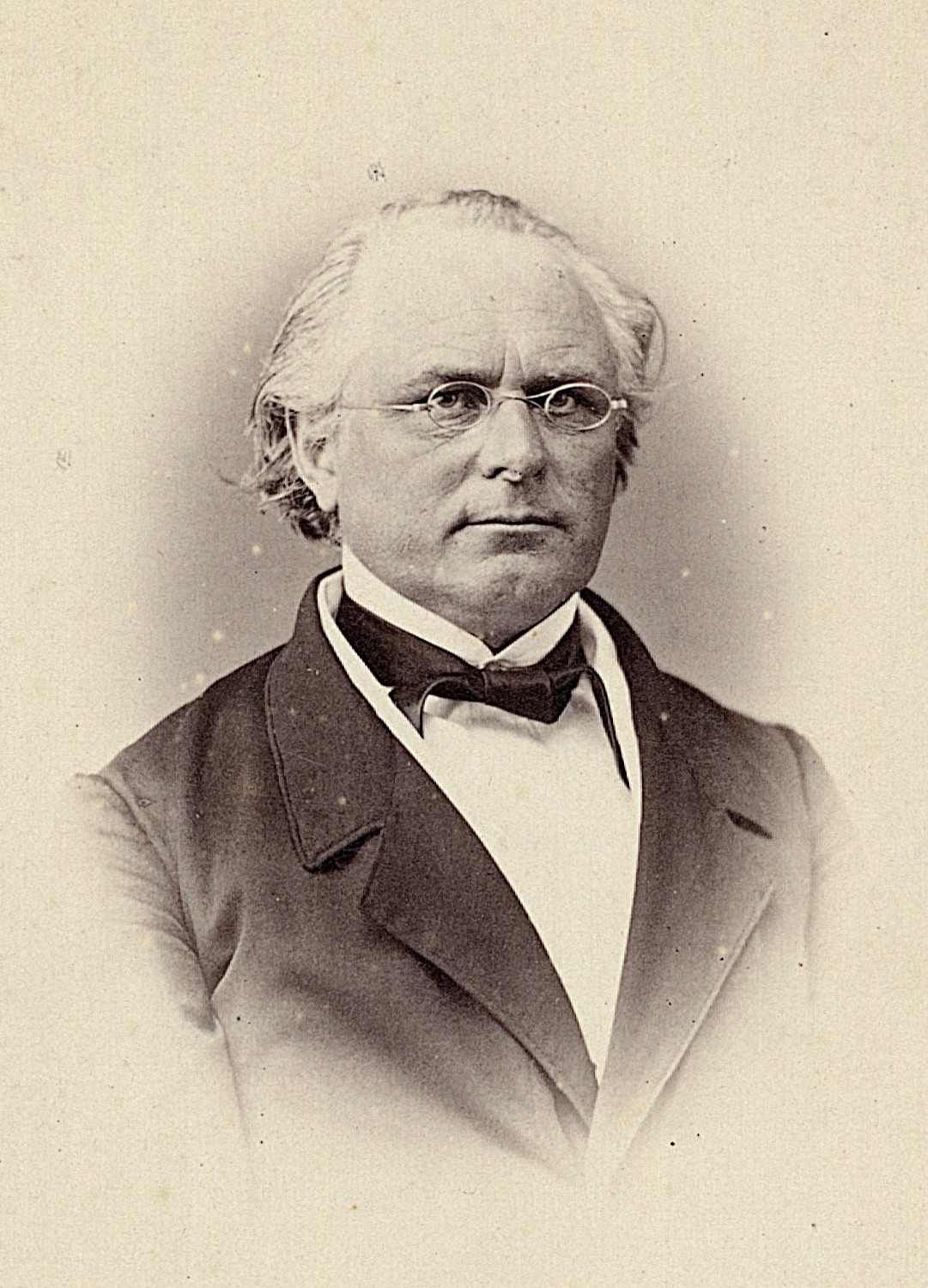
Pompejus Bolley, c. 1870

Pompejus Alexander Bolley (7 May 1812 in Heidelberg – 3 August 1870 in Zürich) was a German-Swiss chemist known for his work in dye chemistry.

From 1831 to 1836 he studied mineralogy and chemistry at the University of Heidelberg, where for a period of time he was an assistant to Leopold Gmelin. From 1838 to 1855 he was a professor of chemistry at the cantonal school in Aarau. He was a co-founder of the Federal Polytechnic School in Zürich, where from 1855 to 1870 he served as a professor of chemical technology. From 1859–65 he was also director of the school — in 1864 he was the target of student protests against his strict school policies.

== Published works ==
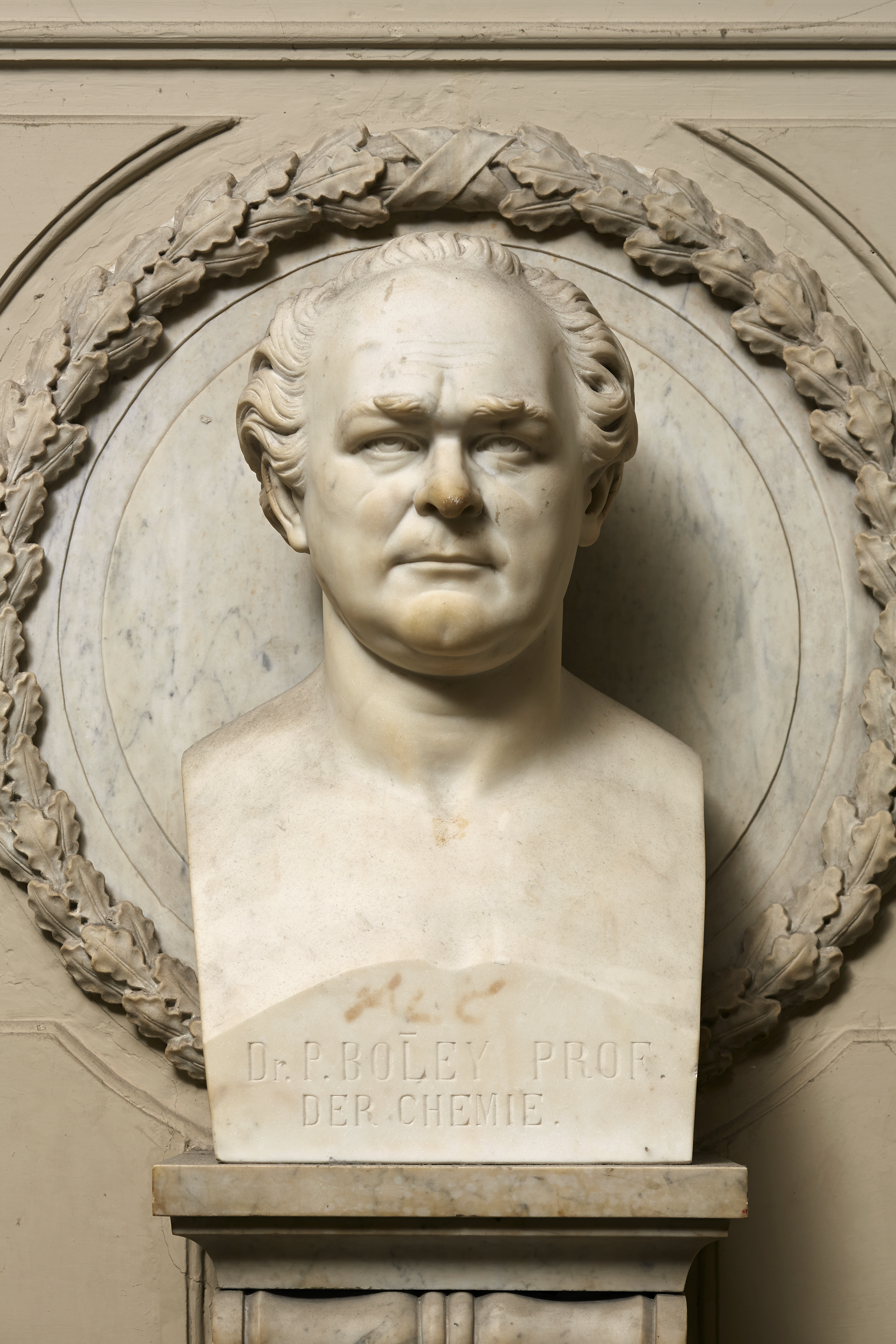

For 13 years he was editor of the "Schweizerischen Gewerbeblattes" ("Swiss Trade Journal"), and from 1856, editor of the "Schweizerische Polytechnische Zeitschrift", a journal that includes many of his scientific works. He also published extensively in "Liebig's Annalen". Some of his principal written efforts are:

- Handbuch der technisch-chemischen Untersuchungen, 1853 (translated into English in 1857 as "Manual of technical analysis").
- Handbuch der chemischen Technologie, 1862 – Manual of chemical technology.
- Altes und Neues aus Farbenchemie und Färberei, 1867 – Old and new on dye chemistry and dyeing.
- Manuel pratique d'essais et de recherches chimiques appliqués aux arts et à l'industrie, 1869 – Practical manual of tests and applied chemical research involving the arts and industry.
- Traité des matières colorantes artificielles dérivées du goudron de houille; with Emil Kopp, 1874 – Treatise on artificial dyes derived from coal tar.
