= Derfflinger-class battlecruiser =

Battlecruiser class of the German Imperial Navy

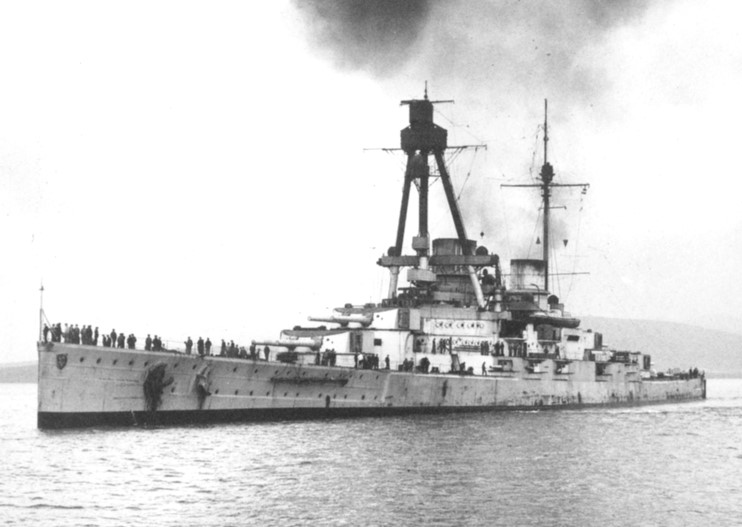
- SMS Derfflinger

Class overview
- Name: Derfflinger
- Builders: Blohm & Voss (1); Kaiserliche Werft Wilhelmshaven (1); Schichau-Werke (1)
- Operators: Imperial German Navy
- Preceded by: SMS Seydlitz
- Succeeded by: Mackensen class
- Built: 1912–1917
- In service: 1914–1919
- Completed: 3
- Lost: 1

General characteristics
- Type: Battlecruiser
- Displacement: 26,600 t (26,200 long tons) normal load; 31,200 t (30,700 long tons) full load
- Length: 210.40 m (690 ft 3 in) overall
- Beam: 29 m (95 ft 2 in)
- Draft: 9.20 m (30 ft 2 in)
- Installed power: 14 coal-fired boilers; 8 oil-fired boilers; 63,000 PS (62,000 shp)
- Propulsion: 2 sets steam turbines; 4 × screw propellers
- Speed: 26.5 knots (49.1 km/h; 30.5 mph)
- Range: 5,600 nmi (10,400 km; 6,400 mi) at 14 knots (26 km/h; 16 mph)
- Complement: 44 officers; 1,068 enlisted men
- Armament: 8 × 30.5 cm SK L/50 guns; 12 × 15 cm SK L/45 guns; 12 × single 8.8 cm guns; 4 × 50 cm (19.7") torpedo tubes
- Armor: Belt: 100–300 mm (3.9–11.8 in); Turrets: 270 mm (10.6 in); Conning tower: 300 mm
- Notes: (Note: Figures are for Derfflinger)

The Derfflinger class was a class of three battlecruisers of the German Kaiserliche Marine (Imperial Navy). The ships were ordered for the 1912–1913 Naval Building Program of the German Imperial Navy as a reply to the Royal Navy's two new Lion-class battlecruisers that had been launched a few years earlier. The preceding Moltke class and the incrementally improved Seydlitz represented the end of the evolution of Germany's first generation of battlecruisers. The Derfflinger class had considerable improvements, including a larger primary armament, all of which was mounted on the centerline. The ships were also larger than the preceding classes. The Derfflinger class used a similar propulsion system, and as a result of the increased displacement were slightly slower.

The class comprised three ships: Derfflinger, Lützow, and Hindenburg. All three of the ships saw active service with the High Seas Fleet during World War I. Derfflinger was commissioned shortly after the outbreak of war, and was present at most of the naval actions in the North Sea, including the battles of Dogger Bank and Jutland. Lützow was commissioned in August 1915, and participated only in the raid on Yarmouth before being sunk at Jutland. Hindenburg was commissioned into the fleet in May 1917, and saw no major action. Derfflinger and Hindenburg were interned at Scapa Flow following the armistice in November 1918. Rear Admiral Ludwig von Reuter, who was in command of the interned High Seas Fleet, ordered the ships to be scuttled in an attempt to prevent their possible seizure by the Royal Navy.

== Development ==
=== Background ===
Discussions began in April 1910 over the basic design requirements for the next German battlecruiser, which was to follow SMS Seydlitz. The Construction Department's design section requested general specifications in mid-April, but the General Department replied that it was too early. They cited the fact that the Nassau-class battleships had not yet completed firing trials and other design projects—such as a triple gun turret and a large diesel engine—were still in very early stages of development. At the same time, the General Department's Vizeadmiral (VAdm—Vice Admiral) Adolf Paschen noted that the British Royal Navy had increased the caliber of its battlecruisers' main battery from 30.5 cm (12 in) to 34 cm (13.5 in), and so the Germans would need to increase their own from 28 cm (11 in) to 30.5 cm. He also argued that the propulsion system should be changed from four to three screw propellers, with the center screw powered by a diesel engine for improved fuel economy.

Admiral Alfred von Tirpitz, the State Secretary of the Reichsmarineamt (Imperial Naval Office), convened the first of a series of meetings to discuss the next battlecruiser design at around the same time as the discussions between the Construction and General departments. The first meeting, held on 11 May, examined the results of recent firing tests of the 28 and 30.5 cm guns, along with that of an experimental 32 cm (13 in) gun. Konteradmiral (Rear Admiral) Gerhard Gerdes, a member of the Weapons Department, stated that expected battle ranges of 8,000 to 10,000 meters (8,750 to 10,940 yd), the 28 cm gun would not be able to penetrate the armor of the latest British battlecruisers, which was believed to be 250 mm (9.8 in) thick. Tirpitz argued that fighting would take place at much closer distances, ranges at which the 28 cm gun could still penetrate armor of that thickness. Paschen and VAdm Max Rollmann, the latter from the Construction Department, also voted for the 28 cm gun, which Tirpitz announced was at least temporarily the selection.

Tirpitz next pressed the question of the ship's propulsion system; he strongly favored the adoption of diesel engines, which he saw as a way to take a significant qualitative step ahead of foreign navies that still relied entirely on steam turbines. The naval engineer Hans Bürkner opposed the measure, given the untested nature of the new engine (and associated risks should the project fail), along with the excessive workload that would be created for the design staff, since they would need to redesign the underwater protection scheme and other aspects of the hull. The designers suggested that simply ordering the next cruiser, provisionally titled "K", (Note: German warships were ordered under provisional names. Additions to the fleet were given a single letter; ships intended to replace older or lost vessels were ordered as "Ersatz (name of the ship to be replaced)".) as a sister ship to Seydlitz. The final decision on diesel engines, either as the sole engine type or as part of a mixed installation with turbines, was forced after the head of the Construction Department's propulsion section informed the naval leadership on 1 September that the diesel engine being developed by MAN AG would not be ready for "K".

=== Design preparation ===
Detailed design work began soon after the initial discussions in early 1910. The design staff started with abandoned proposals for Seydlitz, projects "IIIc" and "IVe"; the former was a four-turret-armed ship equipped with 30.5 cm guns and the latter carried ten 28 cm guns in five turrets, all of which were mounted on the centerline. In June 1910, a third alternative that combined the two variants—four 30.5 turrets on the centerline—was produced. By that time, Tirpitz was convinced that the larger gun was preferable. The decision was formally adopted in a meeting on 1 September, which was memorialized by Tirpitz the following day. In the memo, he expressed a preference for two superfiring pairs, one forward and one aft, but conceded that if this were impossible, an offset wing turret arrangement as used in the battlecruiser SMS Von der Tann would be acceptable. He also indicated that a fifth turret should be incorporated if weight and cost limits could be met, though such an increase proved to be prohibitive by both metrics.

On 22 September, Bürkner submitted his evaluation of three different proposals, designated 1, 2, and 3. The first used the Von der Tann arrangement for the main battery, while the latter two used the centerline layout. The primary differences between 2 and 3 were the spacing of the rear pair of turrets (2 being placed close together, while 3 increased the distance) and the placement of the secondary armament; 2 raised the secondary guns to the upper deck. All three proposals maintained the same level of armor protection as in Seydlitz, along with speed and coal provisioning. Bürkner recommended design 3, but with the raised secondary battery as in 2; this refined design was then designated 4, which Kaiser Wilhelm II approved on 26 September. Further detailed improvements produced design 4b.

On 18 March, the design staff presented design 5, which included a number of internal improvements over 4b. One of the internal decks was removed from the central portion of the ship, which allowed greater space for coal storage. The designers also adopted a new construction technique to save weight. Previous battlecruisers were built with a combination of transverse and longitudinal steel frames; the Derfflinger-class ships dispensed with the transverse frames and used only longitudinal ones. This enabled the ship to retain structural strength and a lower weight. Lastly, because of the internal reorganization, the boiler rooms could be divided by an internal bulkhead that reduced the risk of flooding in the event of underwater damage. Large capacity double-ended boilers that had been tested aboard Von der Tann would also be used, which should provide the ship with the same speed as Seydlitz or better.

Design 5 had one significant drawback; the ship's metacentric height would have been around 2.7 to 2.9 m (8 ft 10 in to 9 ft 6 in), which was too high, as it would have caused the ship to roll too quickly. The fast roll period would have degraded the gunners' ability to aim their weapons. The beam could be reduced by about 2 m (6 ft 7 in), but this would corresponding reduce the space between the outer hull and the torpedo bulkhead, which would have worsened the ship's resistance to underwater damage. Frahm anti-roll tanks were also considered, but these would have caused an increase in displacement and cost. Another conference was held on 30 March 1911 to evaluate the proposals, along with ideas to save weight to accommodate the anti-roll tanks. Among the options considered were a reduction in the thickness of the torpedo bulkhead or the bow armor, and the substitution of some oil-fired boilers for coal-burning boilers.

A finalized version, 5b, was completed on 15 June. The changes from design 5 included the reduction of the torpedo bulkhead and lowering the height of the bow armor, but not the adoption of partial oil firing for the boilers. In addition, the secondary battery was lowered by a level and brought to the edges of the hull, which had the effect of improving the ship's seakeeping. Displacement had increased from about 25,900 to 26,600 t (25,500 to 26,200 long tons; 28,500 to 29,300 short tons), and the hull had been slightly lengthened and widened to accommodate the additional weight. Wilhelm II approved the design soon thereafter. On 30 June, the naval leadership met again to discuss oil-burning boilers; those in favor argued that they were lighter and easier to operate, which would afford a significant reduction in crews. Those opposed cited the difficulty in obtaining fuel oil, especially in a crisis, and that coal storage bunkers provided protection that oil tanks could not. The conference participants concluded that eight of the twenty-two boilers should be oil fired. They also decided to install the Frahm anti-roll tanks, despite the fact that tests aboard Von der Tann revealed they only reduced rolling by about 33%.

The Derfflinger-class battlecruisers were ordered under the fourth and final Naval Law, which was passed in 1912. Tirpitz used public outcry over the British involvement in the Agadir Crisis of 1911 to pressure the Reichstag into appropriating additional funds to the Navy. The Fourth Naval Law secured funding for three new dreadnoughts, two light cruisers, and an extra 15,000 officers and men in the Navy for 1912. The three dreadnoughts secured in the bill became Derfflinger, Lützow, and Hindenburg. In the meantime, pressure from the British public and media had forced the British Parliament to step up ship building. Kaiser Wilhelm II requested that the build time for the new battlecruisers be reduced to two years each, as opposed to three years. This proved unfeasible, because neither the armor or armament firms could supply the necessary materials according to an expedited schedule.

== Design ==
=== General characteristics ===
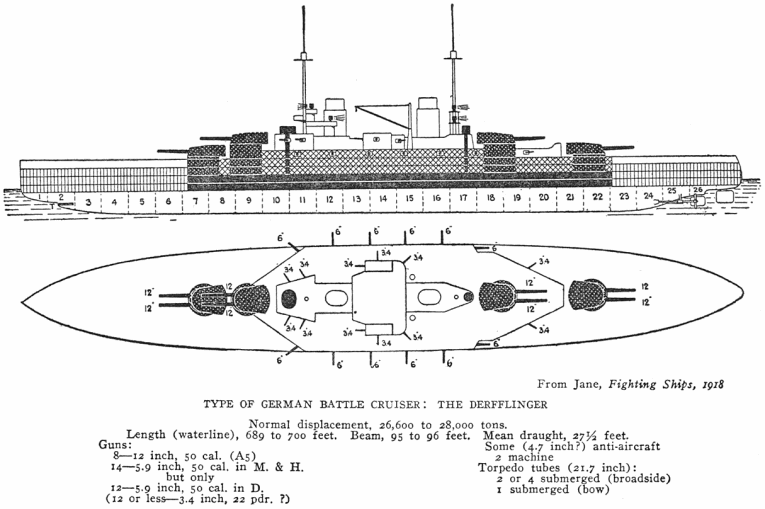
Plan and elevation view of the Derfflinger class, from Jane's Fighting Ships 1919

Derfflinger and Lützow were 210 m (690 ft) long at the waterline and 210.4 m (690 ft 3 in) long overall. Hindenburg was slightly longer, at 212.5 m (697 ft 2 in) at the waterline and 212.8 m (698 ft 2 in) overall. All three ships had a beam of 29 m (95 ft 2 in), and a draft of between 9.2 m (30 ft 2 in) forward and 9.57 m (31 ft 5 in) aft. The first two ships were designed to displace 26,600 t (26,200 long tons; 29,300 short tons) with a standard load, and up to 31,200 t (30,700 long tons; 34,400 short tons) at combat weight. Hindenburg displaced slightly more, at 26,947 t (26,521 long tons; 29,704 short tons) standard and 31,500 t (31,000 long tons; 34,700 short tons) fully laden. The ships' hulls were constructed from longitudinal steel frames, over which the outer hull plates were riveted. Derfflinger's hull contained sixteen watertight compartments, though Lützow and Hindenburg had an additional seventeenth compartment. All three ships had a double bottom that ran for 65% of the length of the hull. This was a decrease from preceding German battlecruisers, which had a double bottom for at least 75% of the hull.

The ships were regarded as excellent sea boats by the German navy. The Derfflinger-class ships were described as having had gentle motion, though they were "wet" at the casemate deck. Steering was controlled by a pair of rudders placed on the centerline. The ships lost up to 65% speed with the twin rudders hard over, and heeled up to 11 degrees. This was greater than any of the preceding battlecruiser designs, and as a result, anti-roll tanks were fitted to Derfflinger. (Note: Anti-roll tanks were fitted only to Derfflinger, because during the initial trials on the battlecruiser Von der Tann, the roll tanks were found to reduce rolling by only 33%. This was deemed to be an insufficient benefit to warrant the extra weight of the roll tanks. The roll tanks also required the removal of two secondary-battery guns.) the tanks were tested at sea in December 1914 with inconclusive results. The three ships had a metacentric height of 2.6 m (8 ft 6 in). The standard crew for one of the vessels was 44 officers and 1,068 men; when serving as the flagship for the I Scouting Group, the ships carried an additional 14 officers and 62 men. The Derfflingers carried smaller craft, including one picket boat, three barges, two launches, two yawls, and two dinghies.

=== Machinery ===
By the time construction work on Derfflinger began, it was determined that the diesel engine was not ready for use. Instead, the plan to use a three-shaft system was abandoned and the ships reverted to the standard four-shaft arrangement. Each of the three ships was equipped with two sets of marine-type turbines; each set drove a pair of 3-bladed screws that were 3.9 m (12 ft 10 in) in diameter on Derfflinger and Lützow and 4 m (13 ft 1 in) in diameter on Hindenburg. The starboard side screws turned to the right and the port side turned to the left to counteract any effect on the ships' steering. Each set consisted of a high- and low-pressure turbine—the high-pressure machines drove the outer shafts while the low-pressure turbines turned the inner pair. Steam was supplied to the turbines from 14 coal-fired marine-type double boilers and eight oil-fired marine-type double-ended boilers. Each ship was equipped with a pair of turbo-electric generators and a pair of diesel-electric generators that provided a total of 1,660 kilowatts at 220 volts. Each ship was equipped with two rudders.

The engines for first two ships were designed to provide 63,000 metric horsepower (62,000 shp), at 280 revolutions per minute. This would have given the two ships a top speed of 26.5 knots (49.1 km/h; 30.5 mph). During trials, Derfflinger's engines achieved 76,634 PS (75,586 shp), but a top speed of 25.5 knots (47.2 km/h; 29.3 mph). Due to the start of World War I, the ship's trials were conducted in shallower water, which reduced speed; it was expected that in deep water, her top speed would have been about 2 knots higher. Lützow's engines reached 80,988 PS (79,880 shp) and a top speed of 26.4 knots (48.9 km/h; 30.4 mph). Hindenburg's power plant was rated at 72,000 PS (71,000 shp) at 290 rpm, for a top speed of 27 knots (50 km/h; 31 mph). On trials she reached 95,777 PS (94,467 shp) and 26.6 knots (49.3 km/h; 30.6 mph). Derfflinger could carry 3,500 t (3,400 long tons) of coal and 1,000 t (980 long tons) of oil; at a cruising speed of 14 knots (26 km/h; 16 mph), she had a range of 5,600 nautical miles (10,400 km; 6,400 mi). Lützow carried 3,700 t (3,600 long tons) of coal and 1,000 tons of oil, though she had no advantage in range over her sister Derfflinger. Hindenburg also stored 3,700 tons of coal, as well as 1,200 t (1,200 long tons) of oil; her range at 14 knots was rated at 6,100 nautical miles (11,300 km; 7,000 mi).

=== Armament ===
Derfflinger's forward gun turrets

The Derfflinger-class ships were armed with eight 30.5 cm (12 in) SK L/50 guns (Note: In Imperial German Navy gun nomenclature, "SK" (Schnelladekanone) denotes that the gun is quick firing, while the L/50 denotes the length of the gun. In this case, the L/50 gun is 50 calibers, meaning that the gun barrel is 50 times as long as it is in diameter.) in four twin gun turrets, two forward of the main superstructure in a superfiring pair and two to the rear of the ship, in a similar arrangement. The guns were housed in C/1912 mounts on the first two ships, and in C/1913 mounts on Hindenburg. The turrets were trained with electric motors, while the guns were elevated hydraulically, up to 13.5 degrees. The guns fired 405.5-kilogram (894 lb) armor-piercing shells at a muzzle velocity of 855 meters per second (2,805 ft/s). At 13.5 degrees, the shells could hit targets out to 18,700 m (20,500 yd). After the Battle of Dogger Bank in January 1915, where British ships had been able to open fire first, outside the range of the German guns, the turrets were modified in 1916 to increase the elevation maximum to 16 degrees. This correspondingly increased the range to 20,500 m (22,400 yd). The ships carried 720 shells, or 90 per gun; each gun was supplied with 65 armor-piercing (AP) shells and 25 semi-AP shells for use against targets with less armor protection. The 30.5 cm gun had a rate of fire of between 2–3 shells per minute, and was expected to fire 200 shells before replacement was necessary. The guns were also capable of firing 405.9 kg (894.8 lb) high explosive shells. The shells were loaded with two RP C/12 propellant charges: a main charge in a brass cartridge that weighed 91 kg (201 lb) and a fore charge in a silk bag that weighed 34.5 kg (76 lb). The propellant magazines were located underneath the shell rooms for the two forward turrets as well as the rear superfiring turret; the arrangement was reversed for the rearmost turret.

The ships were designed to carry a secondary armament of fourteen 15 cm (5.9 in) SK L/45 guns, mounted in casemates along the superstructure. Because Derfflinger had to be fitted with anti-roll tanks, two of the casemated guns had to be removed, to allow enough room in the hull. Lützow and Hindenburg were equipped with the designed number of guns. Each gun was supplied with 160 rounds, and had a maximum range of 13,500 m (14,800 yd), though this was later extended to 16,800 m (18,400 yd). The guns had a sustained rate of fire of six to eight rounds per minute. The shells were 45.3 kg (99.8 lb). The guns fired at a muzzle velocity of 835 meters per second (2,740 ft/s).

The three ships carried a variety of 8.8 cm (3.5 in) SK L/45 guns in several configurations. The Derfflinger-class ships were initially equipped with eight of these weapons, all in single mounts; four were placed in the forward superstructure and four in the aft superstructure. The ships also carried four 8.8 cm Flak L/45 anti-aircraft guns, which were emplaced around the forward funnel, with the exception of Lützow, which carried the Flak guns around the rear funnel. After 1916, the four 8.8 cm guns in the forward superstructure were removed. The Flak guns were emplaced in C/13 pivot mountings, which allowed depression to −10 degrees and elevation to 70 degrees. These guns fired 10 kg (22 lb) shells.

The ships were also armed with submerged torpedo tubes in their hulls. Derfflinger was equipped with four 50 cm tubes; the later ships were armed with more powerful 60 cm weapons. The tubes were arranged with one in the bow, one in the stern, and two on the broadside. Derfflinger's 50 cm torpedoes were the G7 type, 7.02 m (276 in) long and armed with a 195 kg (430 lb) Hexanite warhead. The torpedo had a range of 4,000 m (4,370 yd) when set at a speed of 37 knots, and up to 9,300 m (10,170 yd) at 27 knots. The 60 cm torpedoes were the H8 type, which were 8 m long and carried a 210 kg (463 lb) Hexanite warhead. The torpedoes had a range of 6,000 m (6,550 yd) when set at a speed of 36 knots; at a reduced speed of 30 knots, the range increased significantly to 14,000 m (15,310 yd).

=== Armor ===
Cross section at Frame 161.

The Derfflinger-class ships were protected with Krupp cemented steel armor, as was the standard for German warships of the period. They had an armor belt that was 300 mm (11.8 in) thick in the central citadel of the ship, where the most important parts of the ship were. This included the ammunition magazines and the machinery spaces. The belt was reduced in less critical areas, to 120 mm (4.7 in) forward and 100 mm (3.9 in) aft. The belt tapered down to 30 mm (1.2 in) at the bow, though the stern was not protected by armor at all. A 45 mm (1.8 in) thick torpedo bulkhead ran the length of the hull, several meters behind the main belt. The main armored deck ranged in thickness from 30 mm thick in less important areas, to 80 mm (3.1 in) in the sections that covered the more critical areas of the ship.

The forward conning tower was protected with heavy armor: the sides were 300 mm thick and the roof was 130 mm (5.1 in) thick. The rear conning tower was less well armored; its sides were only 200 mm (7.9 in) thick and the roof was covered with 50 mm (2 in) of armor plate. The main battery gun turrets were also heavily armored: the turret sides were 270 mm (11 in) thick and the roofs were 110 mm (4.3 in) thick. On Hindenburg, the thickness of the turret roofs was increased to 150 mm (5.9 in). The 15 cm guns had 150 mm-worth of armor plating in the casemates; the guns themselves had 70 mm (2.8 in) thick shields to protect their crews from shell splinters.

== Construction ==
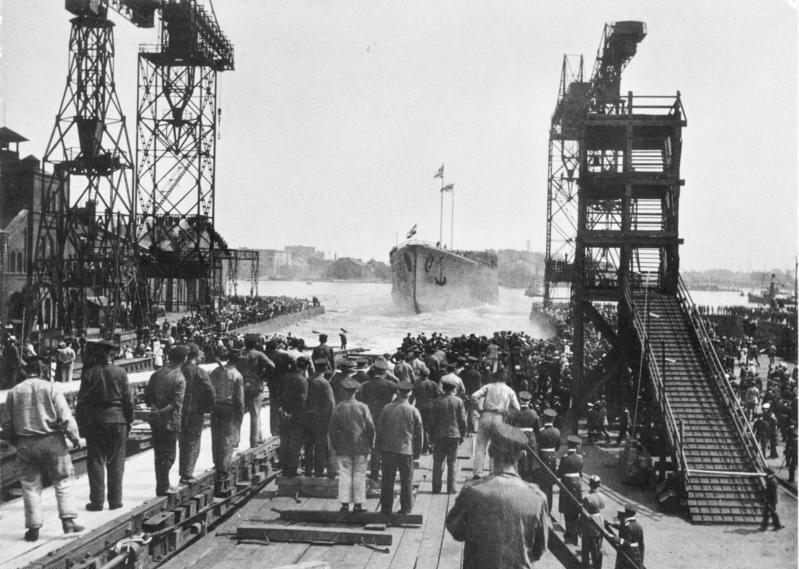
Hindenburg being launched, on 1 August 1915

Of the three ships in its class, only Derfflinger was ordered as an addition to the fleet, under the provisional name "K". The other two ships were to intended to replace obsolete vessels; Lützow was ordered as Ersatz Kaiserin Augusta for the elderly protected cruiser Kaiserin Augusta and the contract for Hindenburg was issued under the provisional name Ersatz Hertha, to replace the protected cruiser Hertha.

Derfflinger was constructed at Blohm & Voss in Hamburg under construction number 213. She was the least expensive of the three ships, at a cost of 56 million gold marks. The ship was ready to be launched on 14 June 1913, but during the ceremony, one of the wooden sledges upon which the hull rested became jammed. It took until 12 July for her to enter the water. She was commissioned into the High Seas Fleet on 1 September 1914, shortly after the outbreak of World War I. Lützow was built at the Schichau dockyard in Danzig under construction number 885, at the cost of 58 million gold marks. The ship was launched on 29 November 1913, and after lengthy trials, commissioned on 8 August 1915. Hindenburg, the final member of the class, was built at the Imperial Dockyard in Wilhelmshaven, under construction number 34. The ship was built at a cost of 59 million gold marks, the most expensive of the three vessels. She was launched on 1 August 1915 and commissioned on 10 May 1917.

== Ships of the class ==
Construction data
Name	Namesake	Builder	Laid down	Launched	Commissioned	Fate
Derfflinger	Georg von Derfflinger	Blohm & Voss, Hamburg	30 March 1912	17 July 1913	1 September 1914	Scuttled at Scapa Flow, 21 June 1919
Lützow	Ludwig Adolf Wilhelm von Lützow	Schichau-Werft, Danzig	15 May 1912	29 November 1913	8 August 1915	Scuttled following surface action, 1 June 1916
Hindenburg	Paul von Hindenburg	Kaiserliche Werft, Wilhelmshaven	1 October 1913	1 August 1915	10 May 1917	Scuttled at Scapa Flow, 21 June 1919

== Service history ==
=== SMS Derfflinger ===
Named after Georg von Derfflinger, a German field marshal during the Thirty Years' War, Derfflinger was commissioned on 1 September 1914. A dockyard crew transferred the ship from Hamburg to Kiel, via the Skagen. The ship was assigned to the I Scouting Group at the end of October. Damage to the ship's turbines sustained during trials prevented the ship from seeing active service until 16 November. On 15 December, the ship took part in the raid on Scarborough, Hartlepool and Whitby. She was also present during the battle of Dogger Bank on 24 January 1915. The ship was hit once by a 13.5-inch shell from one of the British battlecruisers; in response, she heavily damaged HMS Lion. Repair work was completed by 16 February, but Derfflinger's starboard turbine was accidentally damaged on 28 June, and the ship was again in the dockyard until August. On 24 April 1916, Derfflinger took part in the bombardment of Yarmouth.

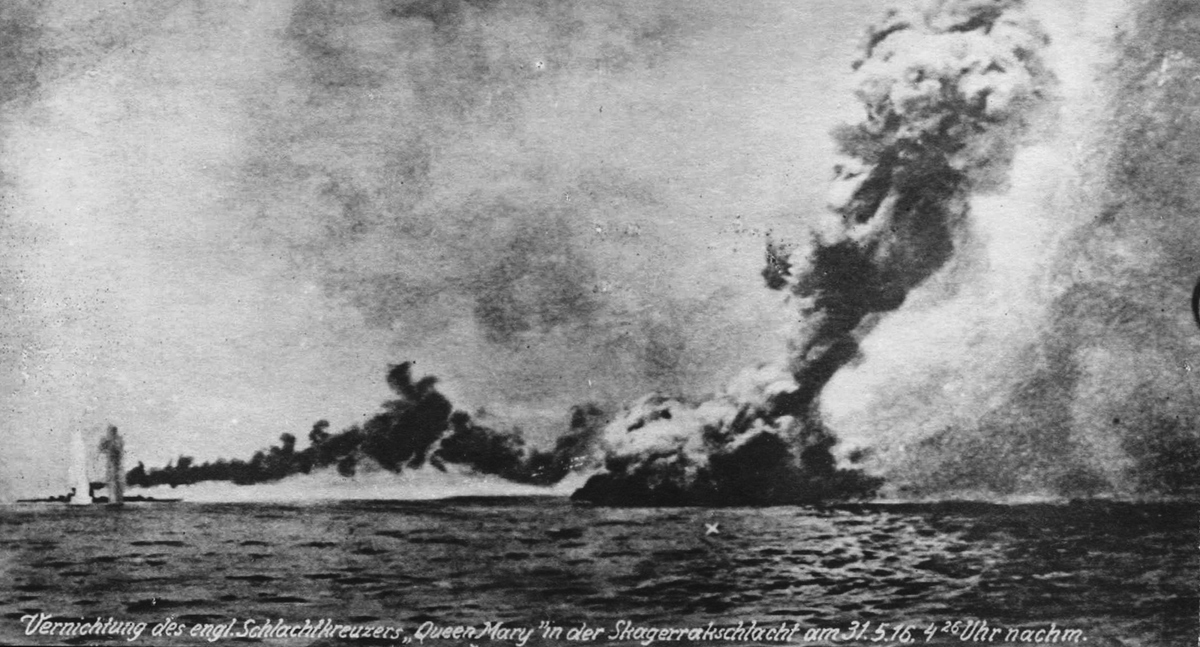
Queen Mary's magazines detonate

On 31 May, Derfflinger was heavily engaged during the Battle of Jutland, as the second ship in the German battlecruiser line. She sustained 21 major hits during the battle, but dealt considerable damage to the British battlecruiser force as well. At 16:26, HMS Queen Mary sank after a magazine explosion that tore the ship apart; she had been targeted with a hail of heavy-caliber gunfire from Derfflinger and Seydlitz. Two hours later, at 18:30, HMS Invincible suffered a similar fate, though Derfflinger was assisted by her sister Lützow. During the engagement, Derfflinger had both of her rear turrets knocked out by British gunfire. Her crew suffered 157 men killed and 26 wounded, which was the highest casualty figure for any German ship not sunk. The resilience of the vessel earned her the nickname "Iron Dog" from her British adversaries. Repair work lasted until 15 October, during which the ship had her pole mast removed and replaced with a tripod mast. The ship conducted training operations until November, at which point she returned to active duty with the fleet.

Following the German capitulation in November 1918, Derfflinger was interned with a significant portion of the High Seas Fleet in Scapa Flow. On 21 June 1919, with the guard ships of the Royal Navy out on maneuvers, Rear Admiral Ludwig von Reuter ordered that the fleet be scuttled. (Note: The Armistice was scheduled to expire at noon on 21 June 1919; by the 20th, it had been extended to 23 June. There is some contention as to whether Reuter was aware of this. Admiral Fremantle, the commander of the British fleet based in Scapa, stated that he informed Reuter on the evening of the 20th, though Reuter claims he was unaware of the development.) The resulting scuttling of the German fleet saw some 66 vessels of various types sunk. Among those was Derfflinger, which sank at 14:45. The ship was raised in 1939 to be broken up for scrap metal, but the outbreak of World War II intervened. The ship, which remained capsized, was anchored off the island of Risa until 1946, at which point she was sent to Faslane Port, where she was broken up. The ship's bell was delivered to the German Federal Navy on 30 August 1965.

=== SMS Lützow ===
Illustration of Lützow

Lützow was named after Ludwig Adolf Wilhelm von Lützow, a Prussian lieutenant-general who fought during the Napoleonic Wars. The ship was commissioned on 8 August 1915, and then underwent trials. On 25 October, while still running sea trials, Lützow's port low pressure turbine was severely damaged. She was sent to Kiel for repairs, which lasted until late January 1916. The ship went on additional trials that lasted until 19 February. Lützow was by then fully operational, and assigned to I Scouting Group on 20 March 1916. She took part in two fleet advances, on 25 March and 21–22 April, without any major incidents. The following day, on 23 April, Lützow, along with her sister Derfflinger and the battlecruisers Seydlitz, Moltke, and Von der Tann, bombarded Yarmouth. While en route to the target, Vice Admiral Franz von Hipper's flagship Seydlitz was heavily damaged by mines. As a result, Lützow was transferred to the role of squadron flagship. During the operation, the German battlecruisers encountered British light forces, and a running battle ensued. Lützow engaged the light cruiser HMS Conquest and hit her several times.

At the Battle of Jutland, she was the first ship in the German line, and Hipper's flagship, and drew fire from the British battlecruisers which included hits below her waterline. Shortly after the start of the battlecruiser action, Lützow hit her opponent Lion several times; one hit knocked out Lion's "Q" turret, and the resulting magazine fire nearly destroyed the ship. (Note: Only the quick action of Major Francis Harvey, who despite being mortally wounded ordered the magazine be flooded, prevented a flash fire.) Shortly after 19:00, the armored cruisers Defence and Warrior inadvertently ran into the German line; Lützow opened fire immediately, followed by several German dreadnoughts. In a hail of shells, Defence's ammunition magazines detonated and the ship was sunk. At around the same time, the fresh battlecruisers of the 3rd Battlecruiser Squadron engaged their German opposites. Between 19:26 and 19:34, Lützow sustained four 12-inch shell hits in her bow from the British battlecruisers; these eventually proved to be fatal. Despite this, at 19:30, the combined fire of Lützow and her sister Derfflinger destroyed the battlecruiser Invincible. By 20:15, Lützow had been hit five more times, including hits on her two forward turrets.

By 22:15, Lützow had shipped nearly 2,400 tons of water, and the ship was dangerously down by the bows. After midnight, attempts were made to steer the ship in reverse. This failed when the bow became submerged enough to bring the stern out of the water; by 02:20, the screws and both rudders were coming out of the water and the ship was no longer able to steer. The order to abandon ship was given, and at 02:47, Lützow was sunk by the torpedo boat G38. The ship was lost because the flooding in the bow could not be controlled; the forward pump system failed and the central system could not keep up with the rising water. The crew was picked up by four torpedo boats that had been escorting the crippled battlecruiser; during the battle the ship suffered 116 men killed.

=== SMS Hindenburg ===
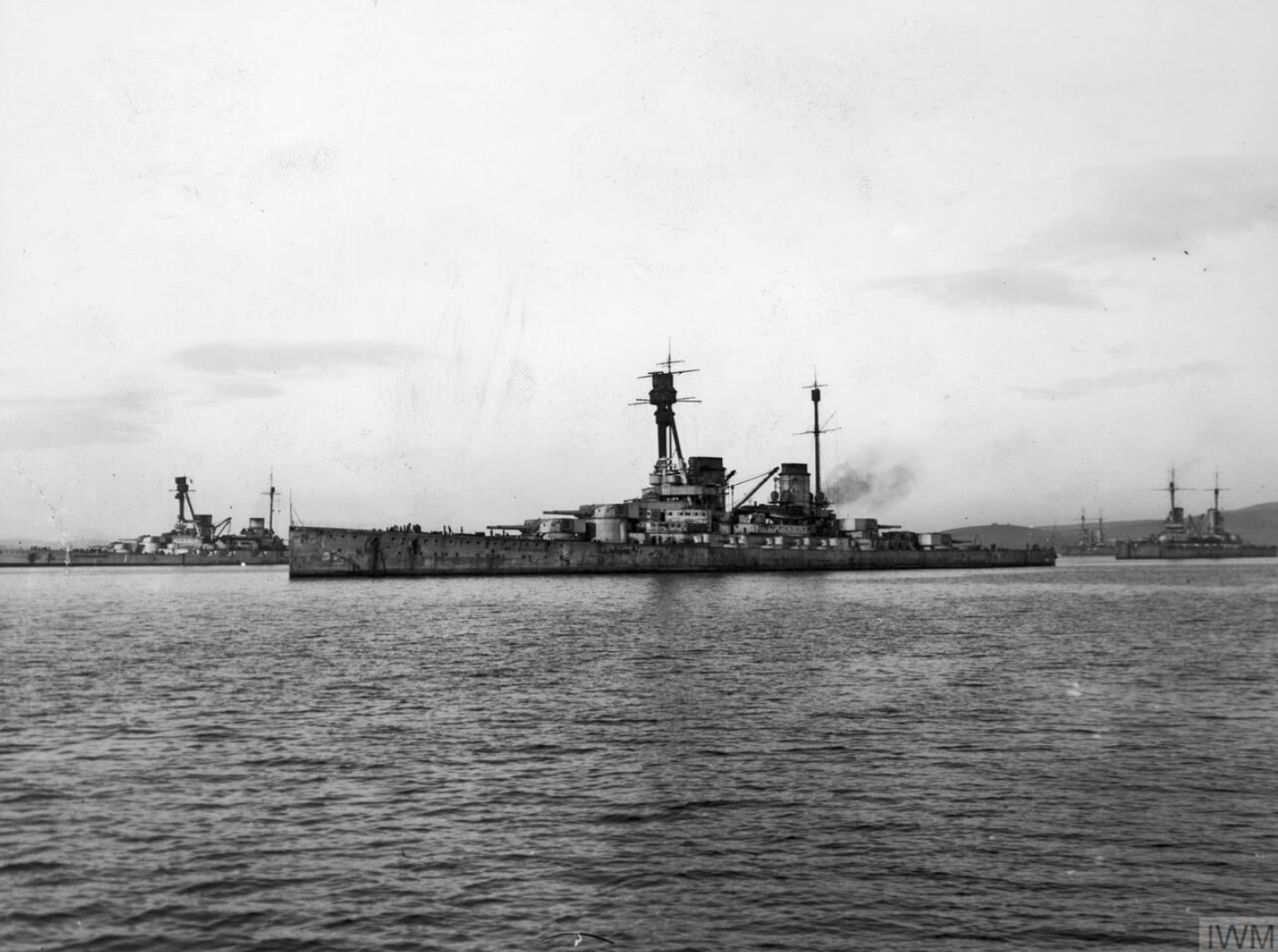
Hindenburg (center) and Derfflinger (left distance) moored in Scapa Flow

Hindenburg was the last battlecruiser completed for the Imperial German Navy, and as such had a very short career. She was commissioned 10 May 1917, and was fully operational by 20 October 1917, too late to see any major action in World War I. On 17 November Hindenburg and Moltke, along with the light cruisers of II Scouting Group, were acting as distant support for German minesweepers off the German coast when they were attacked by British battlecruisers. The raid was brief; by the time Hindenburg and Moltke arrived on the scene, the British ships had broken off the attack and withdrawn. Six days later, Hindenburg replaced Seydlitz as flagship of I Scouting Group. (Note: Seydlitz had resumed her duties as squadron flagship after the loss of Lützow at Jutland.) On 23 April 1918, the ship took part in an abortive fleet advance into the North Sea that attempted to intercept an Allied convoy. Moltke sustained mechanical damage while en route, and as a result, Vice Admiral Hipper decided to cancel the operation. On 11 August, Hipper was promoted to Admiral and given command of the entire High Seas Fleet. Rear Admiral Ludwig von Reuter replaced Hipper as the commander of I Scouting Group; he raised his flag on Hindenburg the following day.

Hindenburg was interned at Scapa Flow, along with her sister Derfflinger and the rest of the German battlecruisers. She was scuttled on 21 June 1919, and sank at 17:00. Several unsuccessful attempts to raise her were made; on 23 July 1930 the ship was finally raised. From 1930 to 1932 she was scrapped at Rosyth. Her bell was presented to the German Federal Navy on 28 May 1959.
