= Château de Wasselonne =

Castle in Bas-Rhin, Alsace, France

Coordinates: 48.6382°N 7.4458°E

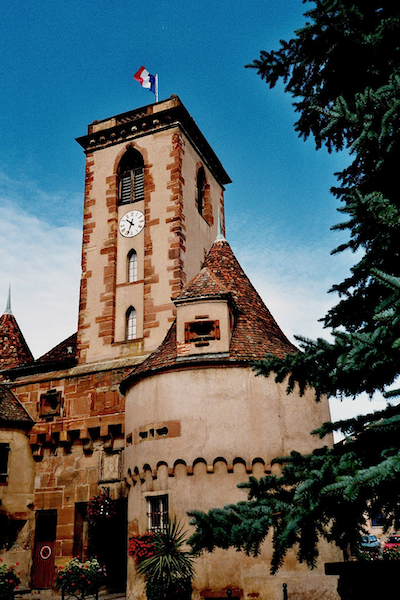
Castle Wasselonne

Château de Wasselonne is a castle in the commune of Wasselonne, in the department of Bas-Rhin, Alsace, France. Of the original medieval castle, only the entrance gate and the big artillery tower and some walls remain. It is a listed historical monument since 1932.
