= Wasselonne =

- Commune
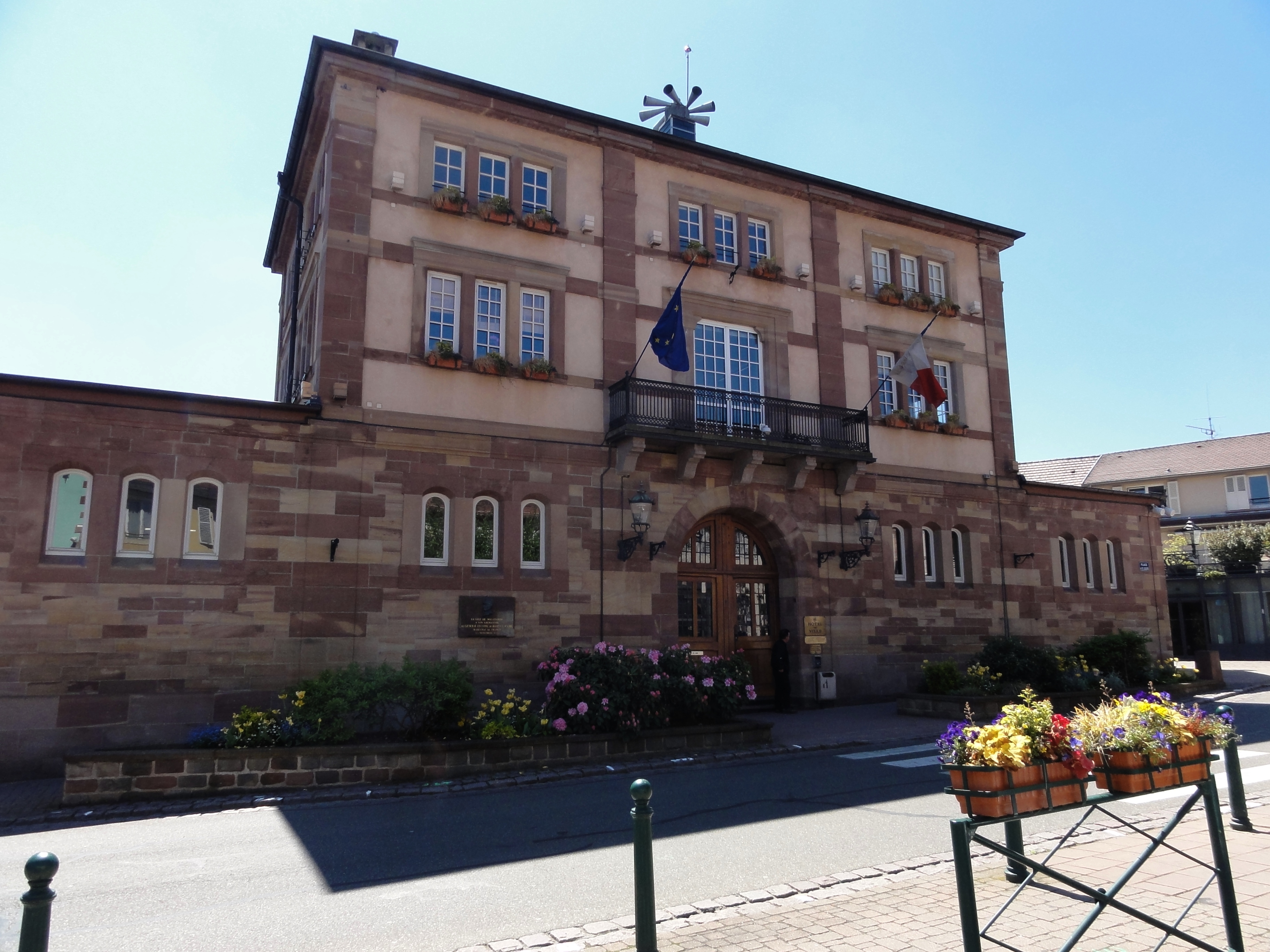
- The town hall in Wasselonne

- Coat of arms
- Location of Wasselonne
- Location within France Location within Grand Est
- Coordinates: 48°38′N 7°27′E
- Country: France
- Region: Grand Est
- Department: Bas-Rhin
- Arrondissement: Molsheim
- Canton: Saverne
- Intercommunality: Mossig et Vignoble

Government
  - Mayor (2020–2026): Michèle Eschlimann
- Area^{1}: 15 km^{2} (5.8 sq mi)
- Highest elevation: 380 m (1,250 ft)
- Lowest elevation: 195 m (640 ft)
- Population (2023): 5,780
  - Density: 390/km^{2} (1,000/sq mi)
- Time zone: UTC+01:00 (CET)
  - Summer (DST): UTC+02:00 (CEST)
- INSEE/Postal code: 67520 /67310
- ^{1} French Land Register data, which excludes lakes, ponds, glaciers > 1 km^{2} (0.386 sq mi or 247 acres) and river estuaries.

Wasselonne (French pronunciation: [vaslɔn]; German: Wasselnheim) is a commune based in the Bas-Rhin department in north-eastern France, more precisely, in the Grand Est region. The oldest firm of unleavened bread in France: Etablissements René Neymann, is located in this town.

== Population ==
Historical population
Year	Pop.	±% p.a.
1968	3,832	—
1975	4,172	+1.22%
1982	4,862	+2.21%
1990	4,916	+0.14%
1999	5,542	+1.34%
2007	5,571	+0.07%
2012	5,662	+0.32%
2017	5,652	−0.04%
2023	5,780	+0.37%
Source: INSEE

== Geography ==
Wasselonne is located in the Mossig valley, in the Vosges foothills, near the Alsace Wine Route.

The town train station is nowadays closed. A bicycle path has been built in the place of the former railway.

== History ==
In Roman times, Wasselonne was a vicus populated by the Triboci. The village was situated on the Durenberg hill and the left bank of the Mossig.

In the Merovingian period, Wasselonne prospered thanks to its proximity to Kirchheim, where a large and popular royal residence was established. During the 7th and 8th centuries, Wasselonne was certainly densely populated.

At the beginning of the 15th century, Wasselonne Castle was described as one of the most important fortresses in Lower Alsace. It was the seat of the bailiwick of Wasselonne. The stones used for its construction were extracted from the pink sandstone quarries of the Kronthal, identical to those used for the construction of Strasbourg cathedral.

In 1447, the Wasselonne War (1446-1448) pitted the Grand Chapter of Strasbourg against William, Count of Fénétrange and Walther von Dahn, who held the imperial fiefdom of Wasselonne from 1425 to 1483. Wasselonne was besieged and taken by the latter, then recaptured by Strasbourg troops who set fire to the castle in 1448.

The conflict officially ended when Walther von Dahn sold the castle and the village to the city of Strasbourg, in 1496, for 7,000 florins.

Between 1811 and 1919, Wasselonne was the second largest tanning centre in the Bas-Rhin, Strasbourg being the first one. It was overtaken by Barr during the next decades.

During the Second World War, eleven Jewish people from Wasselonne were deported by the Nazis and never returned from the extermination camps. To this list should be added the Protestant Henri Roederer who died in 1943. The only Jewish survivor of the camps is Jean Samuel, who died in 2010. He deported to the Auschwitz extermination camp with the writer Primo Levi, who made him the character of Pikolo in his book If This Is a Man.

== Monuments ==
Wasselonne is known for its castle, which has been partially destroyed in 1674. The remains of this munument, a big circular tower and a square tower, can still be seen nowadays.

== See also ==
- Communes of the Bas-Rhin department
