= SMS Hindenburg =

Battlecruiser of the German Imperial Navy

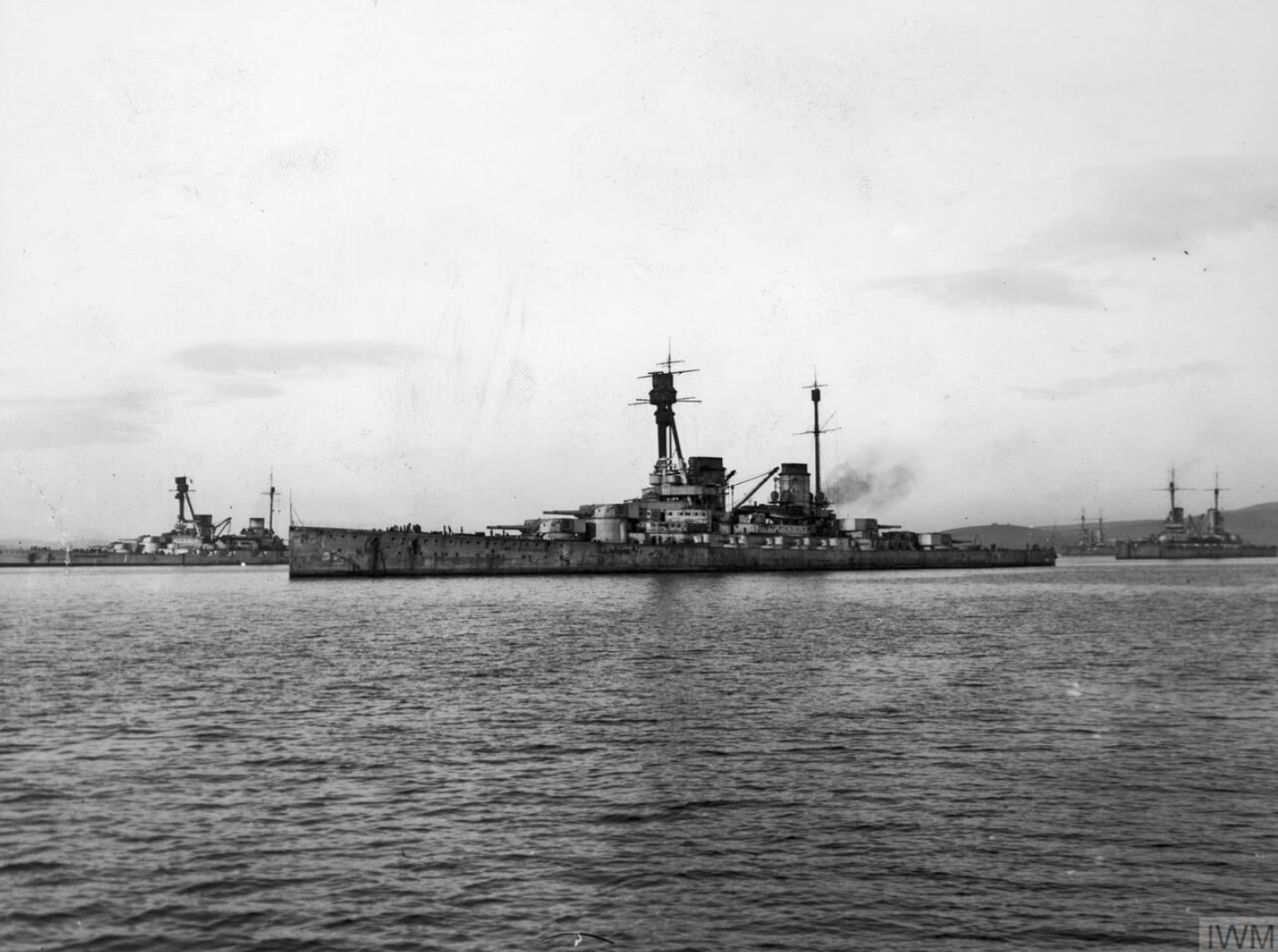
- Hindenburg at anchor at Scapa Flow

History

German Empire
- Name: Hindenburg
- Namesake: Paul von Hindenburg
- Ordered: 1912–1913 Naval Program
- Builder: Kaiserliche Werft, Wilhelmshaven
- Laid down: 1 October 1913
- Launched: 1 August 1915
- Commissioned: 10 May 1917
- Fate: Scuttled in Scapa Flow on 21 June 1919, wreck raised 1930, scrapped 1930–1932

General characteristics
- Class & type: Derfflinger-class battlecruiser
- Displacement: 26,947 t (26,521 long tons) normal load; 31,500 t (31,000 long tons) full load
- Length: 212.8 m (698 ft 2 in)
- Beam: 29 m (95 ft 2 in)
- Draft: 9.57 m (31 ft 5 in)
- Installed power: 18 × water-tube boilers; 72,000 metric horsepower (71,000 shp)
- Propulsion: 4 × Parsons steam turbines; 4 × screw propellers
- Speed: 27 knots (50 km/h; 31 mph)
- Range: 6,100 nmi (11,300 km; 7,000 mi) at 12 knots (22 km/h; 14 mph)
- Complement: 44 officers; 1,068 men
- Armament: 8 × 30.5 cm (12 in) SK L/50 guns; 14 × 15 cm (5.9 in) SK L/45 guns; 4 × 8.8 cm (3.5 in) SK L/45 guns; 4 × single 60 cm torpedo tubes
- Armor: Belt: 300 mm (11.8 in); Conning tower: 300 mm; Deck: 30 mm (1.2 in); Turret faces: 270 mm (10.6 in)
- Aircraft carried: 2 × seaplanes

SMS Hindenburg (Note: "SMS" stands for "Seiner Majestät Schiff", or "His Majesty's Ship" in German.) was a battlecruiser of the German Kaiserliche Marine (Imperial Navy), the third ship of the Derfflinger class, built to a slightly modified design. She was laid down in October 1913 and launched in August 1915. She carried the same battery of eight 30.5 cm (12 in) guns, but in improved turrets that allowed them to fire farther. The ship was also slightly larger and faster than her two sister ships. She was named in honor of Field Marshal Paul von Hindenburg, the victor of the Battle of Tannenberg and the Battle of the Masurian Lakes, as well as the supreme commander of the German armies from 1916. Construction of the ship was slowed after the start of World War I by shortages of material and manpower, the need to repair damaged ships, and shifting priorities. As a result, Hindenburg was the last capital ship of any type built for the German navy during the war, finally entering service in May 1917.

Hindenburg was commissioned late in the war and as a result had a brief service career. The ship took part in a handful of short fleet operations as the flagship of I Scouting Group in 1917–1918, though saw no major action with British forces. The proposed final sortie of the fleet in the last weeks of the war came to nothing when the crews of the capital ships mutinied. Following Germany's defeat in November 1918, Hindenburg was interned with the rest of the German battlecruisers at Scapa Flow in November 1918. Rear Admiral Ludwig von Reuter ordered the ships be scuttled on 21 June 1919, and Hindenburg was the last of the ships to sink. She was raised in 1930 and broken up for scrap over the following two years.

== Design ==
The Derfflinger class was authorized for the 1911 fiscal year as part of the 1906 naval law; design work had begun in early 1910. After their British counterparts had begun installing 34.3 cm (13.5 in) guns in their battlecruisers, senior officers in the German naval command came to the conclusion that an increase in the caliber of the main battery guns from 28 cm (11 in) to 30.5 cm (12 in) would be necessary. To keep costs from growing too quickly, the number of guns was reduced from ten to eight, compared to the earlier Seydlitz, but a more efficient superfiring arrangement was adopted. Hindenburg, the third and final member of the class, was allocated to the 1913 construction program. Though broadly identical to her two sisters, Hindenburg incorporated some incremental improvements, and as a result was slightly longer to maintain the same speed with an increased displacement.

=== Characteristics ===
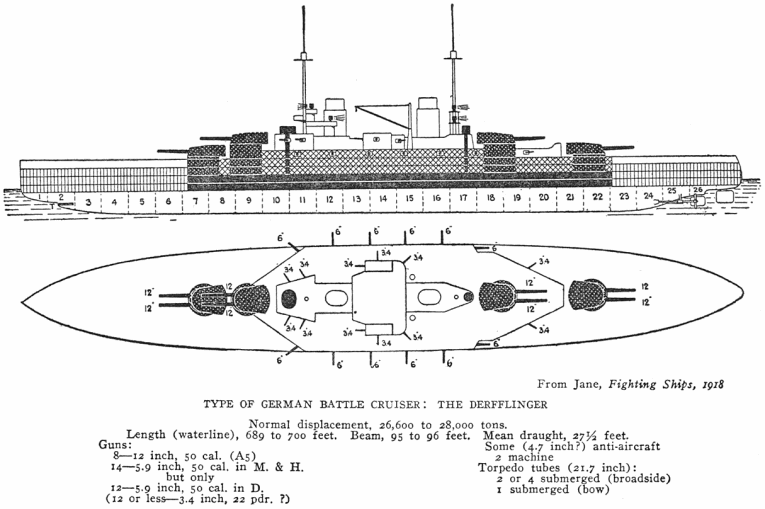
Plan of the Derfflinger-class battlecruiser, from Jane's Fighting Ships 1919

Hindenburg was slightly longer than her two sister ships, at 212.50 m (697 ft 2 in) at the waterline and 212.80 m (698 ft 2 in) overall. She had a beam of 29 m (95 ft 2 in), and a draft of between 9.20 m (30 ft 2 in) forward and 9.57 m (31 ft 5 in) aft. Hindenburg displaced 26,947 metric tons (26,521 long tons) normally and up to 31,500 t (31,000 long tons) fully laden. She had a crew of 44 officers and 1,068 men; when serving as the flagship for I Scouting Group, the ship carried an additional 14 officers and 62 men. Unlike her sisters, Hindenburg was completed with a tripod mast forward and a normal pole mast aft. The ship was fitted with a derrick to handle a pair of seaplanes that were carried abreast of the aft funnel.

Hindenburg was propelled by four sets of steam turbines driving four screws; steam was provided by fourteen coal-fired marine-type double boilers and eight oil-fired marine-type double-ended boilers. The propulsion system was rated at 72,000 metric horsepower (71,000 shp) for a top speed of 27 knots (50 km/h; 31 mph). During speed tests shortly after entering service in 1917, Hindenburg reached 26.67 knots (49.39 km/h; 30.69 mph) in shallow water; in deep water, this corresponded to a speed of about 27.5 knots (50.9 km/h; 31.6 mph). At a cruising speed of 14 knots (26 km/h; 16 mph), she had a range of 6,100 nautical miles (11,300 km; 7,000 mi).

Hindenburg's primary armament was eight 30.5 cm guns in four twin turrets, the same as in her two sisters. However, the gun turrets were Drh LC/1913 mounts, which were an improved version the Drh LC/1912 type mounts on Derfflinger and Lützow—the gun houses on Hindenburg allowed gun elevation to 16°, as opposed to 13.5° in the earlier model. This gave the guns mounted in the Drh LC/1913 turrets a range advantage of some 2,000 m (2,200 yd) over those in the older model turret. (Note: The Drh CL/1912 mounts were modified in 1916 to increase their maximum elevation to 16°.) Like her sister ship, Lützow, she was armed with a secondary battery of fourteen 15 cm (5.9 in) SK L/45 guns and four 60 cm (23.6 in) torpedo tubes instead of the standard twelve 15 cm guns and four 50 cm (19.7 in) tubes mounted on Derfflinger.

Hindenburg was protected by an armor belt that was 300 mm (11.8 in) thick in the central citadel of the ship where it protected the ammunition magazines and propulsion machinery spaces. Her deck was 30 to 80 mm (1.2 to 3.1 in) thick, with the thicker armor sloping down at the sides to connect to the lower edge of the belt. Her main battery turrets had 270 mm (10.6 in) thick faces. Her secondary casemates received 150 mm (5.9 in) of armor protection. The forward conning tower, where the ship's commander controlled the vessel, had 300 mm of armor plate on the sides.

== Service history ==
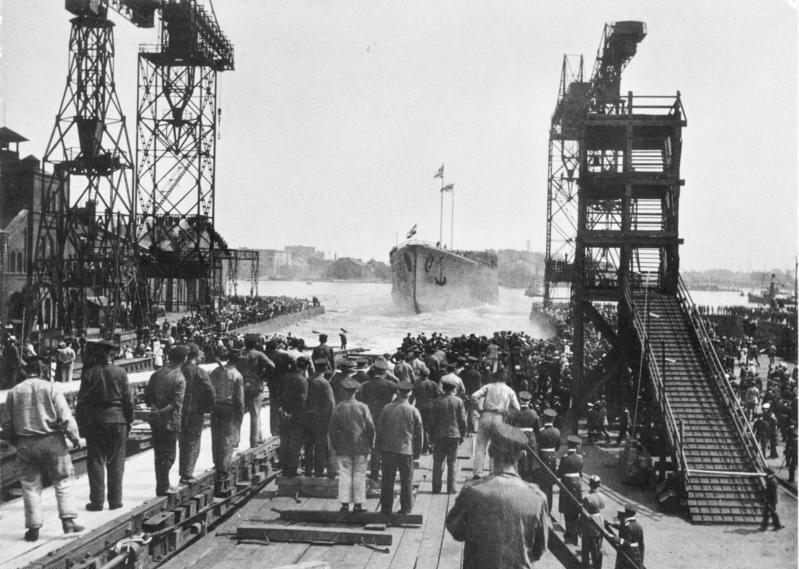
Launch of Hindenburg, 1 August 1915

Built by the Kaiserliche Werft at their shipyard in Wilhelmshaven, Hindenburg was the third and final ship of her class; her sister ships were Derfflinger and Lützow. Designed as a replacement for the elderly protected cruiser Hertha, Hindenburg's keel was laid down on 30 June 1913 under the provisional designation "Ersatz Hertha". (Note: German warships were ordered under provisional names. Additions to the fleet were given a single letter; ships intended to replace older or lost vessels were ordered as "Ersatz (name of the ship to be replaced)".) After World War I broke out in July 1914, work on the ship was delayed so that existing warships in the reserve fleet could be mobilized for the conflict. Hindenburg was launched on 1 August 1915 and named for General Paul von Hindenburg, but due to shifting construction priorities in time of war, work proceeded slowly. The reasons included shortages of material and workers, the prioritization of repairs to existing ships (which the Battle of Jutland considerably exacerbated), and the decision to adopt unrestricted submarine warfare, which saw a redirection of resources from surface warships to U-boat construction. Work on Hindenburg continued, however, since the High Seas Fleet was short of battlecruisers, particularly following the loss of Lützow at Jutland.

In April 1917, Hindenburg was lightly rammed by the dreadnought battleship Helgoland while the latter vessel exited a nearby dry dock, but she was not significantly damaged. The new battlecruiser was finally commissioned on 10 May, the last capital ship to be commissioned by the imperial fleet. The ship was initially under the command of Kapitän zur See (KzS—Captain at Sea) Johannes von Karpf. By that time it was too late for her to see any significant operations in World War I. At the time, British naval intelligence mistakenly believed the ship was commissioned so late because she had had parts removed to repair Derfflinger after the battle of Jutland in June 1916. Hindenburg conducted sea trials from her commissioning until 20 August, at which time she was sent to conduct initial crew training for two months. In early October, Hindenburg cruised in the Bay of Mecklenburg with the battlecruisers Seydlitz, Derfflinger, and Von der Tann, and then conducted torpedo training with the battleship Baden.

Hindenburg sailed from Kiel to Wilhelmshaven on 25 October, and was declared fully operational the following day. The next month, KzS Hans Eberius replaced Karpf as the ship's captain. From 4 to 9 November, Hindenburg patrolled in the German Bight to support the light forces patrolling the Germans' defensive minefields. On 17 November, Hindenburg and Moltke, along with the light cruisers of II Scouting Group, were acting as distant support for German minesweepers off the German coast when the minesweepers were attacked by British warships. The British raiders included the new battlecruisers Repulse, Courageous, and Glorious. However, the raid was brief; by the time Hindenburg and Moltke arrived on the scene, the British ships had broken off the attack and withdrawn. The next day, Hindenburg and the rest of I Scouting Group went to sea again with a group of torpedo boats to clear buoys that had been set to mark the entrances to the minefields. The ships completed their task and returned to port later that evening without incident.

On 23 November, Hindenburg replaced Seydlitz as flagship of I Scouting Group, under the command of Franz von Hipper. During this period, Hipper spent little time aboard the ship, instead operating from the light cruiser Niobe, since he was also responsible for the defense of the German Bight, and Hindenburg was not required to patrol. Hipper only returned to his designated flagship when the entire I Scouting Group went to sea. Hindenburg was taken into a floating dry dock in Wilhelmshaven for repairs from 11 to 13 December. The ship next went to sea with Moltke, the light cruiser Emden, and two torpedo boats for patrol duties in the bight that lasted from 21 to 23 December. Another stint on the patrol line followed from 22 to 23 January 1918. Five days later, KzS Walter Hildebrand took command of the ship. February and March followed a similar pattern, with most of the ship's time spent on patrol duty, punctuated with brief stints in dry dock for maintenance and alterations.

=== Advance of 23 April 1918 ===
In late 1917, light forces of the High Seas Fleet began interdicting British convoys to Norway. (Note: Britain had promised to ship 250,000 short tons (230,000 t) of coal to Norway every month.) On 17 October the light cruisers Brummer and Bremse intercepted one of the convoys, sinking nine of the twelve cargo ships and the two escorting destroyers—Mary Rose and Strongbow—before turning back to Germany. On 12 December, four German destroyers ambushed a second British convoy of five cargo vessels and two British destroyers. All five transports were sunk, as was one of the destroyers. Following these two raids, Admiral David Beatty, the commander of the Grand Fleet, detached battleships from the battle fleet to protect the convoys. The German navy was now presented with an opportunity for which it had been waiting the entire war: a portion of the numerically stronger Grand Fleet was separated and could be isolated and destroyed. Hipper planned the operation: the battlecruisers of I Scouting Group, along with light cruisers and destroyers, would attack one of the large convoys, while the rest of the High Seas Fleet would stand by, ready to attack the British dreadnought battleship squadron.

At 05:00 on 23 April 1918, the German fleet, with Hindenburg in the lead, departed from the Schillig roadstead. Hipper ordered wireless transmissions be kept to a minimum, to prevent British intelligence from receiving radio intercepts. At 06:10 the German battlecruisers had reached a position approximately 60 kilometers southwest of Bergen, when Moltke lost her inner starboard propeller. Without resistance from the water, the propeller-less shaft began spinning faster and faster, until one of the engine gears flew apart. Shrapnel from the broken machinery damaged several boilers and tore a hole in the hull; the ship was dead in the water. The ship's crew effected temporary repairs, which allowed the ship to steam at 4 knots (7.4 km/h; 4.6 mph). However, it was decided to take the ship under tow by the battleship Oldenburg. Despite this setback, Hipper continued northward. By 14:00, Hipper's force had crossed the convoy route several times but had found nothing. At 14:10, Hipper turned his ships southward. By 18:37, the German fleet had made it back to the defensive minefields surrounding their bases. It was later discovered that the convoy had left port a day later than expected by the German planning staff.

=== Later operations ===
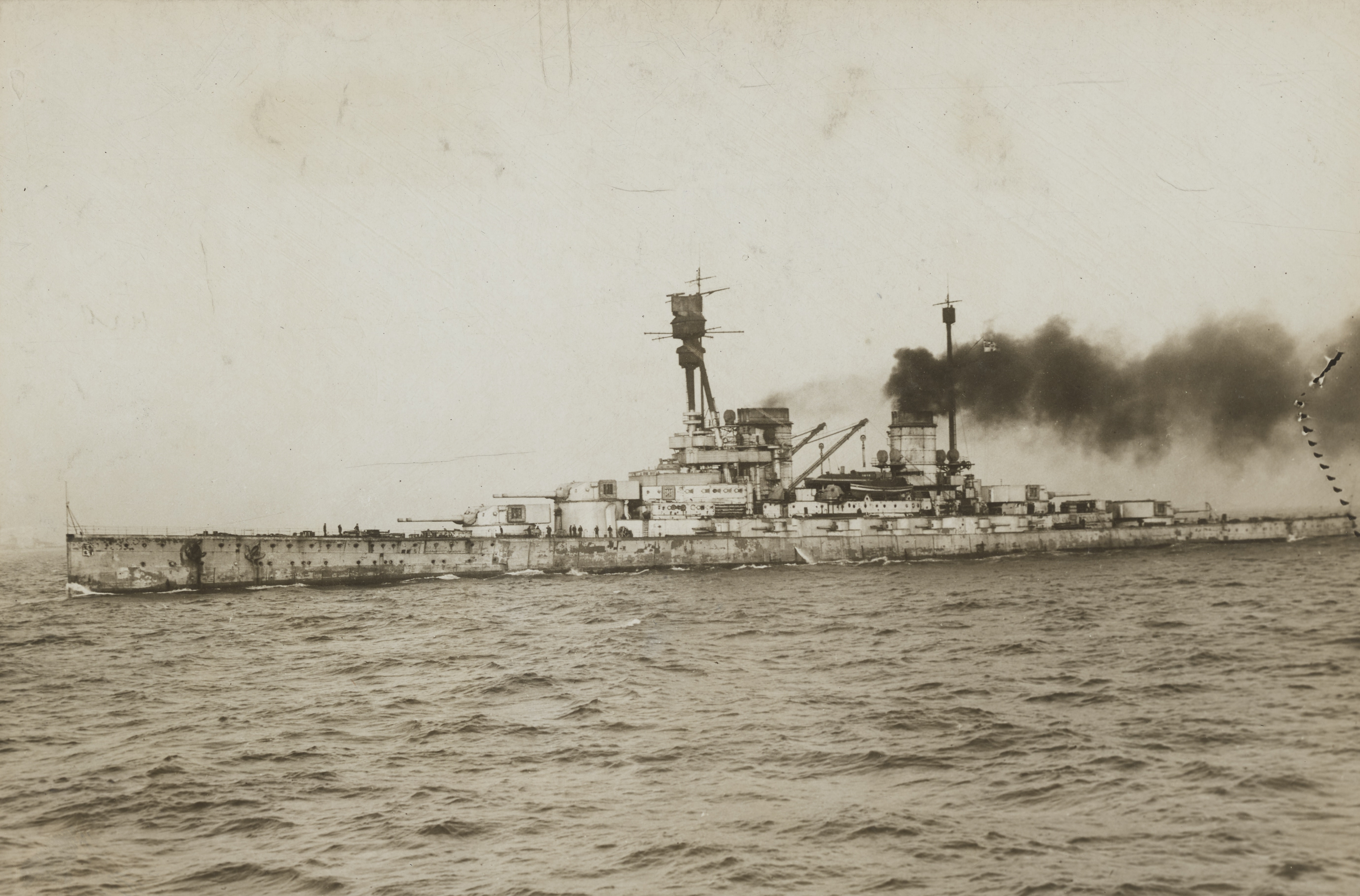
Hindenburg steams to Scapa Flow

On 27 April, Hindenburg returned to patrol duties in the bight. An operation to cover the laying of a defensive minefield took place on 10 May. Another series of minesweeping patrols occurred from 25 to 29 May, and Hindenburg was part of the distant support force. On 30 May, the battlecruisers moved to Kiel for training exercises that lasted until 17 June. They thereafter returned to the North Sea and resumed patrols in the bight. Hindenburg, Seydlitz, and the cruisers of II Scouting Group covered another minesweeping operation from 1 to 2 July. Repairs to the ship's propeller shafts were carried out from 8 to 18 July. Hipper returned to Hindenburg on 29 July for an operation to cover a major minesweeping operation to clear a path for U-boats through British minefields. The ships returned to port on the morning of 1 August. The ships went to sea again the next morning to complete the path through the minefields, which lasted into the following day. Reports of British naval forces in the southern North Sea prompted Hindenburg to sail for the Schillig roadstead on 11 August to be prepared to intercept them, but the ship later returned to Wilhelmshaven without incident. That evening, Hipper was promoted to Admiral and given command of the entire High Seas Fleet. Rear Admiral Ludwig von Reuter replaced Hipper as the commander of I Scouting Group; he raised his flag on Hindenburg the following day.

For the rest of August and through September, Hindenburg conducted short training exercises off Helgoland, including day and night shooting practice, in addition to her routine patrol operations. A short period of maintenance lasted from 29 September to 3 October, after which Hindenburg returned to operate with I Scouting Group. The battlecruiser group, less Moltke, went to sea again on 22 October to cover minesweepers, this time with the assistance of reconnaissance aircraft provided by the seaplane tender Santa Elena. The ships returned to port the next day.

Hindenburg was to have taken part in what would have amounted to the "death ride" of the High Seas Fleet in late October, shortly before the end of World War I. The bulk of the High Seas Fleet was to have sortied from their base in Wilhelmshaven to engage the Grand Fleet; Admiral Reinhard Scheer intended to inflict as much damage as possible on the British navy, to achieve a better bargaining position for Germany whatever the cost to the fleet. The plan involved two simultaneous attacks by light cruisers and destroyers, one on Flanders and another on shipping in the Thames estuary; Hindenburg and the other four battlecruisers were to support the Thames attack. After both strikes, the fleet was to concentrate off the Dutch coast, where it would meet the Grand Fleet in battle. While the fleet was consolidating in Wilhelmshaven, war-weary sailors began deserting en masse. As Von der Tann and Derfflinger passed through the locks that separated Wilhelmshaven's inner harbor and roadstead, some 300 men from both ships climbed over the side and disappeared ashore.

Hindenburg at Scapa Flow

On 24 October 1918, the order was given to sail from Wilhelmshaven. Starting on the night of 29 October, sailors on several battleships mutinied; three ships from III Battle Squadron refused to weigh anchors, and acts of sabotage were committed on board the battleships Thüringen and Helgoland. In the face of open rebellion, the order to sail was rescinded and the planned operation was abandoned. In an attempt to suppress the mutiny, the High Seas Fleet squadrons were dispersed.

=== Fate ===
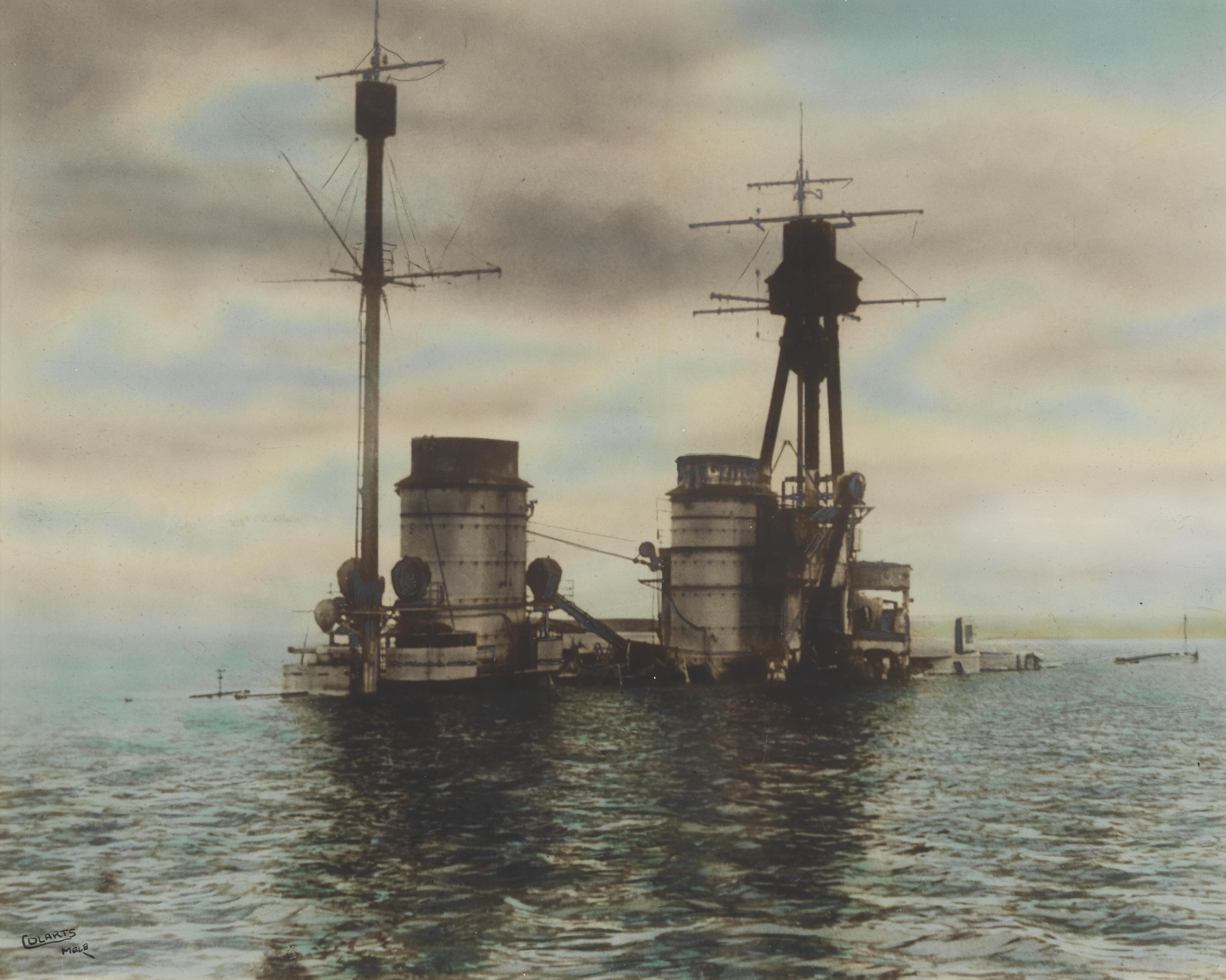
Wreck of Hindenburg in Scapa Flow, 1919

Under the terms of the Armistice between Germany and the Allies that ended World War I, the majority of the German fleet was to be interned at Scapa Flow; this included Hindenburg and the rest of the battlecruisers. On 21 November 1918, the ships to be interned—fourteen capital ships, seven light cruisers, and fifty of the most modern torpedo boats—departed German waters for what would prove to be the last time. Prior to the departure of the German fleet, Admiral Adolf von Trotha made clear to Reuter, who was given command of the ships to be interned, that he could not allow the Allies to seize the ships, under any conditions. The fleet rendezvoused with the British light cruiser Cardiff, which led the ships to the Allied fleet that was to escort the Germans to Scapa Flow. The massive flotilla consisted of some 370 British, American, and French warships.

The fleet initially stopped in the Firth of Forth on 21 November, from which they were sent in smaller groups to Scapa Flow. On 24 November, Hindenburg, the other battlecruisers, and several destroyers were moved, arriving in Scapa Flow the next day. Beginning on 3 December, German merchant ships arrived to slowly reduce the crews of the ships to only those needed to maintain the vessels. Over the following week and a half, some 15,000 men were repatriated, leaving less than 5,000 sailors and officers as skeleton crews. During this period, Hindenburg was commanded by Korvettenkapitän (Corvette Captain) Erich Heyden.

The fleet remained in captivity during the negotiations in Versailles that ultimately produced the treaty that ended the war. A copy of The Times informed Reuter that the Armistice was to expire at noon on 21 June 1919, the deadline by which Germany was to have signed the peace treaty. Reuter came to the conclusion that the British intended to seize the German ships after the Armistice expired. (Note: By this time, the Armistice had been extended to 23 June, though there is some contention as to whether Reuter was aware of this. Admiral Sydney Fremantle stated that he informed Reuter on the evening of the 20th, though Reuter claims he was unaware of the development.) To prevent this, he decided to scuttle his ships at the first opportunity. On the morning of 21 June, the British fleet left Scapa Flow to conduct training maneuvers; at 11:20 Reuter transmitted the order to his ships. Hindenburg was the last ship to sink, at 17:00. Her captain had deliberately arranged that the ship sank on an even keel to make it easier for her crew to escape.

The British initially intended to leave the wrecks where they sank, but they quickly determined that they would be hazards to navigation. In 1920, the government began selling off salvage rights, and in January 1924, the firm Cox & Danks Shipbreaking Co. bought the rights to Hindenburg and several other vessels. After several unsuccessful attempts, she was raised on 23 July 1930, and then sold later that year to Metal Industries. The ship was then towed to Rosyth to be scrapped, arriving on 27 August. Demolition work was carried out between 1930 and 1932. According to the naval historians Hans Hildebrand, Albert Röhr, and Hans-Otto Steinmetz, the ship's bell was returned to Germany aboard the light cruiser HMS Neptune on 17 August 1936, and it was later hung aboard the heavy cruiser Deutschland, but Erich Gröner disagrees, stating that the bell was presented to the Bundesmarine (Federal Navy) on 28 May 1959.
