= Hexanite =

Obsolete military high explosive

Hexanite was a castable German military explosive developed early in the 20th century before the First World War for the Kaiserliche Marine, intended to augment supplies of trinitrotoluene (TNT), which were then in short supply. Hexanite is slightly less powerful than TNT on its own. The most common hexanite formula (by weight) was 60% TNT and 40% hexanitrodiphenylamine.

Typically, hexanite was used in underwater naval weapons e.g. warheads for the G7a and G7e series torpedoes and the 300-kilogram (660 lb) main explosive charge in aluminium-cased buoyant, moored "EMF" magnetic mines capable of being laid by U-boats in 200, 300, or 500 metres (110, 160, or 270 fathoms) of water.

This explosive is regarded as obsolete, so any hexanite-filled munitions encountered will be in the form of unexploded ordnance dating from the Second World War.

The Japanese used this in World War II as explosive compound types 97 and 98.

== See also ==
- Minol
- Torpex
- Amatol
