= Ersatz Monarch-class battleship =

Austro-Hungarian dreadnought class

- A line drawing of the Ersatz Monarch-class battleship.

Class overview
- Name: Ersatz Monarch class (Note: For political and traditional purposes, the Marinekommandant designated all of his proposed ships to the Austrian and Hungarian parliaments with the prefix "Ersatz" ("replacement"). As the dreadnoughts were intended to replace the Monarch class coastal defense ships, they were referred as the "Ersatz Monarch class". Had they been constructed, the class and each of the ships which were to comprise it would have been given formal names. (see Fitzsimons Volume 8 p. 854))
- Builders: Stabilimento Tecnico Triestino, Trieste; Ganz-Danubius, Fiume
- Operators: Austro-Hungarian Navy
- Preceded by: Tegetthoff class
- Cost: 81,600,000–83,000,000 Kronen per battleship (Note: Different figures have been offered for the cost of the battleships. Vego places the average cost per ship at 81.6 million Kronen, while Fitzsimons states the ships would have cost between 82 and 83 million Kronen.)
- Planned: 4
- Canceled: 4

General characteristics
- Type: Battleship
- Displacement: 24,500 tonnes (24,100 long tons)
- Length: 172 m (564 ft 4 in) (waterline)
- Beam: 28.5 m (93 ft 6 in)
- Draft: 8.4 m (27 ft 7 in)
- Installed power: 15 Yarrow boilers; 31,000 shp (23,000 kW)
- Propulsion: 4 shafts; 4 steam turbine sets
- Speed: 21 knots (39 km/h; 24 mph)
- Range: 5,000 nmi (9,300 km; 5,800 mi) at 10 knots (19 km/h; 12 mph)
- Crew: 1,050 to 1,100 officers and men
- Armament: 2 × triple, 2 × twin 35 cm (14 in) guns; 14 × single 15 cm (5.9 in) guns; 8 × single 9 cm (3.5 in) guns; 2 × single 47 mm (1.9 in) guns; 8 or 12 × single 9 cm (3.5 in) AA guns; 5 or 6 × 53.3 cm (21 in) torpedo tubes
- Armor: Belt: 140 to 310 mm (5.5 to 12.2 in); Casemates: 150 mm (5.9 in); Turrets: 80 to 340 mm (3.1 to 13.4 in); Conning tower: 320 mm (12.6 in); Deck: 36 to 72 mm (1.4 to 2.8 in)

The Ersatz Monarch class (also informally known as the Improved Tegetthoff class) was a class of four dreadnought battleships which were intended to be built between 1914 and 1919 for the Austro-Hungarian Navy (kaiserliche und königliche Kriegsmarine). Design work on a class of battleships to succeed the Tegetthoff class and replace the aging Monarch class began in 1911. After going through several different design proposals, Anton Haus, Commander-in-Chief of the Austro-Hungarian Navy, secured passage of a naval expansion program through the Austro-Hungarian government to fund the construction of the battleships in April 1914.

Work on the first battleship was scheduled to begin a few months later, with the final ship was expected to be launched in mid-1919. However, the assassination of Archduke Franz Ferdinand on 28 June halted work just days before the keel of the first ship in the class was scheduled to be laid down. With the start of World War I a month later, construction on the ships was postponed until September, when the war with Serbia was expected to be over. The Hungarian government attempted to cancel the ships in October, but it was agreed in February 1915 that any work on the battleships would be indefinitely suspended until the end of the war. The ships were eventually canceled in 1917 as the war entered its third year, although some of the guns ordered for them were completed and saw service.

== Background ==
Austro-Hungarian fleet maneuvers in 1914

On 22 February 1913, Rudolf Montecuccoli retired as Commander-in-Chief of the Navy (Marinekommandant) and Chief of the Naval Section of the War Ministry (Chef der Marinesektion). His successor was Admiral Anton Haus, who inherited an Austro-Hungarian Navy which had grown to be the sixth-largest navy in Europe and the eighth-largest navy in the world. At the time of Haus' promotion, it was approaching its goal of 16 battleships, which Montecuccoli had outlined in a memorandum to Emperor Franz Joseph I in January 1909. However, this number included three obsolete 20-year-old "battleships" of the Monarch class, which had been long since relegated to the role of coastal defense ships. By 1913, Austria-Hungary's latest class of battleships, the Tegetthoff class, were nearing completion and each ship was almost four times the size of the Monarch class.

The need to replace the aging Monarch-class ships had presented itself prior to Haus' promotion of a new class. In October 1912, Montecuccoli had petitioned for two dreadnought battleships to succeed the Monarch class. In March 1913, Carl von Bardolff, Chief-of-Staff to Archduke Franz Ferdinand, suggested to Haus that he explore the option of constructing a "second dreadnought division". Bardolff was acting on Franz Ferdinand's orders, who had a keen interest in expanding the navy since being named an admiral in 1902. Ferdinand's plan was for this new class of dreadnoughts to replace the Monarch class, and he wished to have the new class laid down as soon as possible in order to keep Austria-Hungary's shipyards busy with new construction contracts. Like the Tegetthoff class before, several major shipbuilding enterprises in Austria-Hungary such as the Witkowitz Ironworks, the Škoda Works, Stabilimento Tecnico Triestino, and the Creditanstalt Bank, all offered to begin construction on a new class dreadnoughts at their own financial risk before any budget from the Austrian and Hungarian parliaments passed the additional funds necessary to pay for the new ships. By the spring of 1913, Ferdinand and Bardolff had also obtained bank loans to fund the project on behalf of the navy until a formal budget could be passed.

=== Proposals ===
The construction of the Tegetthoff-class battleships had already begun in 1910 when Škoda made the first of many attempts to obtain approval for a new generation of superdreadnoughts to replace the aging Monarch-class ships. The original proposal, laid forth on 18 April 1911, consisted of a class of ships which would contain 34.5-centimeter (13.6 in) guns with three guns each in two superimposed turrets.

The Austro-Hungarian Naval Technical Committee (Marinetechnische Komitee (MTK)) later submitted three proposals by naval architect Franz Pitzinger, Constructor General (Generalschiffbauingenieur) of the Austro-Hungarian Navy, on the general characteristics of the new class in December 1911. The first of the three proposals called for a 22,000-metric-ton (21,653-long-ton) battleship with 30.5-centimeter (12.0 in) guns. A later proposal had the new class displacing 23,000 metric tons (22,637 long tons) and equipped with 35-centimeter (13.8 in) guns. The last proposal had the battleship weighing as much as 24,500 metric tons (24,100 long tons). The final decision on the size and number of the main guns was to be a modified and slightly larger version of the original proposal by Škoda, with the main turrets to be equipped with 35-centimeter guns. The final decision for the main turrets' caliber was influenced by the Imperial German Navy, which had adopted this caliber on its new Mackensen-class battlecruisers.

By January 1913, the MTK delivered its first official proposal for the new Ersatz Monarch-class battleships. The committee decided to choose the largest of the three initial proposals, with each ship displacing roughly 24,100 metric tons (23,719 long tons). The battleships were to be armed with a total of ten 35-centimeter, eighteen 15-centimeter (5.9 in) and twenty-two 9-centimeter (3.5 in) guns. It took another year and a half for Haus to secure the necessary funding and for this final design to be formally approved in July 1914.

== Funding ==
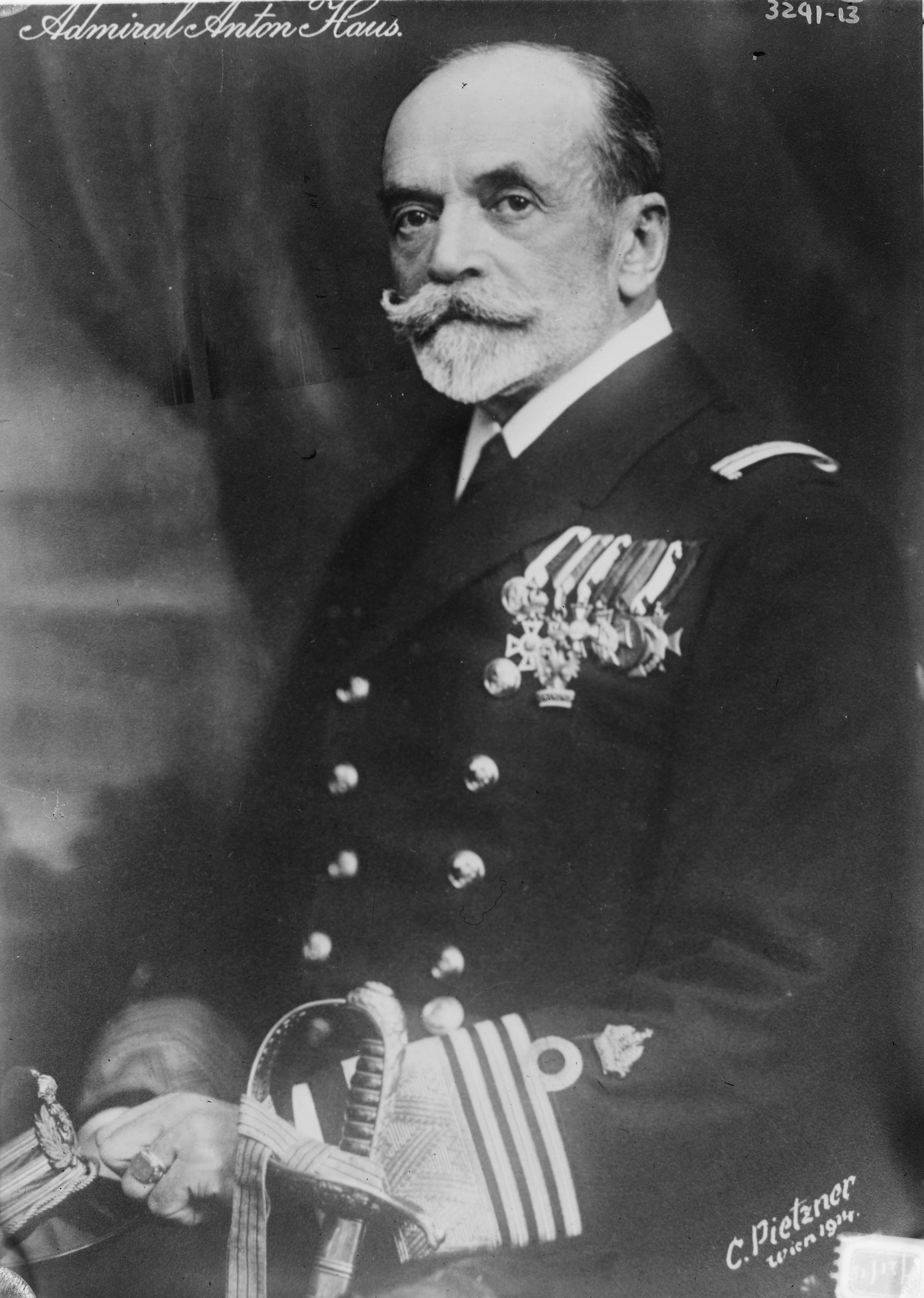
Anton Haus, Commander-in-Chief of the Austro-Hungarian Navy in 1914

Haus, not wishing to begin his tenure as Commander-in-Chief of the Navy by circumventing the Austro-Hungarian government for funding, refused to begin construction on any new class of dreadnoughts before a budget was passed by the Austrian Reichsrat and Hungarian Diet. Haus' proposal for a naval expansion met immediate opposition in Hungary. The suggestion that construction begin before the Austro-Hungarian government had an opportunity to approve any new budget led to Hungarian Prime Minister László Lukács threatening to resign. The lack of a Hungarian government to approve any budget had delayed construction on the Tegetthoff class in 1909 when Sándor Wekerle's government in Budapest collapsed. Not wishing to repeat the same sort of budget crisis which had left those ships without any formal governmental approval for a year, Haus chose not to include plans for a new class of battleships in his 1914 budget proposal to the Austrian and Hungarian parliaments. In October 1913 however, Haus did obtain support from the Austro-Hungarian Ministerial Council to construct four dreadnoughts to replace the three Monarch-class ships, as well as Habsburg, Austria-Hungary's oldest pre-dreadnought battleship. Haus' entire naval construction program was estimated cost over 420 million Kronen, and it included the construction of six destroyers, three cruisers, and four dreadnought battleships.

Securing the necessary funding for the battleships was made easier as Lukács's government had fallen in June 1913. Lukács was succeeded as prime minister by István Tisza, who had previously secured passage of the 1910 and 1911 naval budgets to authorize construction of the Tegetthoff class. Tisza had done this after being promised that the contract to construct one ship from the class would be awarded to the Ganz-Danubius shipyard in Hungarian Fiume. Since the negotiations over funding for the Tegetthoffs, Tisza had become even more committed to the cause of Austro-Hungarian naval expansion. When the Austrian and Hungarian delegations to the Ministerial Council met in Vienna at the end of 1913 to pass a budget for the first six months of 1914, proponents of the project used the occasion to rally support for the battleships. Albert von Mühlwerth, a German member of the Reichsrat from Bohemia, made the justification that expanding and modernizing the Austro-Hungarian Navy was necessary in order to replace the obsolete Monarch class; stating, "If my coat is old and threadbare, I buy myself a new one...it is the same with warships." These efforts were made even though Haus had no plans to submit any proposal to obtain funding for the proposed ships until the next year.

=== Passage of the 1915–1919 naval program ===
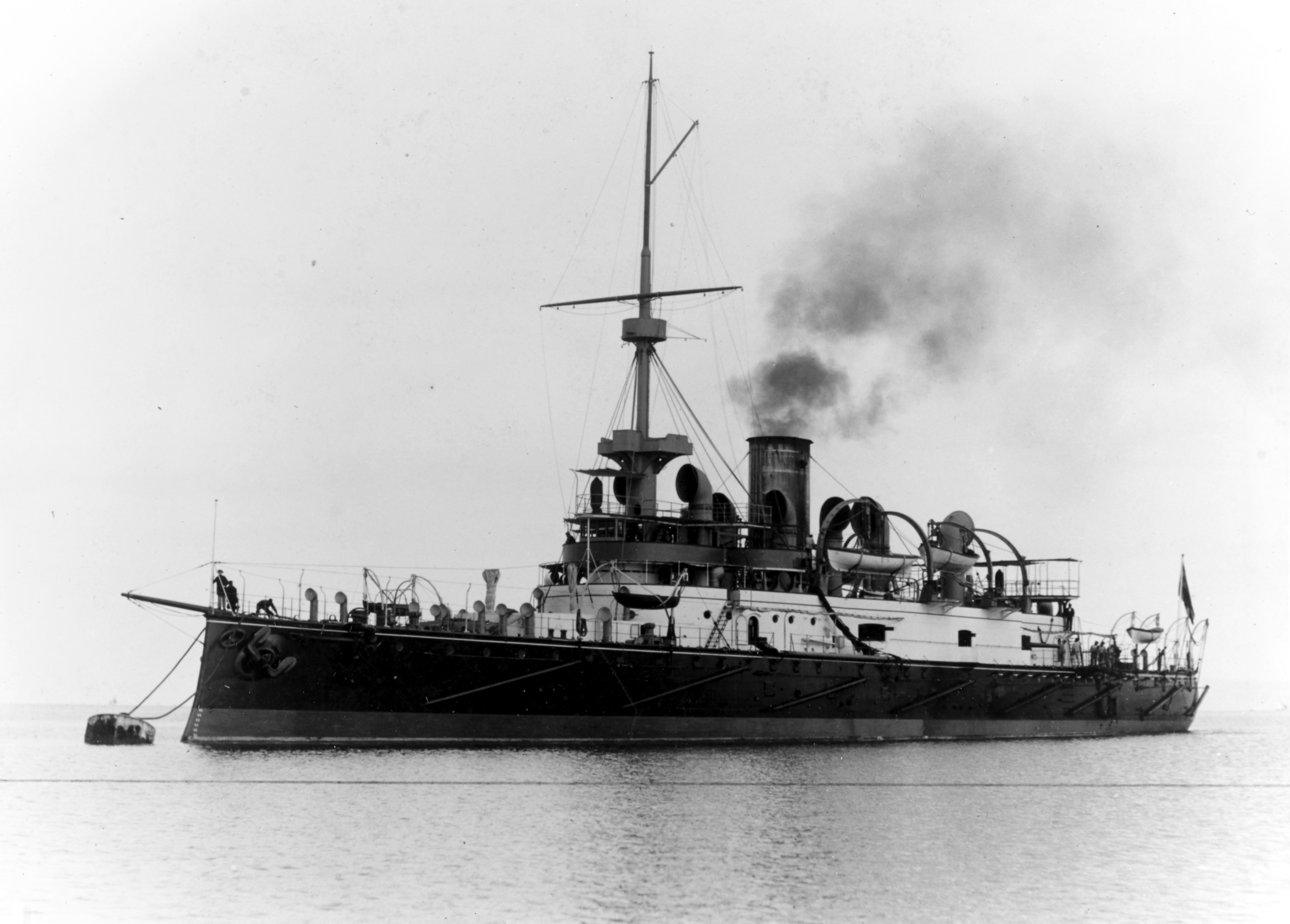
The Monarch-class coastal defense ship Wien in 1898

When the reconvened session opened in the Hungarian capital in early 1914, Haus made his formal proposal for funding the 1915–1919 naval program. His project was to cost between 426.8 and 427.8 million Kronen, (Note: There is some debate over the exact size of the budget for Haus' 1915–1919 naval program. Vego claims the budget was 427 million Kronen. Sondhaus states the budget was 426.8 million. Sieche writes that the budget was 427.8 million.) and was to be spaced out over a period of five years. The Hungarians, led by Tisza, supported the proposal after Haus had promised that six destroyers, two river monitors, and two of the four dreadnoughts in the expansion program would be constructed in Fiume, much like the battleship Szent István. As with past budgets approving large increases in naval funds, Austria's Social Democratic Party opposed the budget. Karl Leuthner, a Social Democrat from Lower Austria and editor of the party's newspaper Arbeiter-Zeitung, criticized the budget as fiscally irresponsible and stated that the ships of the Ersatz Monarch class would be launched "into the ocean of the Austrian state debt." The Social Democrats were joined in opposition by the Young Czech Party, which had been supportive of constructing the previous Tegetthoff-class battleships. Karel Kramář, leader of the party, stated that while he had "a certain partiality for the navy", his party was opposed to many of the pro-German arguments being presented to justify the ships. Many German nationalists from Austria had voiced their support for the battleships' construction on the grounds that their existence made Austria-Hungary's alliance with Germany more powerful. Heinrich von Lützow, a member of the Austrian House of Lords and former Austro-Hungarian Ambassador to Italy, went so far as to argue that "every supporter of the Triple Alliance...must vote for the strengthening of our navy." Unlike previous battleships, the Ersatz Monarch class were ordered at a time when relations between Austria-Hungary and Italy appeared to be improving. Austria-Hungary and Italy had both signed a renewed naval agreement in the summer of 1913 to coordinate their efforts in the event of a hypothetical war between the Triple Alliance and the Triple Entente. Thus when the time came for the Austro-Hungarian government to debate the funding and approval for a new class of battleships, the role Italy played in these discussions was not one of being a potential enemy, but rather it was expected that Italy would remain an ally of Austria-Hungary in any naval operations in the Mediterranean Sea against France and Russia, and that a new class of battleships was necessary to help maintain Austria-Hungary's relationship with its Italian allies. Russia now took the place of Austria-Hungary's main naval opponent in the event of a war, and the Ersatz Monarch class were thus intended to counter any potential Russian fleets operating south of the Dardanelles.

The front page of the Neue Freie Presse on 29 May 1914, which covered the passage of the naval budget funding the Ersatz Monarch-class battleships

The Budapest session overwhelmingly supported Haus' naval expansion program, the objections of the Social Democrats and Young Czechs notwithstanding. Indeed, it took the Hungarian delegation less than half an hour of debate before passing the program. (Note: The exact time it took for the Hungarian delegation to pass the budget is disputed. Vego states it took half an hour of debate, while Sondhaus states that the budget was passed in 15 minutes.) With the passage of the budget, discussions then shifted to the allocation of the funds contained within it, the Hungarians being focused on ensuring that many industrial components for the battleships would be purchased within Hungary. Despite opposing the project, the Young Czech Party worked to ensure that as large a sum as possible out of the appropriated funds would be spent in Bohemia and Moravia. Concluding that his party was "happy when Škoda has business", Kramář attempted to obtain even more funds for Bohemia and Moravia's smaller firms outside of the Witkowitz Ironworks and the Škoda Works. His party's efforts failed as the bulk of both the Austrian and Hungarian delegations refused to spend more naval money in a region of the Empire which would already be slated to construct much of the armor and weaponry of the battleships. The Social Democrats also worked to influence how the funds would be allocated after it became clear the appropriations would pass. Leuthner petitioned Haus that the Austro-Hungarian Navy should use a portion of its new funds to improve the working conditions of the thousands of workers across the Austria-Hungary who worked in the Empire's shipbuilding and armaments industries.

=== Public reaction ===
The Austrian Naval League's annual meeting had taken place at the same time that the Budapest session passed Haus' program, and news of the passage of a budget which included funds for a new series of dreadnought battleships was met with enthusiasm among the membership of the league. The reaction among the general public of Austria-Hungary to the news of a new class of battleships being approved was largely positive as well. With the budget passing both the Austrian and Hungarian delegations in quick succession, the Vienna-based newspaper Neue Freie Presse favorably covered the story of the budget negotiations and the ships they authorized, commenting that the funds had been approved with "little resistance". Indeed, the paper used many of the same arguments for the battleships which had been used by the delegation members themselves, stating that the construction of a new class of dreadnoughts to accompany the Tegetthoffs would ensure Austro-Hungarian dominance of the Adriatic Sea, which the paper described as "one of the main arteries through which the monarchy draws its blood."

== Design ==
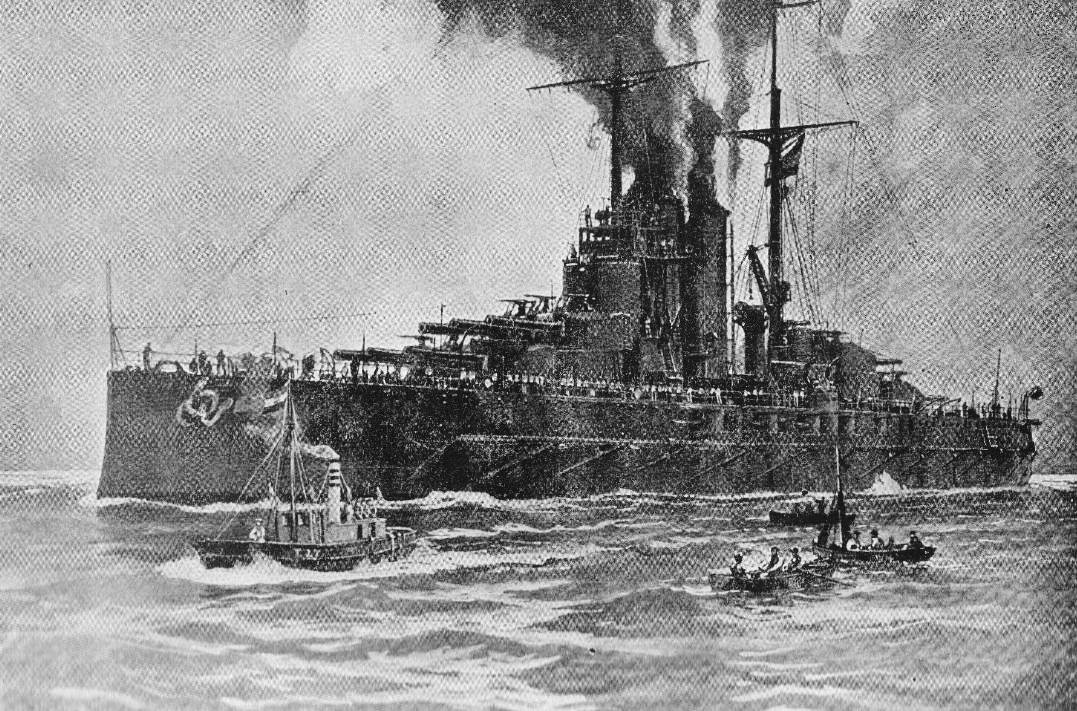
The Tegetthoff-class battleship Viribus Unitis. The Ersatz Monarch-class battleships would have been essentially an enlarged version of their predecessors

Designed by Pitzinger, the Ersatz Monarch class would have been the largest battleships built by the Austro-Hungarian Navy. Because several design sketches were put forth that all had slight differences, the exact final appearance of the Ersatz Monarch class is not known. However, the ships would have essentially been enlarged and improved versions of the Tegetthoff-class battleships. The superstructure of each ship was to be kept to a minimum, and all ships of the class would have been built with raised forecastles rather than a flush deck like their predecessors, the Tegetthoff class. This design was inspired by British warship designs of the era, and was implemented in order to give the ships greater seaworthiness outside of the Adriatic Sea. Had they been built, the Ersatz Monarch class would have become the first of any ships in the Austro-Hungarian Empire to be constructed for operation on the open ocean. The battleships would have also been equipped with lattice masts that would hold searchlight platforms.

The displacement for the Ersatz Monarch class was to be 24,500 metric tons (24,100 long tons) per ship. The overall length of each ship should would have been 172 to 175.2 meters (564 ft 4 in to 574 ft 10 in), with a beam of 28.5 meters (93 ft 6 in), and a draft of 8.4 meters (27 ft 7 in). Each battleship was to be manned by a crew of 1,050 to 1,100 officers and men.

=== Propulsion ===
The Ersatz Monarch-class ships were intended to be equipped with four steam turbines, each driving one propeller shaft, using steam provided by 15 Yarrow water-tube boilers, of which nine would be coal-fired and six would be oil-fired. These oil-burning boilers would have been a first for the Austro-Hungarian Navy, as previous battleships had relied entirely upon coal. The turbines were designed to produce 31,000 shaft horsepower (23,000 kW) to give the ships a top speed of 21 knots (39 km/h; 24 mph). Naval historian Milan Vego commented that their speed "would have been clearly inferior to their counterparts in other navies." The ships would have carried 1,425 metric tons (1,402 long tons) of coal and 1,425 metric tons (1,402 long tons) of fuel oil., enough to give them a range of 5,000 nautical miles (9,300 km; 5,800 mi) at a speed of 10 knots (19 km/h; 12 mph). Designed for operations on the open ocean, the Ersatz Monarch class were intended to have substantially greater reserve stability and a smaller angle of list in heavy seas and poor weather compared to previous Austro-Hungarian battleships.

=== Armament ===
According to the approved gun designs from January 1913, the members of the Ersatz Monarch class were initially designed to have ten 35 cm (13.8 in) guns, fourteen 15.2 cm (6 in) guns, twenty 8.9 cm (3.5 in) guns, two 4.7 cm (1.9 in) guns and six 53.3 cm (21 in) torpedo tubes. Other early plans for the battleships included ten 38-centimeter (15 in) guns, but this was ultimately scaled down in April 1914 after it was realized the displacement of each ship would have to increase to 30,000 metric tons (29,526 long tons) to accommodate the greater size and weight of the main battery. The Navy ultimately chose to equip each ship with ten 35 cm Marinekanone L/45 M. 16 main guns, to be constructed at the Škoda Works in Plzeň, Bohemia. The new guns that were approved for the final design were modified to increase the effect of a broadside. However, in order to keep a stable balance between the ships' protection, stability, and firepower, the battleships were to only be equipped with 10 guns as opposed to the 12 gun layout of the Tegetthoff-class battleships. This new layout was unusual, having a turret with three guns superimposed over a turret with two guns both fore and aft of the superstructure.

Like the Tegetthoff class before, the Ersatz Monarch class would have their secondary armament divided between two levels abreast of the funnels and bridge of each ship. Design changes throughout the planning process for the Ersatz Monarch class ships resulted in different proposals for the ships' secondary battery. The Ersatz Monarch class would ultimately have been equipped with a secondary armament of fourteen 50-caliber 15 cm (5.9 in) Škoda K10 guns, eight 45-caliber 90-millimeter (3.5 in) guns, two 47 mm Škoda SFK L/44 S guns, and a pair of 7-centimeter (2.8 in) Škoda 7 cm G. L/18 landing guns. Each ship was also designed to have five to six 53.3 cm (21 in) torpedo tubes. In February 1914, it was announced that anti-aircraft guns and "strong screens for protection against aerial attack" would be included on the Ersatz Monarch class ships. Their anti-aircraft defenses were designed to consist of eight or twelve 45-caliber 90-millimeter guns on high-angle mounts, with some of them mounted on the roofs of the main-gun turrets.

=== Armor ===
The Ersatz Monarch-class ships would have been protected at the waterline with an armored belt measuring 310 mm (12.2 in) thick amidships. This armor belt was to be located between the midpoints of the fore and aft barbettes, and would have thinned to 140 mm (5.5 in) further towards the ends of the ships. Their deck would have been 36 to 72 mm (1.4 to 2.8 in) thick. The main-gun turrets were designed to have 80 to 340 mm (3.1 to 13.4 in) of armor, while the casemates would have been shielded by armor plates 150 mm (5.9 in) thick. The conning tower of each ship was designed to be protected by 320 mm (12.6 in) armor. The underwater defenses of the battleships were a drastic change from previous Austro-Hungarian battleships, with the design being similar to contemporary French and Russian warships. The Ersatz Monarch-class ships were also designed to be built with an 85 mm (3.3 in) torpedo bulkhead.

== Ships ==
Construction data
Name	Cost	Contract awarded to	Scheduled laying down	Scheduled launching	Building time to launch	Fate
"Battleship VIII" (German: "Schlachtschiff VIII")	81,600,000 Kronen per ship, 326,400,000 Kronen in total	Stabilimento Tecnico Triestino, Trieste	1 July 1914	30 June 1917	36 months	Construction suspended until after the war, canceled, 1917
"Battleship IX" ("Schlachtschiff IX")	81,600,000 Kronen per ship, 326,400,000 Kronen in total	Stabilimento Tecnico Triestino, Trieste	1 January 1915	31 December 1917	36 months	Construction suspended until after the war, canceled, 1917
"Battleship X" ("Schlachtschiff X")	81,600,000 Kronen per ship, 326,400,000 Kronen in total	Ganz-Danubius, Fiume	1 June 1916	31 May 1919	36 months	Construction suspended until after the war, canceled, 1917
"Battleship XI" ("Schlachtschiff XI")	81,600,000 Kronen per ship, 326,400,000 Kronen in total	Ganz-Danubius, Fiume	1 June 1916	31 May 1919	36 months	Construction suspended until after the war, canceled, 1917

== Construction and cancellation ==
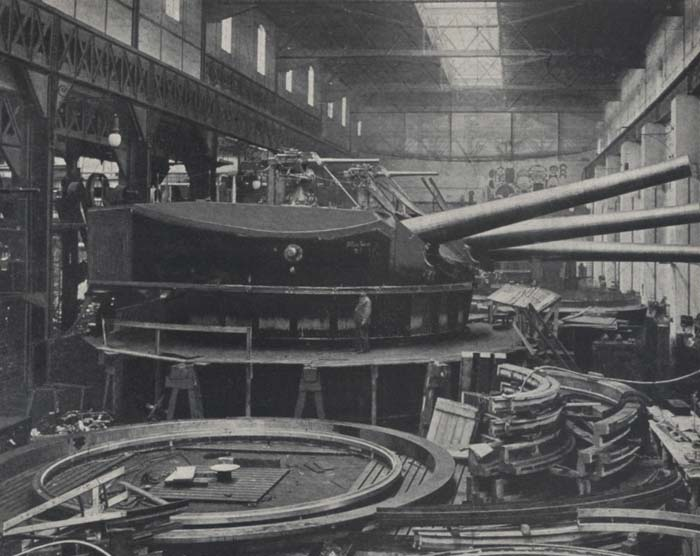
The assembly of the first gun turret for Viribus Unitis at the Škoda Works in Plzeň. The assembled guns for the Ersatz Monarch class were only slightly larger

On 28 April 1914, the Austro-Hungarian government approved Haus' 1915–1919 naval expansion program. The provisions would come into force on 1 July that same year. Shortly afterwards, the navy placed orders for four ships. The Austro-Hungarian Navy followed the traditional German custom of not naming the new ships until they were formally launched. As a result, the Navy only referred to them as "replacements" for the old Monarch-class ships.

The costs to construct the Ersatz Monarch-class battleships would have been enormous by the standards of the Austro-Hungarian Navy. While the older Habsburg, Erzherzog Karl, Radetzky, and the Tegetthoff classes cost the navy roughly 18, 26, 40, and 60 million Kronen, respectively, per ship, each ship of the Ersatz Monarch class was projected to cost over 81.6–83 million Kronen.

The four ships themselves were simply referred to as "Battleships VIII–XI" ("Schlachtschiff VIII–XI"). Construction on "Battleship VIII" was ready to begin by the start of July, and Stabilimento Tecnico Triestino had acquired the raw materials and equipment necessary to lay down the battleship, but the assassination of Archduke Franz Ferdinand in Sarajevo by Serbian agents on 28 June led to a delay in the ship's keel being laid down. After the July Crisis and Austria-Hungary's subsequent declaration of war on Serbia a month later that started World War I, construction for the battleship was pushed back to September, when the war with Serbia was expected to be over.

In August, with Austria-Hungary embroiled in a world war with Serbia, Russia, Montenegro, Belgium, France, and the United Kingdom, the Austro-Hungarian government suspended all contracts which had been awarded as part of Haus' naval program, including the four ships of the Ersatz Monarch class. By October, the Hungarian finance ministry had attempted to cancel the projects outright. While the navy was unwilling to begin work on the ships until after the war, Haus objected to a cancellation of the project and in February 1915 a compromise was reached where construction would be halted until after the war, but the project would be suspended, not formally canceled.

The main guns were built by the Škoda Works and the guns for "Battleship VIII" had been ordered prior to the beginning of the war. These were the only orders that the Austro-Hungarian Navy had placed for any part of the four battleships which were ultimately fulfilled. It was assumed that following a victorious conclusion to the war, which Austria-Hungary expected to be short, work on the battleships would resume. As the war continued, four of the guns were handed over to the Austro-Hungarian Army in 1916. The rest of the completed guns were later taken by the French as war prizes following the end of the war. In late 1917, with the war entering its third year, the construction on all four vessels was finally canceled.

== Notes ==
=== References ===
- Fitzsimons, Bernard (1978). The Illustrated Encyclopedia of 20th Century Weapons and Warfare. Vol. 8. New York, NY: Columbia House. ISBN 978-0906704004.
- Fitzsimons, Bernard (1978). The Illustrated Encyclopedia of 20th Century Weapons and Warfare. Vol. 18. New York, NY: Columbia House. ISBN 978-0906704004.
- Gardiner, Robert, ed. (1985). Conway's All the World's Fighting Ships 1906–1921. Annapolis, Maryland: Naval Institute Press. ISBN 978-0-87021-907-8. OCLC 12119866.
- Gebhard, Louis (1968). "Austria-Hungary's Dreadnought Squadron: The Naval Outlay of 1911". Austrian History Yearbook. 4: 245–258. doi:10.1017/S0067237800013230. S2CID 145130091.
- Gill, C.C. (January–February 1914). "Professional Notes". United States Naval Institute Proceedings. 40 (1).
- Greger, René (1976). Austro-Hungarian Warships of World War I. London: Ian Allan. ISBN 0-7110-0623-7.
- Sieche, Erwin F. (1992). "Answer to Question 52/90". Warship International. XXIX (4): 411–421. ISSN 0043-0374.
- Sieche, Erwin F. (1981). "Grosskampfschiffs-Projekte des MTK aus der Zeit des Ersten Weltkrieg". Marine - Gestern, Heute: Nachrichten aus dem Marinewesen (4): 123ff. OCLC 648103394.
- Sieche, Erwin F. (1991). "S.M.S. Szent István: Hungaria's Only and Ill-Fated Dreadnought". Warship International. XXVII (2): 112–146. ISSN 0043-0374.
- Sokol, Anthony (1968). The Imperial and Royal Austro-Hungarian Navy. Annapolis, Maryland: United States Naval Institute. OCLC 462208412.
- Sondhaus, Lawrence (1994). The Naval Policy of Austria-Hungary, 1867-1918: Navalism, Industrial Development, and the Politics of Dualism. West Lafayette, Indiana: Purdue University Press. ISBN 978-1-55753-034-9.
- Sturton, Ian (1987). Conway's All the World's Battleships: 1906–Present. Annapolis, Maryland: Naval Institute Press. ISBN 978-0-87021-907-8.
- Vego, Milan (1996). Austro-Hungarian Naval Policy, 1904–1914. London: Routledge. ISBN 978-0-7146-4209-3.
