= Franz Pitzinger =

- Born: 22 May 1858; Enzersdorf an der Fischa
- Died: 10 October 1933 (aged 75); Hofstetten-Grünau
- Education: Vienna University of Technology
- Engineering career
- Projects: Ersatz Monarch-class battleship
- Awards: Order of Franz Joseph

Franz Pitzinger (22 May 1858, Enzersdorf an der Fischa – 10 October 1933, Hofstetten-Grünau) was a naval architect in late-nineteenth- and early twentieth-century Austria-Hungary.

== Naval career ==
He studied mechanical engineering at the Vienna University of Technology and started his career at Clayton & Shuttleworth. Pitzinger joined the Austro-Hungarian Navy in 1886. He spent much of his career at the naval arsenal in Pula. He had significant design responsibilities for the Erzherzog Karl-class battleships and the Radetzky-class battleships. He led the design of the Ersatz Monarch-class battleships which were cancelled when World War I broke out in 1914. In 1914 he was promoted to Naval Constructor General. His naval career ended in 1918 with the collapse of the Austro-Hungarian empire.
