= 35 cm Marinekanone L/45 M. 16 =

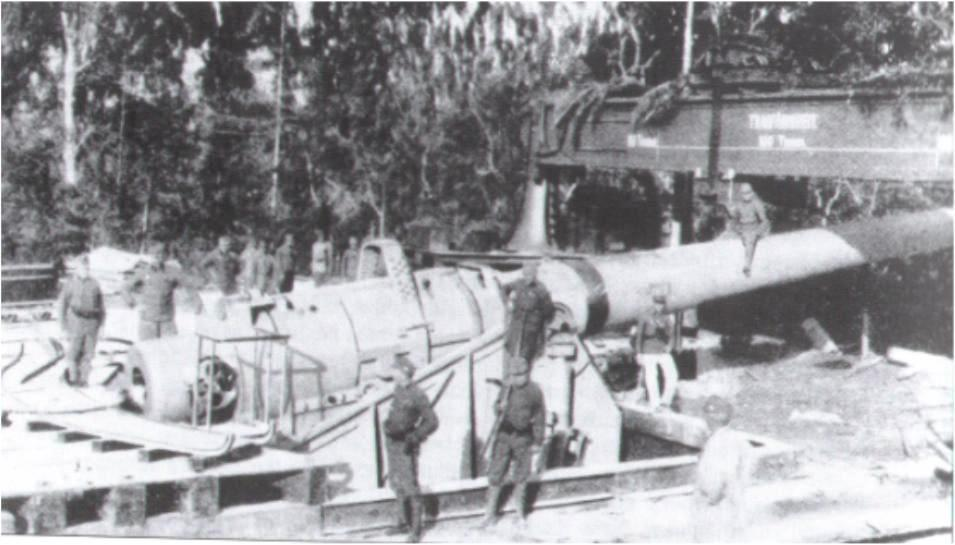
- The 35 cm Marinekanone M. 16 with its assembly crane
- Type: Battleship gun
- Place of origin: Austria-Hungary

Service history
- In service: 1916–1918
- Used by: Austria-Hungary
- Wars: World War I

Production history
- Designer: Škoda
- Designed: 1914–16
- Manufacturer: Škoda
- Produced: 1914–18
- No. built: 4

Specifications
- Barrel length: L/45
- Shell: 700 kilograms (1,500 lb)
- Caliber: 350 mm
- Breech: interrupted screw?
- Traverse: 0°
- Muzzle velocity: 770 m/s
- Maximum firing range: 31,000 metres (34,000 yd)

The 35 cm Marinekanone L/45 M. 16 (45 caliber Naval gun Model 16) was used by Austria-Hungary during World War I as a superheavy siege gun. Eleven of these had been ordered from Škoda Works before the war to equip the first unit of the Ersatz Monarch-class battleships that Austria had ordered. The ships were cancelled shortly after the outbreak of the war, but the guns continued in production.

== History ==
The first gun and its cradle was reported ready for delivery by Skoda on 28 May 1915, but it was not tested until April 1916. Shortly afterwards it was sent to the Italian Front and installed in the train yard of Calceranica al Lago near the shore of Caldonazzo lake, where it fired 122 shots before it was returned to Skoda on 30 May 1916 for refurbishing. It was nicknamed "Lange Georg" by the troops and the first task assigned was to support the Strafexpedition targeting at the Italian command center in Asiago 34 km away, where Italians believed to be out of range by artillery attacks. The operative position near the town center forced the personnel to activate a siren before shooting in order to open all the surrounding windows to prevent damages by the shock waves.

Either "Georg" or Gun No. 2 was sent to the Romanian Front to assist in the crossing of the Danube in November 1916, but only a few shots were fired before it was withdrawn. Skoda reported in May 1917 that Gun No. 1 had returned from the front, Gun No. 2 had been delivered, Gun No. 3 was complete (it was tested on 18 May 1917), Gun No. 4 was in the final stages of completion while Guns No. 5-11 were in different stages of completion. Gun No. 2 was sent to the Italian Front at the end of August 1917 at Santa Croce, north of Trieste. It was ready to fire on 23 September 1917 against the Italian coastal batteries between Grado and the Isonzo estuary. It fired the first shot over the Gulf of Trieste on 18 October 1917.

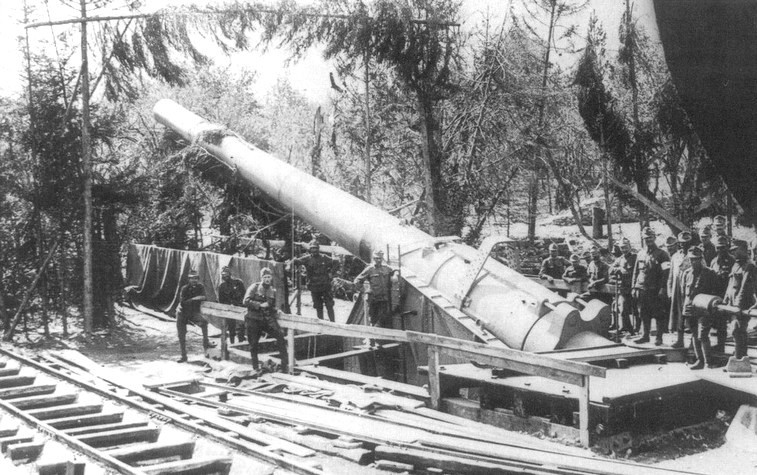
Italian front, 1917

The fate of the guns is unclear. The Italians captured one as did the French (probably No. 4, which had been delivered shortly before the end of the war) and the Serbs. The former two scrapped theirs, but the Serbs had one during the interwar period.

A proper mount for the gun couldn't be devised in a timely manner and its carriage was mounted on a steel platform lined with wood. It had to be traversed with winches. A 100-ton crane was required for assembly. Postwar plans were to mount them on rail carriages, but these came to naught with the breakup of Austria-Hungary.
