= Škoda 15 cm K10 gun =

Škoda 15 cm K10
- Type: Naval gun Coastal artillery
- Place of origin: Austria-Hungary

Service history
- In service: 1910–1945
- Used by: Austria-Hungary; Italy
- Wars: World War I World War II

Production history
- Designer: Škoda
- Designed: 1910
- Manufacturer: Škoda
- Produced: 1912
- No. built: ~48

Specifications
- Length: 7.5 m (24 ft 7 in)
- Shell weight: 45.5 kg (100 lb)
- Caliber: 149.1 mm (5.87 in) 50 caliber
- Breech: Horizontal sliding-block
- Elevation: -6° to + 15°
- Traverse: -60 to +60°
- Rate of fire: 6 rpm
- Muzzle velocity: 880 m/s (2,900 ft/s)
- Maximum firing range: 15 km (9.3 mi) at +15°

The Škoda 15 cm K10 was a naval gun of the Austro-Hungarian Empire that was used by the Austro-Hungarian Navy during World War I. The gun was actually 149.1 mm, but the classification system for artillery rounded up to the next highest centimeter. The 15 cm K10 was called cannon 149/47 (Note: In Italian nomenclature the first number indicates the caliber expressed in millimeters, the second the length in calibers. This second value is not 50 calibers because the Italians calculated the length of the barrel excluding the firing chamber.) by the Italians and was used by the Italian Navy as coastal artillery during World War II.

== Construction ==
The Škoda 15 cm K10 was developed and built by Škoda Works in Plzeň. The barrel was made of steel with a horizontal sliding breech block and the gun used separate loading ammunition with a cartridge case and bagged charge.

== History ==
They were used as secondary armament on the four battleships of the Tegetthoff-class. Each ship had six guns per side mounted on pedestal mounts in casemates amidships. After World War I SMS Tegetthoff was delivered to Italy as a war reparation. Tegetthoff was decommissioned and remained in Venice until 1923 when it was moved to La Spezia to be scrapped in 1925 . The guns recovered from Tegetthof were assigned to coastal batteries in Libya and Croatia where they were used in World War II. The barrel, pedestal and semi-circular armored shield from the casemates were reused, but the mounts were modified to increase elevation to +35 ° and traverse to 360°. The only remaining complete 15 cm/50 gun of the four-gun battery Batterie Madonna is located on the island of Veli Brioni near Pula, Croatia. The engravings on this gun have been obscured by rust, but it appears that this gun is serial number 15 and was manufactured in 1912.

== Ammunition ==
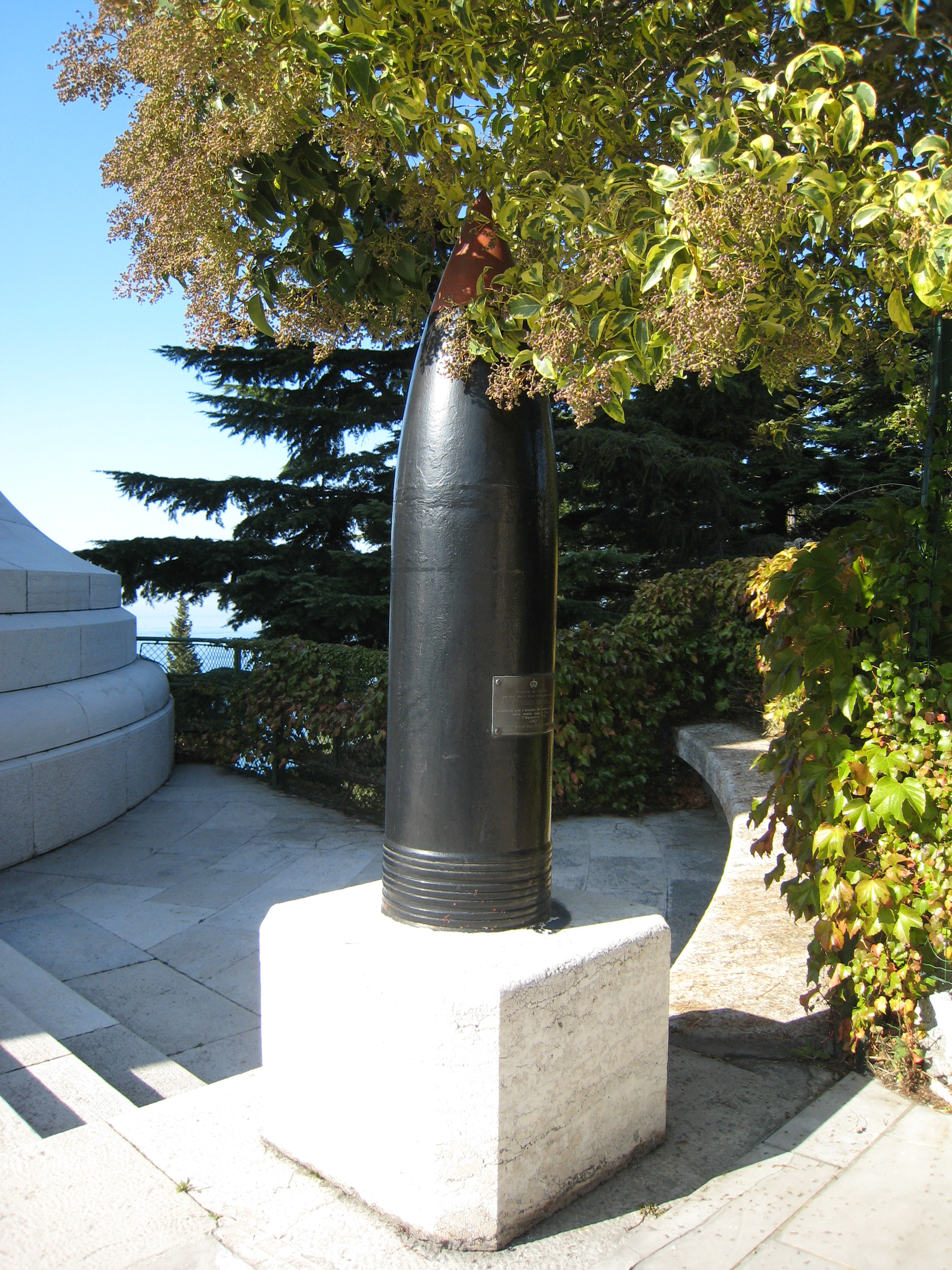
Shell from the Viribus Unitis at Victory Lighthouse

Ammunition was of separate loading type with a cartridge case and a bagged charge which weighed 37 kilograms (82 lb).

The gun was able to fire:

- Armor Piercing - 45.5 kg (100 lb)
- High Explosive-45.5 kg (100 lb)
