= Enzersdorf an der Fischa =

- Municipality
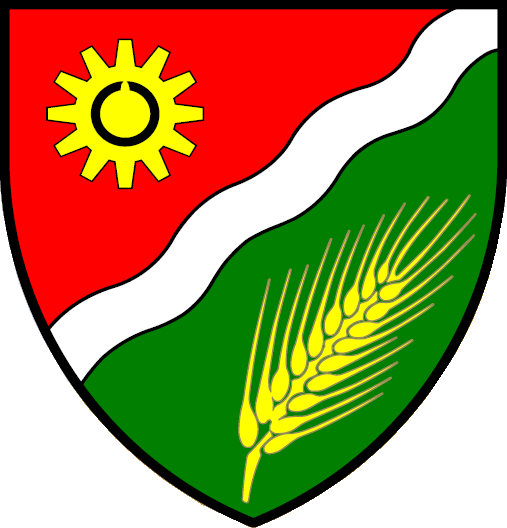
- Coat of arms

- Location within Austria
- Coordinates: 48°5′N 16°36′E
- Country: Austria
- State: Lower Austria
- District: Bruck an der Leitha

Government
  - Mayor: Markus Plöchl

Area
  - Total: 31.43 km^{2} (12.14 sq mi)
- Elevation: 160 m (520 ft)

Population (2018-01-01)
  - Total: 3,163
  - Density: 100.6/km^{2} (260.6/sq mi)
- Time zone: UTC+1 (CET)
  - Summer (DST): UTC+2 (CEST)
- Postal code: 2431
- Area code: 02230

Enzersdorf an der Fischa is a town in the district of Bruck an der Leitha in Lower Austria in Austria.

== Geography ==
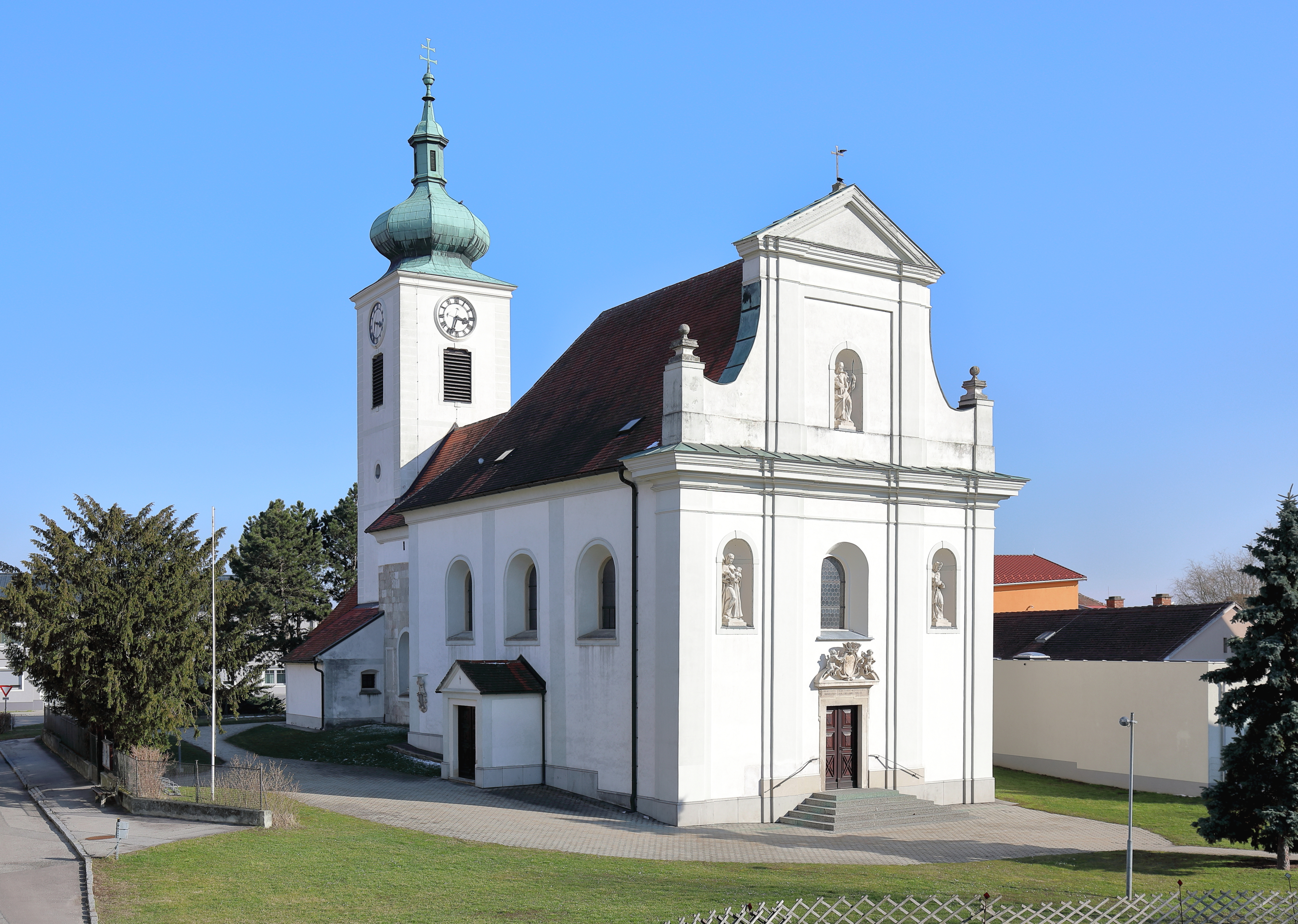
Parish church

Enzersdorf an der Fischa lies in the industrial area of Lower Austria. About 15.42 percent of the municipality is forested.
