= Vítkovice Mining and Iron Corporation =

Iron mill in Czechoslovakia

Vítkovice Mining and Iron Corporation (German: Witkowitzer Bergbau- und Hüttengewerkschaft) was an iron mill in Ostrava, Vítkovice, Czechoslovakia founded by Salomon Meyer von Rothschild's heirs in 1873, it was the largest iron and steel works in Austria-Hungary.

== History ==
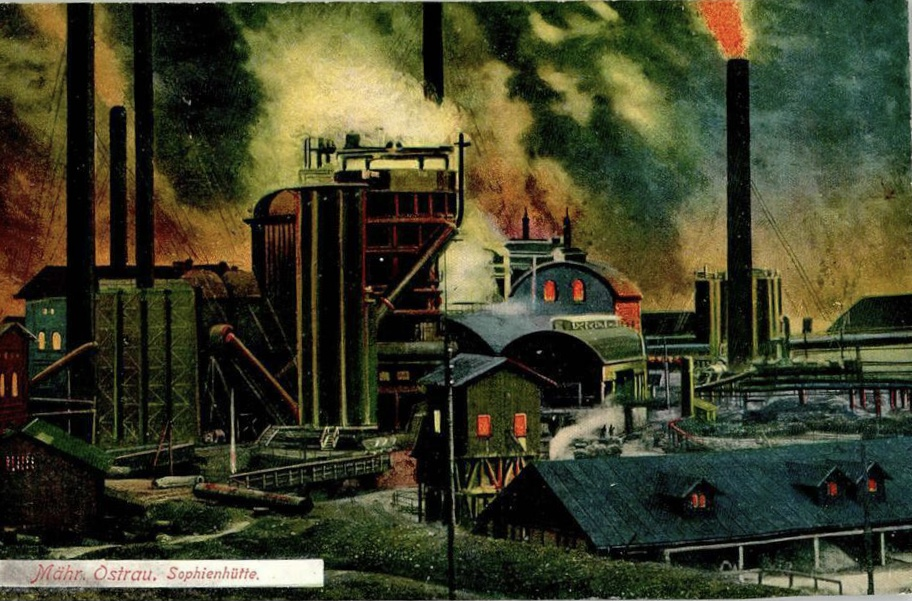
The Sophienhütte ironworks, c. 1910

The Vitkovice metallurgic plant was created in 1828 by Rudolf Habsburg (Archbishop of Olomouc). In 1835, the plant was leased to a consortium of Viennese bankers, among them Salomon Mayer Rothschild. Under the Rothschild's leadership, two coke blast furnaces were added to the operations, and ore and coal mines were acquired. The Rothschilds saw the development of the Emperor Ferdinand Northern Railway as an opportunity to develop metallurgic activities in the region.

Salomon Mayer von Rothschild finally acquired Vitkovice in 1843. In the next forty years, Vitkovice's market share grew sixfold. The Vítkovice ironworks site was the first in the country to be modernized with gas lights.

The economic crisis of 1873 sparked many layoffs and led the Rothschilds to invite the Gutmann brothers (Wilhelm and David) in the company's ownership. The company became the Vítkovická mining and metallurgical mining company, and gradually fell under the control of the Gutmann brothers. Under the direction of Paul Kupelwieser, the company built the Nové Vítkovice project, a factory town in Ostrava, and engaged in many progressive social reforms. Kupelwieser left Vitkovice in 1893.

In 1937, the company shares were transferred to a company named the Alliance Assurance Co., Ltd a forerunner of the RSA Insurance Group, and in which the London House of Rothschild still had a controlling interest.

During the Anschluss, Louis Nathaniel de Rothschild was arrested by the Gestapo during an attempted escape and was kept as a hostage for two years, until the London-based holding agreed to sell its Vitkovice shares to the German government for the discounted price of 2.9 million pounds. In May 1939 Baron Rothschild was released and the Vitkovice Works eventually became part of the Reichswerke Hermann Göring.

After World War II they were nationalized as the Vítkovické železárny Klement Gottwald n.p. (VŽKG) by the Czechoslovak state.
