= Paris Gun =

German super heavy field gun of World War I

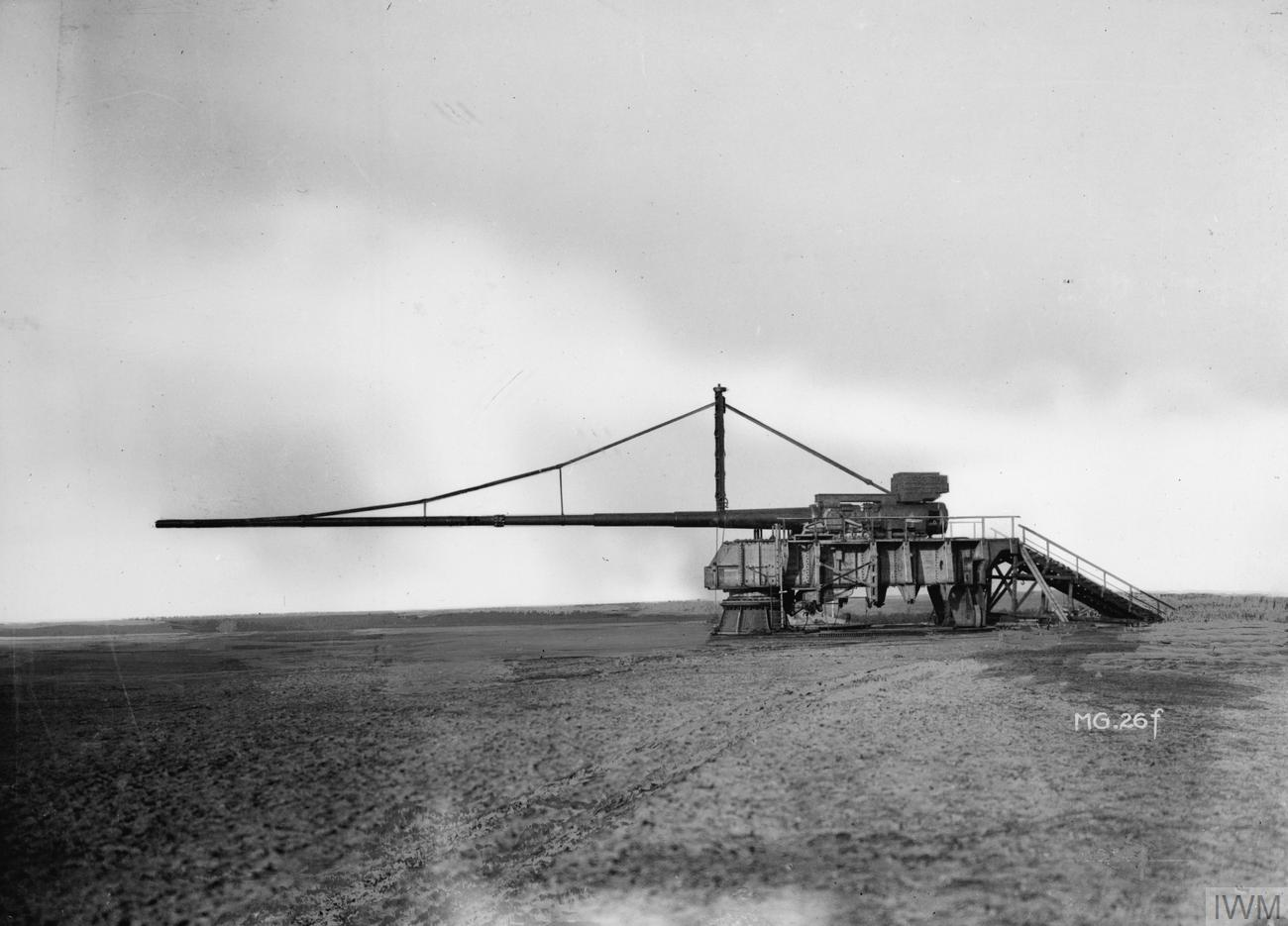
- The Paris Gun, largest of World War I, in 1918 shelled Paris from 120 km (75 mi) away.
- Type: Super heavy field gun
- Place of origin: German Empire

Service history
- Used by: German Empire
- Wars: World War I

Production history
- Designer: Dr. Fritz Rausenberger
- Manufacturer: Krupp

Specifications
- Mass: 256 t (252 long tons; 282 short tons)
- Length: 34 m (111 ft 7 in)
- Barrel length: 21 m (68 ft 11 in)
- Caliber: 211 mm (8.3 in), later rebored to 238 mm (9.4 in)
- Breech: horizontal sliding-block
- Elevation: 55 degrees
- Muzzle velocity: 1,640 m/s (5,400 ft/s)
- Maximum firing range: 130 km (81 mi)

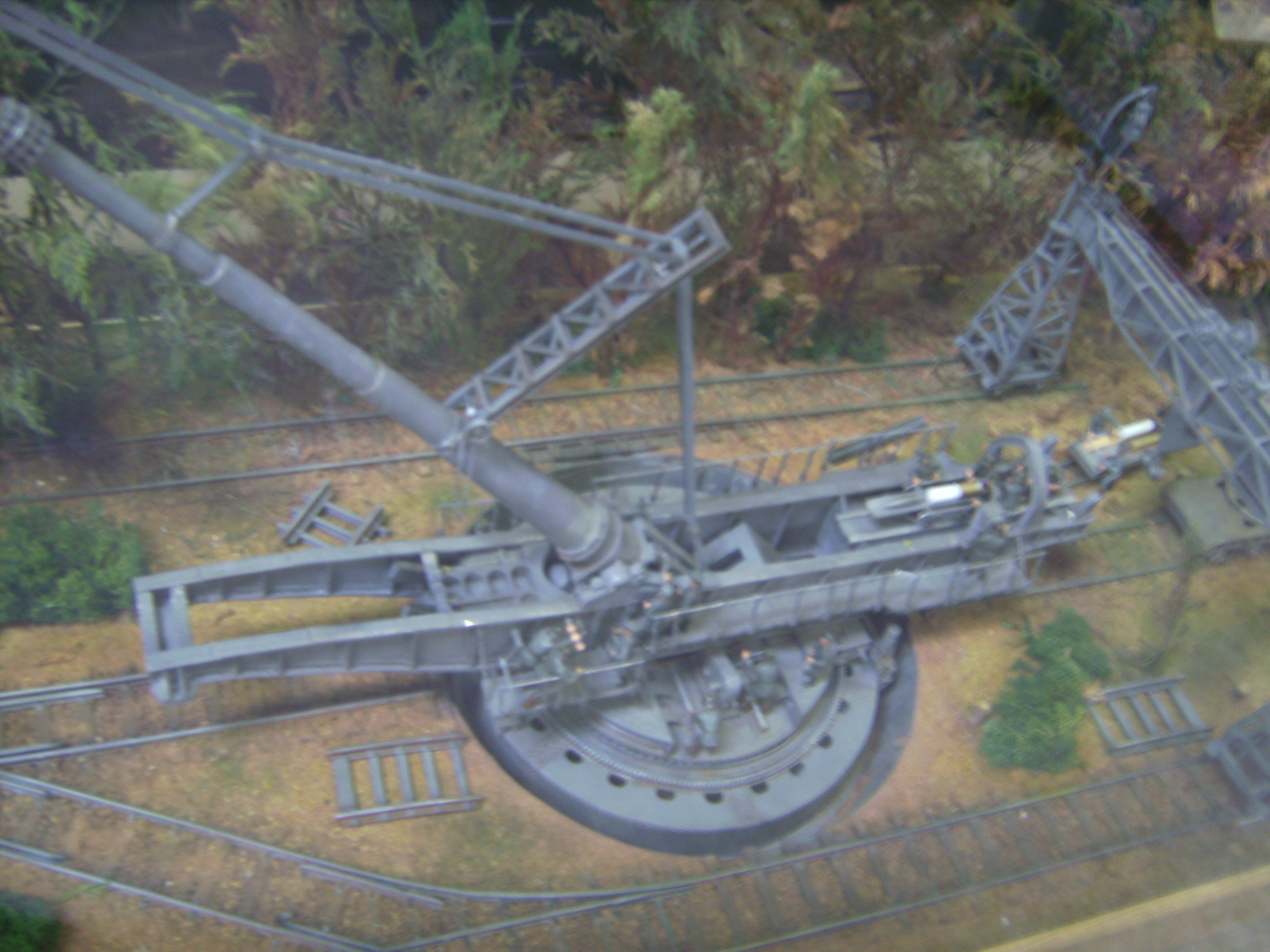
Scale model of a Paris Gun on its fixed mounting, Wehrtechnische Studiensammlung Koblenz

The Paris Gun (German: Paris-Geschütz / Pariser Kanone) was a type of German long-range siege gun, several of which were used to bombard Paris during World War I. They were in service from March to August 1918. When the guns were first employed, Parisians believed they had been bombed by a high-altitude Zeppelin, because the sound of neither an airplane nor a gun could be heard. They were the largest pieces of artillery used during the war by barrel length, and qualify under the (later) formal definition of large-calibre artillery. Also called the "Kaiser Wilhelm Geschütz" ("Kaiser Wilhelm Gun"), they were often confused with Big Bertha, the German howitzer used against Belgian forts in the Battle of Liège in 1914; indeed, the French called them by this name as well. (Note: For an instance of war-time naming of this gun as "Big Bertha", see "Paris again Shelled by Long-Range Gun" (PDF). The New York Times. August 6, 1918. p. 3.) They were also confused with the smaller "Langer Max" (Long Max) cannon, from which they were derived. Although the famous Krupp-family artillery makers produced all these guns, the resemblance ended there.

As military weapons, the Paris Guns were not a great success: the payload was small, the barrel required frequent replacement, and the guns' accuracy was good enough for only city-sized targets. The German objective was to build a psychological weapon to attack the morale of the Parisians, not to destroy the city itself.

== Description ==
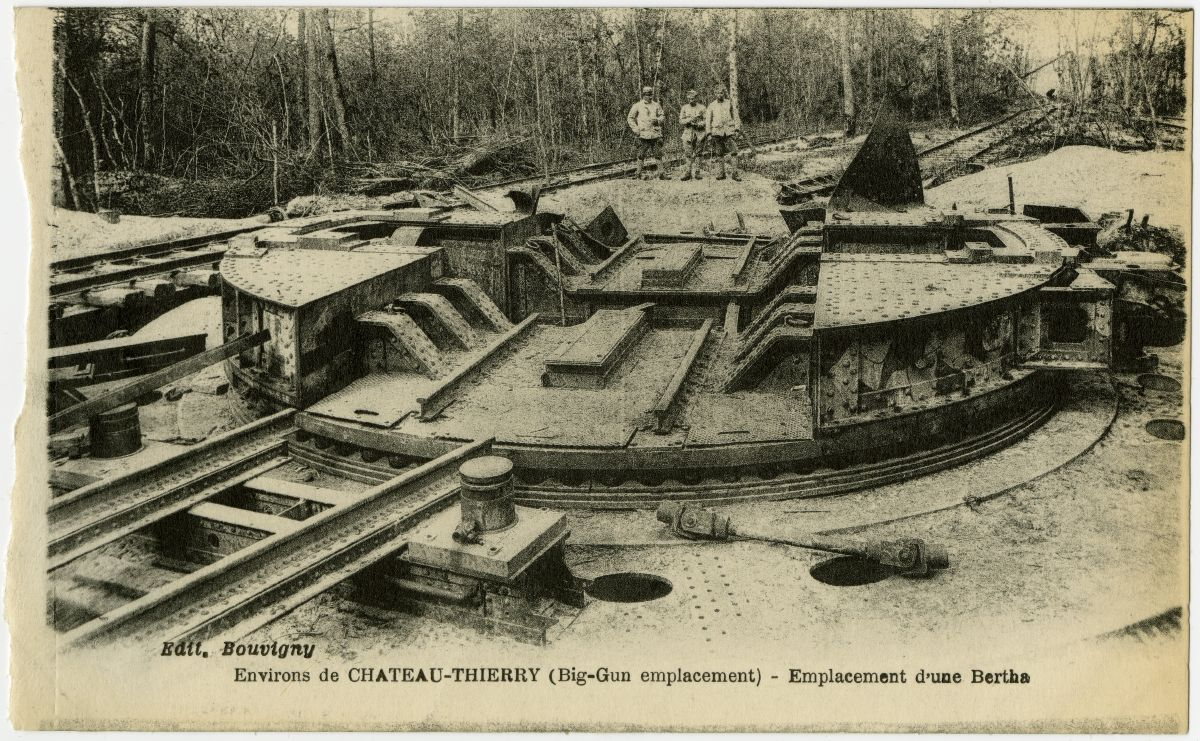
A Paris gun turntable mounting, as captured by United States forces near Château-Thierry, 1918 postcard

Due to the weapon's apparent total destruction by the Germans in the face of the final Entente offensives, its capabilities are not known with full certainty. Figures stated for the weapon's size, range, and performance varied widely depending on the source—not even the number of shells fired is certain. In the 1980s, a long note on the gun was discovered and published. (Note: See Bull and Murphy (1988)) This was written by Dr. Fritz Rausenberger (in German), the Krupp engineer in charge of the gun's development, shortly before his death in 1926. Thanks to this, the details of the gun's design and capabilities were considerably clarified.

The gun was capable of firing a 106-kilogram (234 lb) shell to a range of 130 kilometres (81 mi) and a maximum altitude of 42.3 km (26.3 mi)—the greatest height reached by a human-made projectile until the first successful V-2 flight test in October 1942. At the start of its 182-second flight, each shell from the Paris Gun reached a speed of 1,640 m/s (5,904 km/h; 5,381 ft/s; 3,669 mph).

The distance was so far that the Coriolis effect—the rotation of the Earth—was substantial enough to affect trajectory calculations. The gun was fired from a north-south axis from Crépy-en-Laon, taking into consideration that Laon is farther from the Equator than Paris. The calculations for the firing were made by a Krupp employee named as Professor von Eberhardt.

Seven barrels were constructed. They used worn-out 38 cm SK L/45 "Max" 17,130 mm (674 in) long gun barrels that were fitted with an internal tube that reduced the caliber from 380 mm (15 in) to 210 mm (8 in). The tube was 31 metres (102 ft) long and projected 13.9 m (46 ft) out of the end of the gun, so an extension was bolted to the old gun-muzzle to cover and reinforce the lining tube. A further, 6 m (20 ft) long smooth-bore extension was attached to the end of this, giving a total barrel length of 37 m (121 ft). This smooth section was intended to improve accuracy and reduce the dispersion of the shells, as it reduced the slight yaw a shell might have immediately after leaving the gun barrel produced by the gun's rifling. The barrel was braced to counteract barrel drop due to its length and weight, and vibrations while firing; it was mounted on a special rail-transportable carriage and fired from a prepared, concrete emplacement with a turntable. The original breech of the old 38 cm (15 in) gun did not require modification or reinforcement.

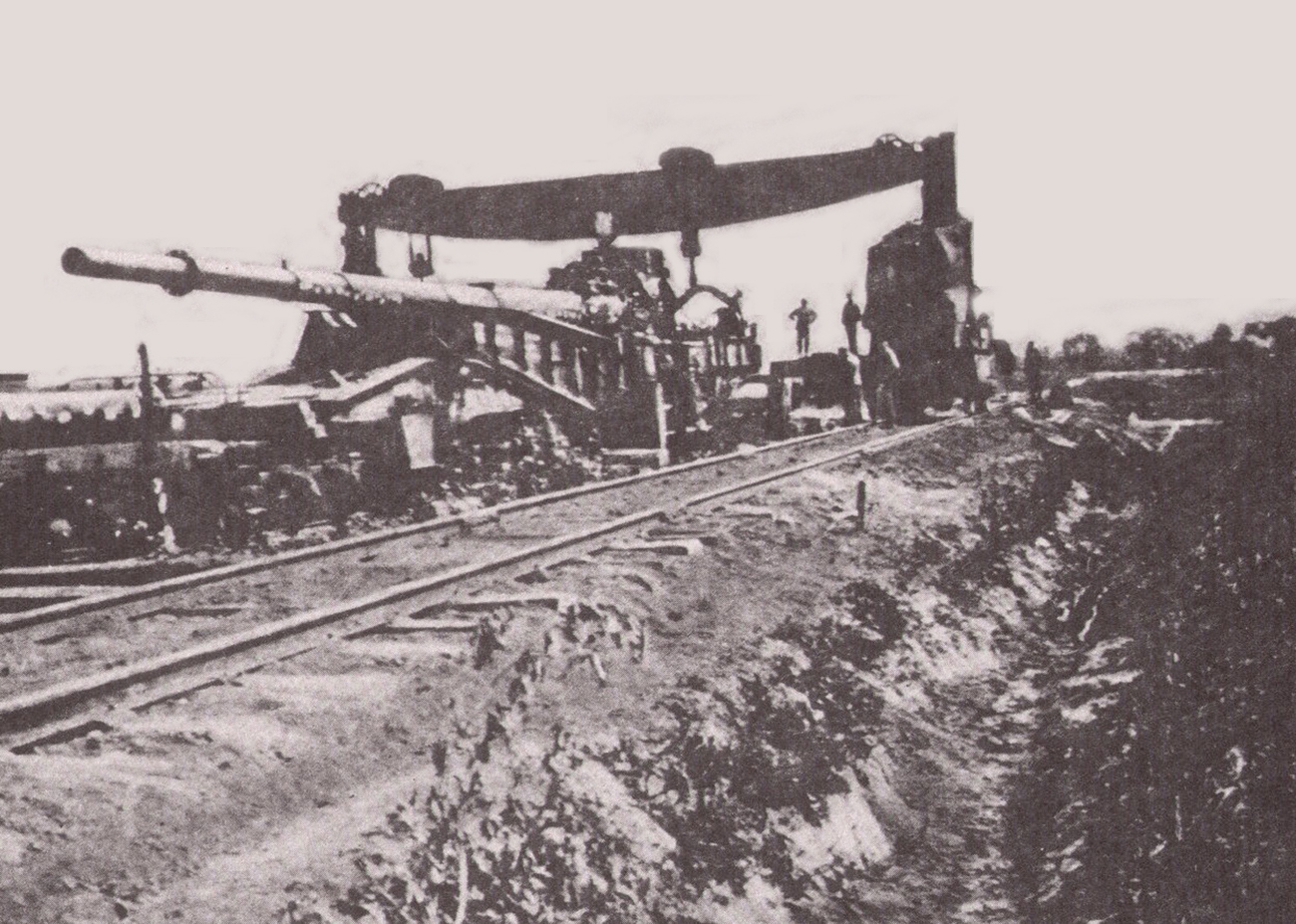
The Paris Gun prepared for rail transport.

Since it was based on a naval weapon, the gun was manned by a crew of 80 Imperial Navy sailors under the command of Vice-Admiral Maximilian Rogge, chief of the Ordnance branch of the Admiralty. It was surrounded by several batteries of standard army artillery to create a "noise-screen" chorus around the big gun so that it could not be located by French and British spotters.

The projectile flew significantly higher than projectiles from previous guns. Writer and journalist Adam Hochschild put it this way: "It took about three minutes for each giant shell to cover the distance to the city, climbing to an altitude of 40 km (25 mi) at the top of its trajectory. This was by far the highest point ever reached by a man-made object, so high that gunners, in calculating where the shells would land, had to take into account the rotation of the Earth. For the first time in warfare, deadly projectiles rained down on civilians from the stratosphere". This reduced drag from air resistance, allowing the shell to achieve a range of over 130 kilometres (81 mi).

The unfinished V-3 cannon would have been able to fire larger projectiles to a longer range, and with a substantially higher rate of fire. The unfinished Iraqi super gun would also have been substantially bigger.

== Projectiles ==
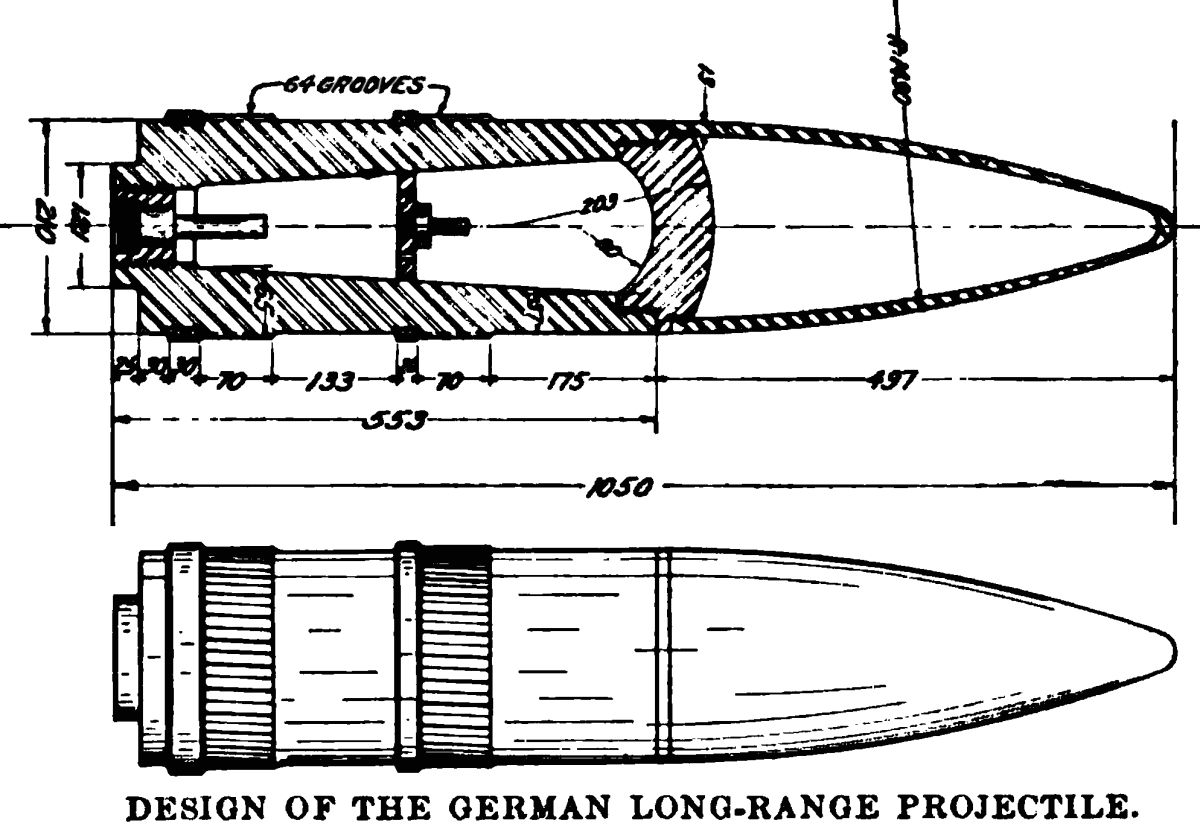
Diagram of a Paris gun shell published in 1921

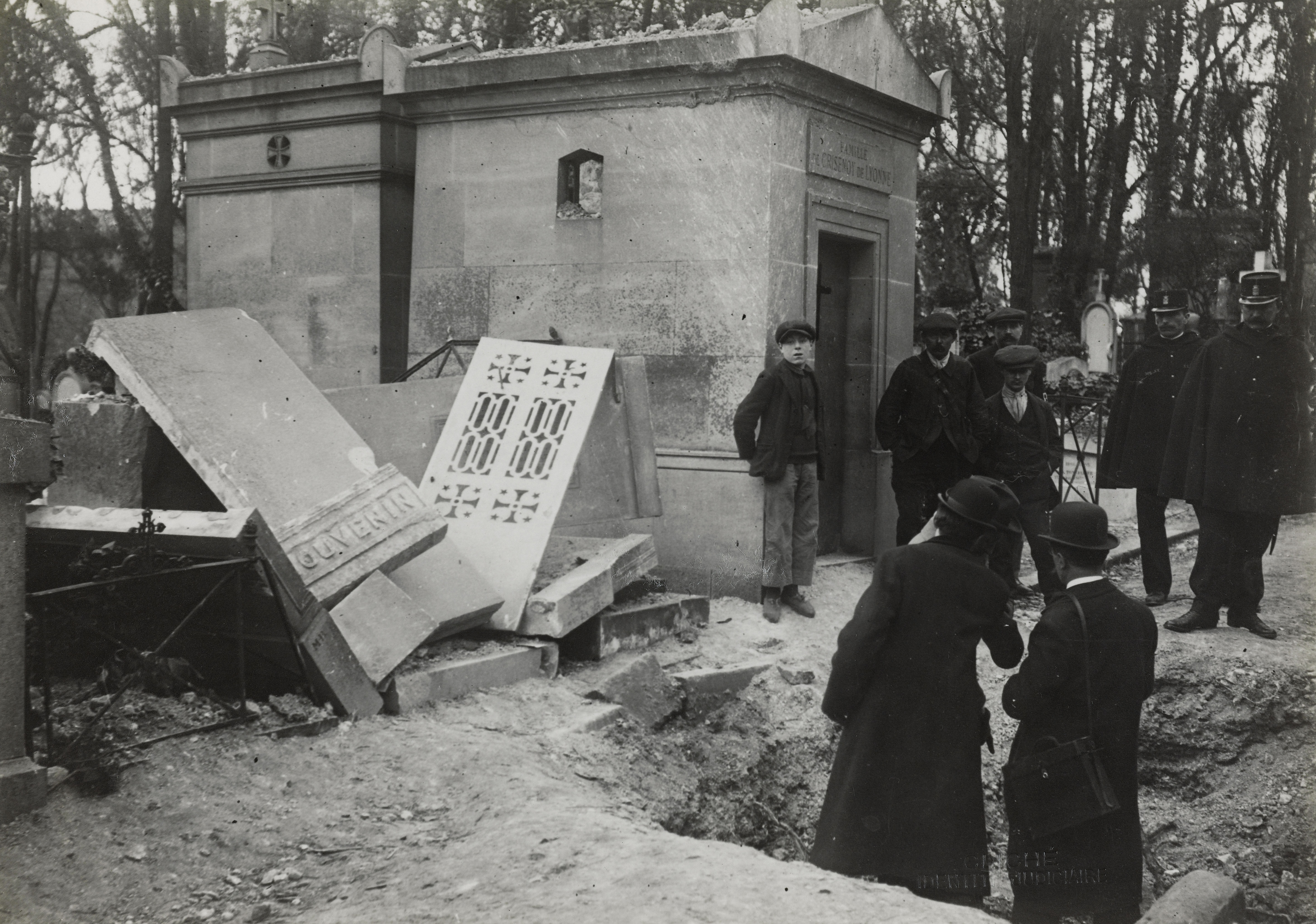
The damage caused by a shell landing on the Père Lachaise Cemetery on the 25 March 1918

The Paris Gun shells weighed 106 kg (234 lb). The shells initially used had a diameter of 216 mm (8.5 in) and a length of 960 mm (38 in). The main body of the shell comprised thick steel containing 7 kg (15 lb) of TNT. (Note: This overall weight of Paris Gun shells is not atypical for artillery of this calibre. As a comparison, World War 1-era, British BL 8-inch howitzer fired a 91 kg (201 lb) high-explosive shell. The 210 mm shell fired by the World War 2-era 21 cm Kanone 39 weighed 135 kg (298 lb) and contained 18.8 kg (41 lb) of explosives (13.9% by weight).)

The small amount of explosive—around 6.6% of the weight of the shell—meant that the effect of its shellburst was small for the shell's size. The thickness of the shell casing, to withstand the forces of firing, meant that shells would explode into a comparatively small number of large fragments, limiting their destructive effect. A crater produced by a shell falling in the Tuileries Garden was described by an eyewitness as being 3 to 4 metres (10 to 12 ft) across and 1 metre (4 ft) deep.

The shells were propelled at such a high velocity that each successive shot wore away a considerable amount of steel from the rifled bore. Each shell was sequentially numbered according to its increasing diameter, and had to be fired in numeric order, lest the projectile lodge in the bore and the gun explode. Also, when the shell was rammed into the gun, the chamber was precisely measured to determine the difference in its length: a few inches off would cause a great variance in the velocity, and with it, the range. Then, with the variance determined, the additional quantity of propellant was calculated, and its measure taken from a special car and added to the regular charge. After 65 rounds had been fired, each of progressively larger caliber to allow for wear, the barrel was sent back to Krupp and rebored with a new set of shells.

The shell's explosive was contained in two compartments, separated by a wall. This strengthened the shell and supported the explosive charge under the acceleration of firing. One of the shell's two fuzes was mounted in the wall, with the other in the base of the shell. The fuzes proved very reliable as every single one of the 303 shells that landed in and around Paris successfully detonated.

The shell's nose was fitted with a streamlined, lightweight, ballistic cap and the side had grooves that engaged with the rifling of the gun barrel, spinning the shell as it was fired so its flight was stable. Two copper driving bands provided a gas-tight seal against the gun barrel during firing.

== Use in World War I ==
Gun site near Crépy, Aisne

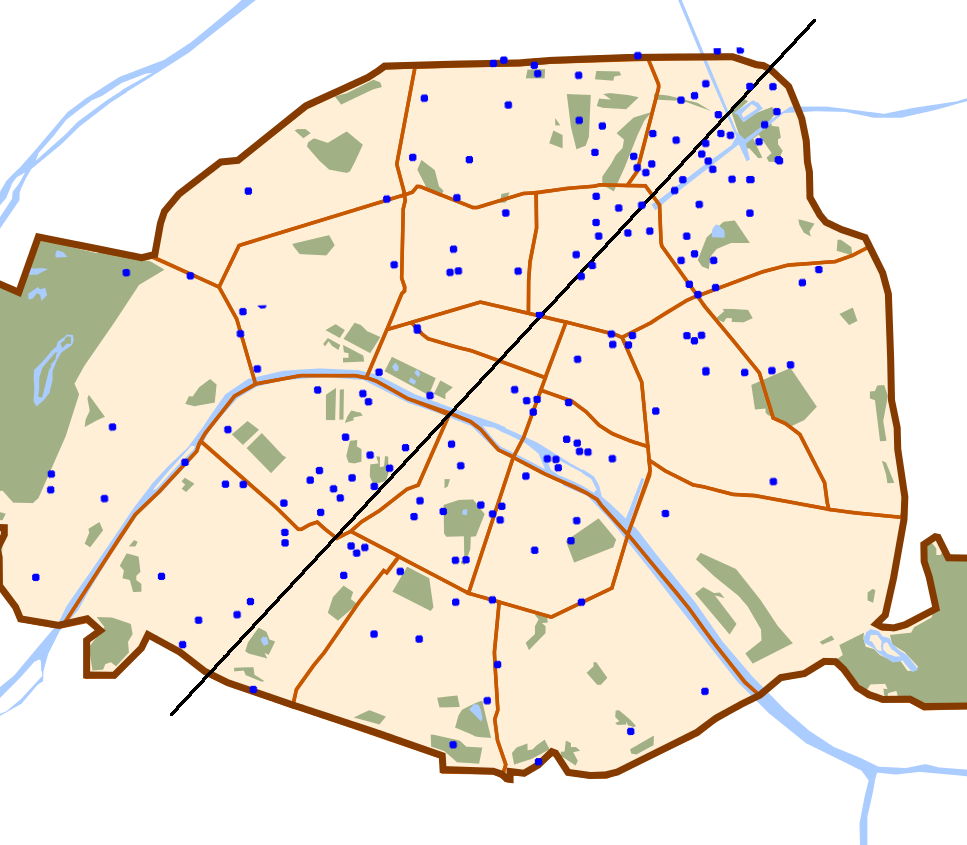
Map of central districts of Paris, showing where shells fired by the Paris Gun landed, June-August 1918, and a line indicating the direction of the German guns. (Some shells landed outside this area.) Based on Miller (1921), p. 735

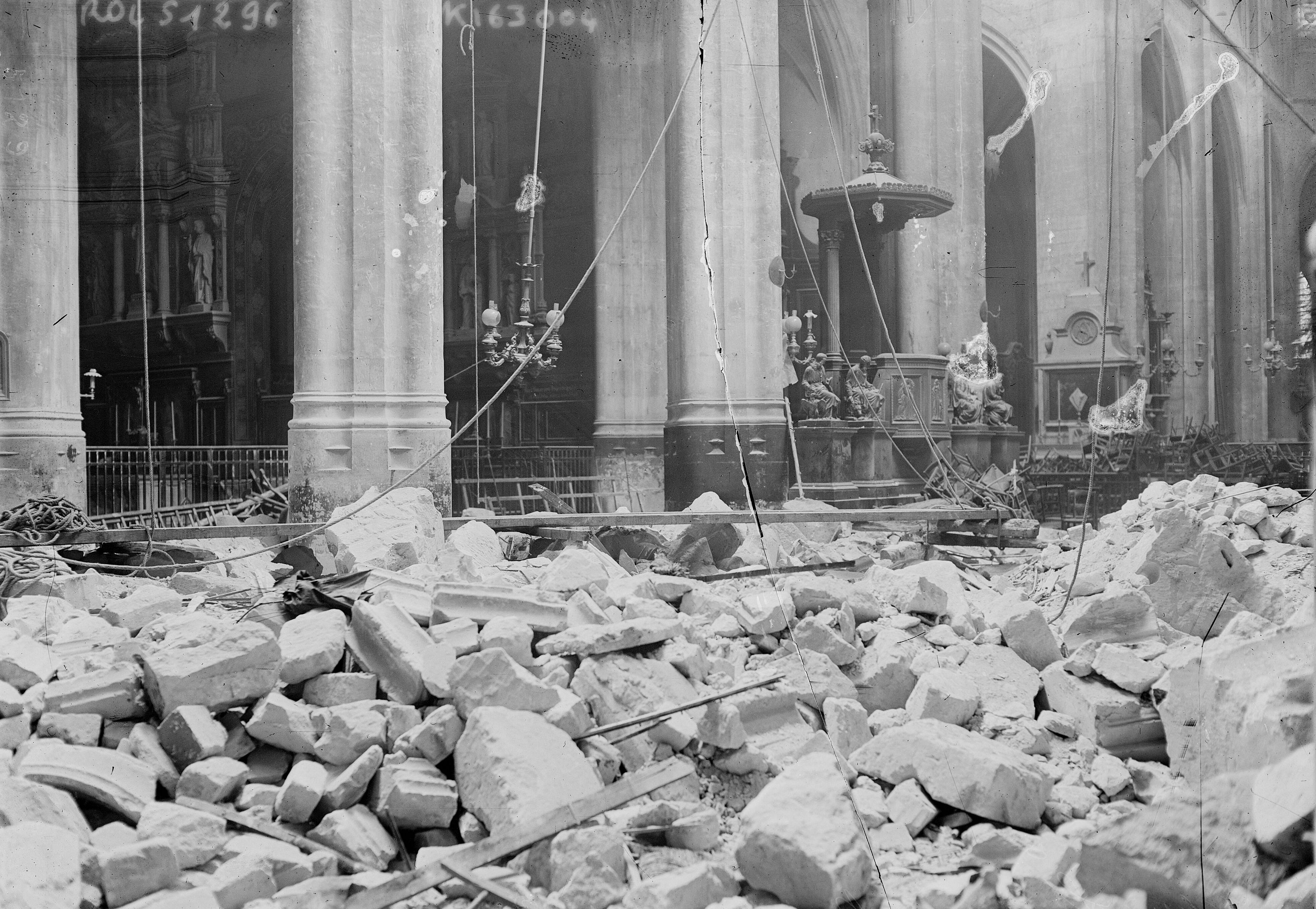
The damage to St-Gervais-et-St-Protais Church (1918)

The Paris gun was used to shell Paris at a range of 120 km (75 mi). The gun was fired from a wooded hill (Le mont de Joie) near Crépy, and the first shell landed at 7:18 a.m. on 23 March 1918 on the Quai de la Seine, the explosion being heard across the city. Shells continued to land at 15-minute intervals, with 21 counted on the first day. On the first day, fifteen people were killed and thirty-six wounded. The effect on morale in Paris was immediate: by 27 March, queues of thousands had started at the Gare d'Orsay and, at the Gare Montparnasse, ticket sales out of the capital were suspended due to demand.

The initial assumption was these were bombs dropped from an airplane or Zeppelin flying too high to be seen or heard, (Note: This was not an unreasonable assumption, as Zeppelins on night-time air-raids over the United Kingdom had previously used the tactic of cutting their engines when upwind of the target, then releasing their bombs as they silently drifted overhead. Also in the preceding months the city had been subjected to regular air-raids by German bomber aircraft.) or perhaps an "aerial torpedo". Within a few hours, sufficient casing fragments had been collected to show that the explosions were the result of shells, not bombs. By the end of the day, military authorities were aware the shells were being fired from behind German lines by a new long-range gun, although there was initial press speculation on the origin of the shells. This included the theory they were being fired by German agents close by Paris, or even within the city itself, so abandoned quarries close to the city were searched for a hidden gun. Another possibility was that German forces had penetrated the front line, but authorities realized that such heavy artillery could not be moved and emplaced so quickly.

The press reported the German gun's range as about 100 kilometres (60 mi), which amazed American ordnance officers, and the shells as 240 millimetres (9.4 in), compared to the 430-millimetre (17 in) caliber of heavy German siege shells. The previous world distance record was German bombardment of Dunkirk from 35 kilometres (22 mi), while the best American gun had a range of 31 kilometres (19 mi). The record was subsequently exceeded by the German Batterie Pommern at Koekelare, whose modified 38 cm SK L/45 "Max" gun could bombard Dunkirk from about 45 km (28 mi) away, with its shells reaching heights of roughly 10 km (6.2 mi), making Batterie Pommern the largest coastal artillery battery in the world in 1917. Experts thought that the German weapon might be a product of the Škoda Works. Three emplacements for the gun were located within days by the French reconnaissance pilot Didier Daurat, the path of the shells which landed in Paris having revealed the direction from which they were being fired. The closest emplacement was engaged by a 34 cm railway gun while the other two sites were bombed by aircraft, although this failed to interrupt the German bombardment.

Between 320 and 367 shells were fired, at a maximum rate of around 20 per day. The shells killed 250 people and wounded 620, and caused considerable damage to property. The deadliest incident was on 29 March 1918, when a shell hit the roof of the St-Gervais-et-St-Protais Church, collapsing the roof onto the congregation then hearing the Good Friday service. A total of 91 people were killed and 68 were wounded. There was no firing between 25 and 29 March, when the first barrel was being replaced; an unconfirmed intelligence report claimed that it had exploded. Barrels were probably changed again between 7–11 April and again between 21–24 April. The diameter of the later shells increased from 21 to 24 cm (8.3 to 9.4 in), indicating that the used barrels had been re-bored.

A further emplacement, later identified as specifically designed for the Paris Gun, was found by advancing US troops at the beginning of August, on the north side of the wooded hill at Coucy-le-Château-Auffrique, (Note: Position 49°31′40.43″N 3°18′17.57″E) some 86 kilometres (53 mi) from Paris.

The gun was taken back to Germany in August 1918 as Allied advances threatened its security. No guns were ever captured by the Allies. It is believed that near the end of the war they were completely destroyed by the Germans. One spare mounting was captured by American troops in Bruyères-sur-Fère, near Château-Thierry, but the gun was never found; the construction plans seem to have been destroyed as well.

== After World War I ==
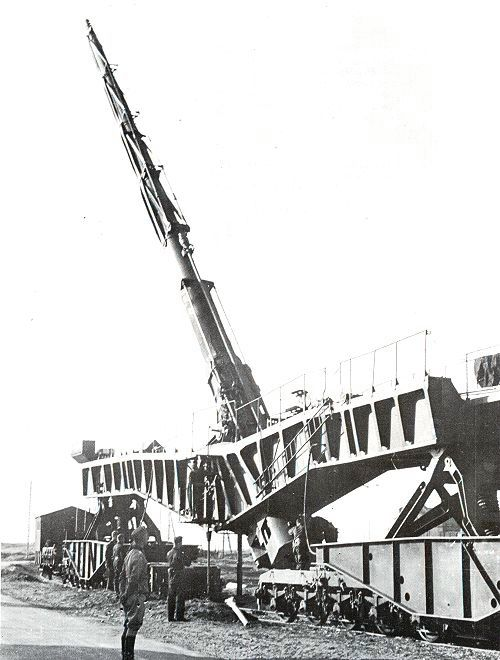
A K 12 railway gun elevated to the firing position

Under the terms of the Treaty of Versailles, the Germans were required to turn over a complete Paris Gun to the Allies, but they never complied with this.

In the 1930s, the German Army became interested in rockets for long-range artillery as a replacement for the Paris Gun – which had been specifically banned under the Versailles Treaty. This work eventually led to the V-2 rocket that was used in World War II.

Despite the ban, Krupp continued theoretical work on long-range guns. They started experimental work after the Nazi government began funding the project upon coming to power in 1933. This research led to the 21 cm K 12 (E), a refinement of the Paris Gun design concept. Although it was broadly similar in size and range to its predecessor, Krupp's engineers had significantly reduced the problem of barrel wear. They also improved mobility over the fixed Paris Gun by making the K 12 a railway gun.

The first K 12 was delivered to the German Army in 1939 and a second in 1940. During World War II, they were deployed in the Nord-Pas-de-Calais region of France; they were used to shell Kent in Southern England between late 1940 and early 1941. One gun was captured by Allied forces in the Netherlands in 1945.

== In popular culture ==
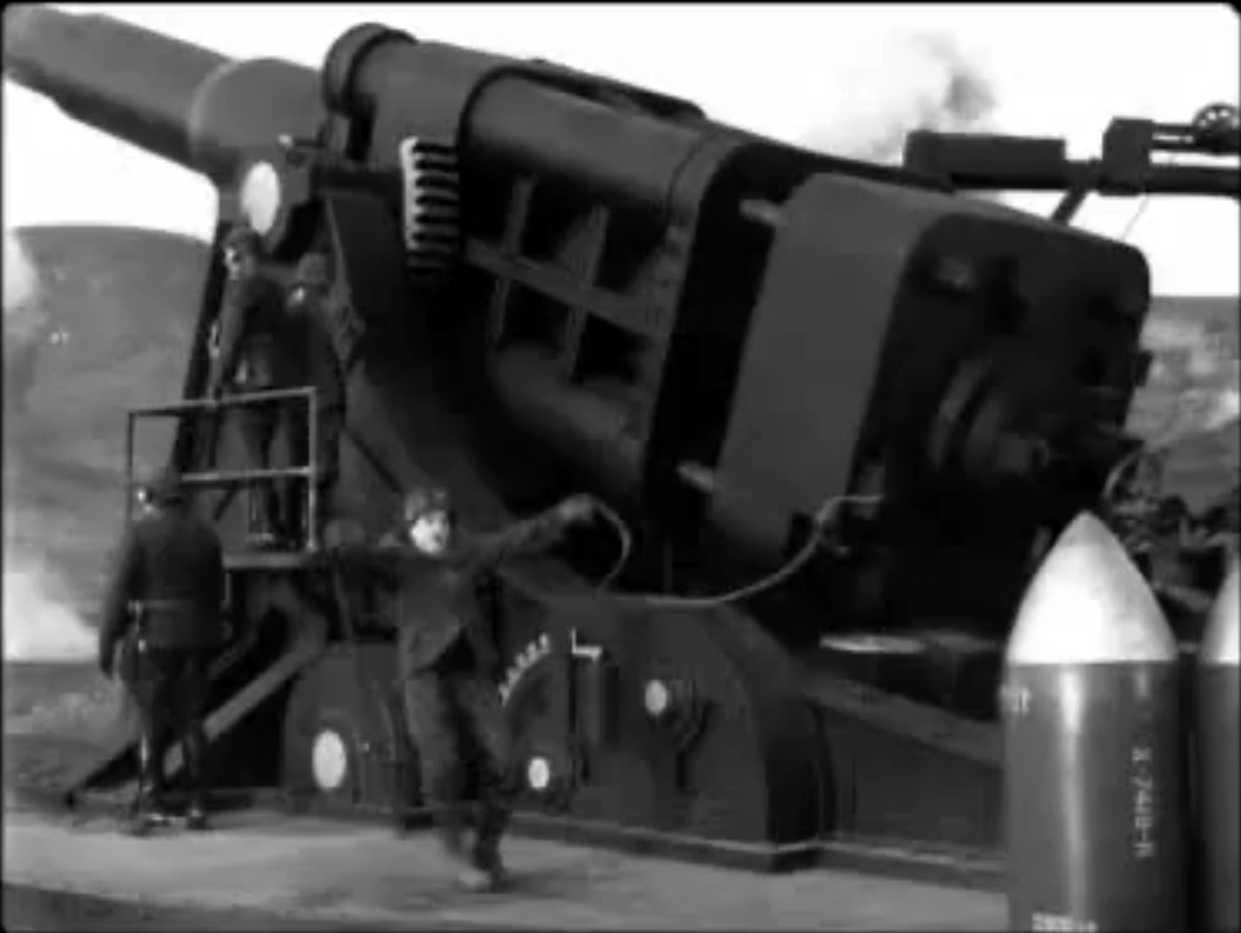
"Big Bertha" in the Charlie Chaplin film The Great Dictator.

A parody of the Paris Gun appears in the Charlie Chaplin movie The Great Dictator. Firing at the Cathedral of Notre Dame, the "Tomanians" (the fictional country that represented Germany) succeed in blowing up a small outhouse.

The destruction of the St-Gervais-et-St-Protais Church inspired Romain Rolland to write his novel Pierre et Luce.

== See also ==
- Krupp K5, a 283 mm (11.1 in), World War II German gun with a 64-kilometre (40 mi) range.
