= 2nd Light Regiment (Belgium) =

- Active: 1940
- Disbanded: 28 May 1940
- Country: Belgium
- Branch: Belgian Army
- Type: Quartermaster regiment
- Role: Support
- Size: Regiment
- Part of: Independent
- Garrison/HQ: Kortrijk
- Engagements: Battle of Belgium (World War II)

The 2nd Light Regiment (2LR), was a voluntary gendarmerie regiment of the Belgian Army that served in the Battle of Belgium and in the German Occupation of Belgium during World War II.

== World War II ==
Two regiments were formed out of the Territorial Gendarmerie Police Force of Belgium. The 1st and the 2nd Light Regiment. As a local police based unit, the 2nd Light Regiment was formed out of units that had served in the First World War, and thus, already had veterans that can become the base for its manpower. Along with the Infantry (Police), the regiments would be supported by platoon engineers and motorized vehicles, one platoon for one group of the regiment. The 2nd Light Regiment was split into two groups.

At the start of hostilities on May 10, 1940, the 2nd Light Regiment was given command of the 13ID Cyclists from the 13th Infantry Division. The groups that made up the 2nd Light Regiment, for the rest of the Battle of Belgium, were Group I, and Group II.

Group I had been recalled to Denize and Group II was sent back to Brussels, both now suited for roles carrying out anti-parachute patrolling. Supplies from Group I were sent to 16th Infantry Division. Group II fortified Brussels with positions. Group II then becomes under the command of VI Corp, which had retreated to the K-W line.

After a breakthrough at Sedan, the Allied Forces abandoned the K-W line. Without outside support, the Belgians also had to retreat. Group II had to abandon Brussels. Group I remains in Denize. Group II had to divert most of its forces (4th, 5th, & 6th squadrons) to secure the flanks along the front. The remainder retreat to Melle. Group I was ordered to fall back to the headquarters of the High Command, Sint-Denijs-Westrem.

Group I had to move again, back to Landegem. The 5th Squadron, after heavy fighting, managed to conduct a withdrawal west, and moved south to join the regiment. The rest of the independent squadrons (4, & 6) did the same.

After more threats, Group I was relocated to Bovekerke. Although now in the city of Bovekerke, the two groups never linked. After a brief loss in leadership from multiple accidents, both Groups I and II were sent to Kortrijk to await further orders. The Rijkswachters, experienced police of the regiment, were sent south to defend the southern sector of Leperlee.

Now under the command of IV Corp, Groups I and II of the 2nd Light Regiment were sent to positions between Roeselare and Menen. Group I were sent to Westrozebeke, and the Group II to Hooglede. Group I lost its 1st Squadron due to a lack to communication.

Due to delays, both groups I and II have not arrived at their defenses. Group II was sent back to cover the retreat for the 8th Infantry Division. And Group I was sent back to secure the flanks of the 2nd Division of the Ardennes Hunters.

Tielt was infiltrated by a German squadron from the 30th Infantry Division as the entire 2nd Light Regiment begins an attack. The Squadrons of Group I attacked first, was eventually halted by German artillery. Group II remained near Ardooie. Orders to regroup near Tornhout were ignored.

With no hope of regrouping, Group I had to surrender to the Germans. Surprisingly, none were sent to captivity as the Germans knew the value of the Gendarmerie as police in Belgium. After the rest of the Belgian Army surrendered, Group II also had to lay down their weapons.

After the battle, some of the Gendarmerie Police returned to their duties, now under German occupation. These men included some experienced officers of the Rijkswachters. The rest all either retired or joined the Belgian resistance. After Belgium was liberated in 1944, many of the resistance fighters returned to their duties.

== Structure 1940 ==
Structure of the Regiment at the eve of the Battle of Belgium: • Headquarters, at Kortrijk
• Commanding Officer, 2nd Light Regiment -Colonel- Georges Leclaire

=== Group I (I Battalion) ===
• 1st Squadron (Motorcyclists, Commanding Cadet, H. Dethine)
• 2nd Squadron (Motorcyclists, Commanding Captain, A. Reynders)
• 3rd Squadron (Supporting Arms, Commanding Captain, Matagne)

=== Group II (II Battalion) ===
• 4th Squadron (Motorcyclists, Commanding Cadet, Lurquin)
• 5th Squadron (Motorcyclists, Commanding Cadet, Gillaux)
• 6th Squadron (Supporting Arms, Commanding Cadet, Massart)

=== Other organic units ===
• Stafeskadron Squadron
• Platoon Engineer
• Platoon of Transmission Troops

== See also ==
- 13th Infantry Division
- 16th Infantry Division
- Willebroek Canal
- 1st Light Regiment Gendarmerie
