= 1st Light Regiment of the Gendarmerie (Belgium) =

1st Light Regiment
- Active: 1940
- Disbanded: 28 May 1940
- Country: Belgium
- Branch: Belgian Army
- Type: Quartermaster Regiment
- Role: Support
- Size: Regiment
- Part of: Independent
- Garrison/HQ: Charleroi
- Engagements: Battle of Belgium (World War II)

The 1st Light Regiment (1LR) was a voluntary Gendarmerie regiment of the Belgian Army that served in the Battle of Belgium and in the German Occupation of Belgium.

== World War II ==
Basic Source:

Two regiments were formed out of the Territorial Gendarmerie Police Force of Belgium. The 2nd and the 1st Light Regiment. As a local Police based unit, the 1st Light Regiment was formed out of units that had served in the First World War, and thus, already had veterans that can become the base for its manpower. Mobilized in late 1939, the 1st Light Regiment has two platoons, each armed with 4 newly deployed Machine guns. The 1st Light Regiment will have two Groups, each with 3 squadrons.

When hostilities began on May 10, 1940, the 1st Light Regiment was at Charleroi, armed at the Belgian-French Border. The 1st Light Regiment dispatched multiple units to the north, becoming part of the defense of the K-W line. It was an important junction leading to the position of Namur, and therefore, needed to be protected.

After the breach of the Albert Canal, and the attack on the Capital, the 1st Light Regiment was sent north to prevent a German breakthrough. German bombardment continues, as several parachute reports occur in the Dense regions near Brussels.

The 1st Light Regiment was driven out of Brussels and scattered into the surrounding area. The 4th and 5th squadrons of Group II were sent away from the main Group, with 4th Squadron now in Antwerp, and 5th Squadron in reconnaissance missions.

For the 1st Light Regiment, reconnaissance was their main goal. After only 6 days into the battle, the Allies decided to abandon the K-W line, including Brussels. Without allied support, the Belgians also had to withdraw. The retreat was complete by the next day. Most of Group II is still on other sides of the front.

The regiment moves to Bovekerke, as now they were being held in reserve. Most of the professional Rijkswatchers of the 2nd Light Regiment were sent to Tielt, becoming part of the rearguard. This rearguard will be routed and mostly captured by May 24.

Now repositioned in the south, the 1st Light Regiment was placed in reserve. Retreating with the remains of the Belgian front, reorganization was needed. The 4th and 5th Squadrons of the II Group (Group II) merged into a single unit, consisting of only 3 platoons.

With little hope of support from the Allies, Colonel Dethise orders all Squadrons of the Regiment to gather at Bovekerke. Then, surrenders his regiment over to the Germans. The normal personnel and Infantry soldiers were immediately disarmed.

After the battle, some of the Gendarmerie Police returned to their duties, now under German occupation. These men included some experienced officers of the Rijkswachters. The rest all either retired or joined the Belgian resistance. After Belgium was liberated in 1944, many of the resistance fighters would return to their duties.

== Structure 1940 ==
Structure of the regiment at the eve of the Battle of Belgium

- Headquarters, at Charleroi
- Commanding Officer, 1st Light Regiment -Lieutenant- Colonel Oscar Dethise

=== Group I (I Battalion) ===
- 1st Squadron (Motorcyclists, Commanding Officer, Jules Mathieu)
- 2nd Squadron (Motorcyclists, Commanding Officer, Dury)
- 3rd Squadron (Anti-tank support, Commanding Officer, Camille Poncè)
- Platoon of Armored Vehicles (Armored Support, Commanding Officer, Deuwaele)

=== Group II (II Battalion) ===
- 4th Squadron (Motorcyclists, Commanding Officer, George Nicolay)
- 5th Squadron (Motorcyclists, Commanding Officer, Georges Pierrard)
- 6th Squadron (Anti-tank support, Commanding Officer, Camille Fagnant)
- Platoon of Armored Vehicles (Armored Support, Commanding Officer, Ajt. Abs)

=== Other organic units ===
- Staff Squadron
- Engineer Platoon (Organic)
- Platoon of Transmission Troops

== See also ==
- K-W line
- 2nd Light Regiment Gendarmerie (Belgium)
- Fallschirmjäger (Elite Airborne troops of Nazi Germany)
