= Site Lange Max =

- Location within Belgium
- Location: 'Site Lange Max', Clevenstraat 2, B 8680 Koekelare, West Flanders, Belgium
- Coordinates: 51.116893°N 2.982338°E
- Type: World War I Military Museum
- Owner: vzw Lange Max
- Parking: On site
- Website: www.langemaxmuseum.be

Site Lange Max is a private domain, 3 km (1.9 mi) from the center of Koekelare, Belgium. The domain is located at 3 km (1.9 mi) from the Käthe Kollwitz Museum in Koekelare, 6 km (3.7 mi) from the Vladslo German war cemetery and 10 km (6.2 mi) from Diksmuide.

== The Site ==
The site is located on an old farmyard and contains the remains of the former biggest gun in the world (1917), the Lange Max. The site also includes Lange Max Museum, the artillery platform of the Batterie Pommern, a mess, and the Cafeteria De Lange Max. The farmyard, mess, and artillery platform are protected heritage buildings. These elements together have ensured that the whole as village view was protected.

== War memorial ==
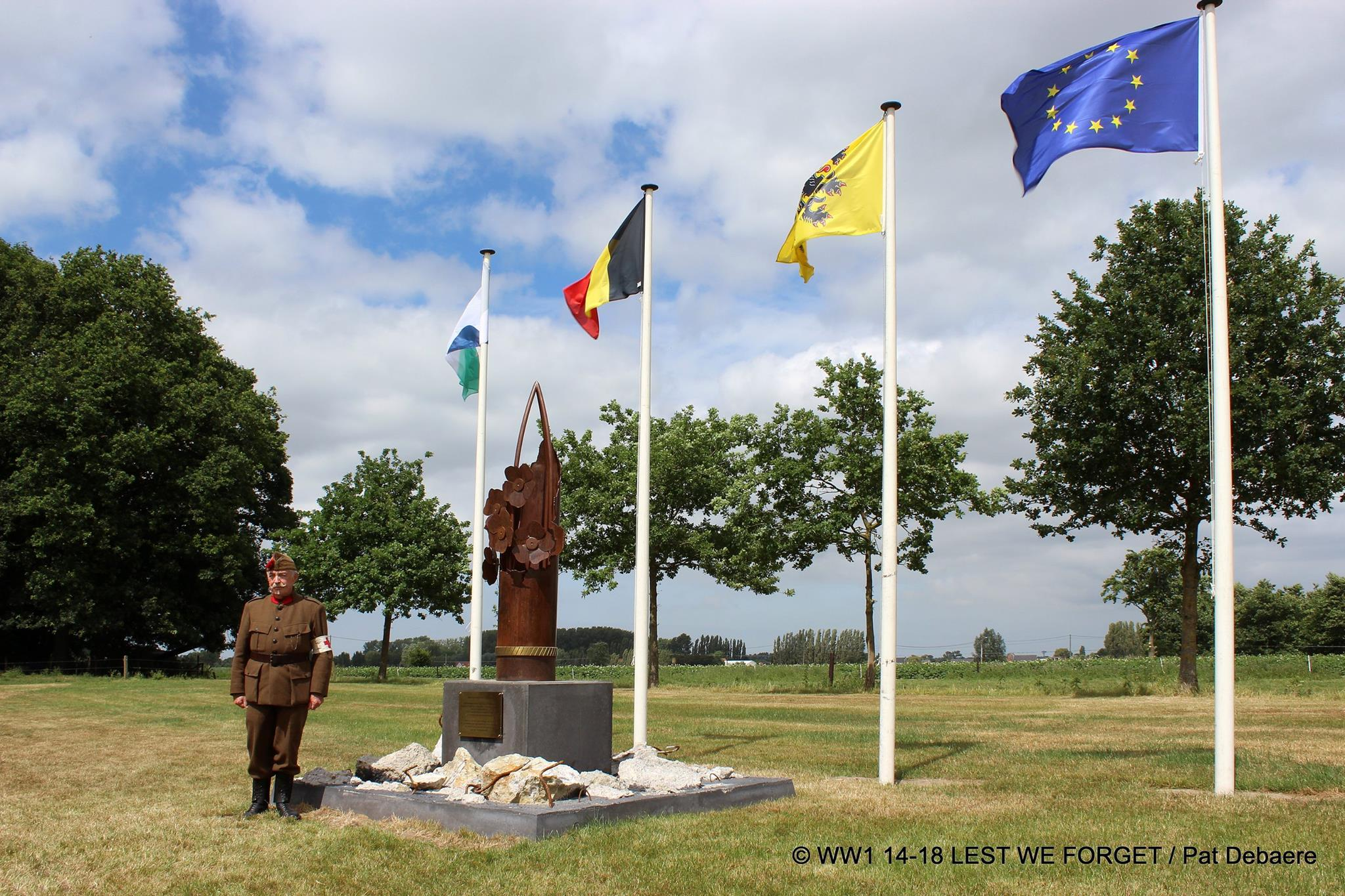
War memorial near the Lange Max Museum in Koekelare, Belgium.

On June 24, 2017, a new war memorial was revealed near the artillery platform of Lange Max.
