= Batterie Pommern =

German gun

Coordinates: 51.1169°N 2.9823°E

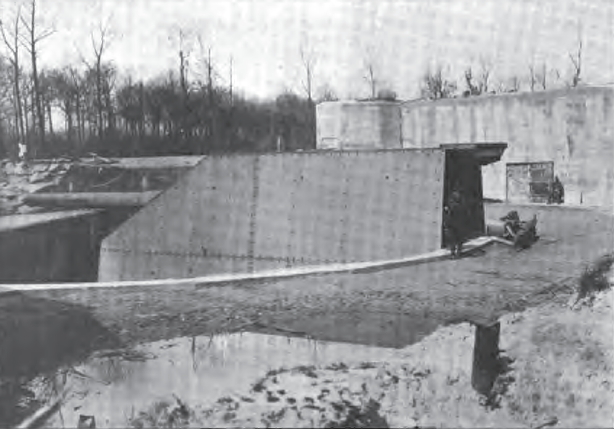
38-cm „Lange Max“ of Koekelare (Leugenboom), biggest gun of the world in 1917.

Batterie Pommern, also known as Lange Max, was the world's biggest gun in 1917, during World War I. The German gun was of type 38 cm SK L/45 "Max" and had a modified design by Krupp compared to earlier German 38 cm gun types. The modification allowed the gun to shoot from Koekelare to Dunkirk, which is about 50 km away.

== Location ==
Batterie Pommern is located in Koekelare (Belgium) in the neighborhood called Leugenboom. It is part of Site Lange Max, next to the Lange Max Museum. Today, the immense artillery platform can still be visited.

== Construction ==
The 15-inch (38 cm) long range gun, protected by armour, was mounted on a steel bridge having a pivot in front. The rear part of the gun travelled along a circular rail-track in a concrete pit of about 70 ft (21 m) in diameter. The gun was manoeuvred by means of electric motors. On either side were large shelters in reinforced concrete. In front of and below the platform was an electric generator group. A large shelter of reinforced concrete on the right was probably the post of the commandment. There was a dummy gun emplacement further on.

== History ==
On 27 June 1917 the gun fired for the first time. Its target was Dunkirk where the first shot was a direct hit. Dunkirk and Ypres were the main targets of the gun. During the Battle of Passchendaele it played a significant role for the Germans.

Without fully realizing it, they had created a gun capable of firing shells to an altitude of nearly 10 km (6.2 mi), effectively reaching the beginning of the stratosphere.

During the Interbellum the Pommern battery was one of the most successful attractions in the battlefield tourism in Belgium. It was featured in the Michelin Guide "L'Yser et la côte belge". Famous visitors to the Site Lange Max over time include:

- Winston Churchill, around the Interwar period.
- Hirohito, 124th Emperor of Japan
- Margaret Hall
- Woodrow Wilson
- King George V, King of the United Kingdom (10 December 1918).
- Prince Edward, Prince of Wales, future King of the United Kingdom and Emperor of India (10 December 1918).
- Prince George, future King of the United Kingdom and Emperor of India (10 December 1918).
- Raymond Poincaré, French President (9 November 1918).
- Ferdinand Foch, Marshal of France.
- Jules-Louis Breton, French Secretary of State for Inventions Interesting for National Defense, Secretary of State for War.
- Prince Leopold, future King of the Belgians (9 November 1918).
- Mr. and Mrs. Alfred Thomas Sharp, Commonwealth Immigration Officer of Victoria.
- William Washington Larsen, a United States Representative from Georgia (congressman) (1919).
- Gordon Lee, a United States Representative from Georgia (congressman) (1919).
- Geert Bourgeois, Minister-President of Flanders (October 2014).
- Eckart Cuntz, Ambassador of the Federal Republic of Germany (8 November 2014).
- Royal Thai Embassy to Belgium, (17 January 2015).
- Bart Tommelein, Vice Minister-President and Flemish Minister for Finance, Budget and Energy in the Bourgeois Government (March 2016).
- Sven Gatz, Flemish Minister for Culture, Youth, Media and Brussels in the Bourgeois Government (June 2016).
- Paul Breyne, Honorary Governor Province of West Flanders, Commissioner General WW1 (24 June 2017).

== Image gallery ==
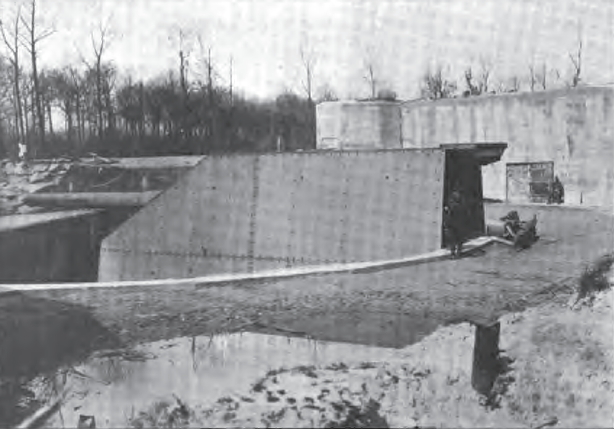
'Long Max' in Koekelare biggest gun of the world in 1917.

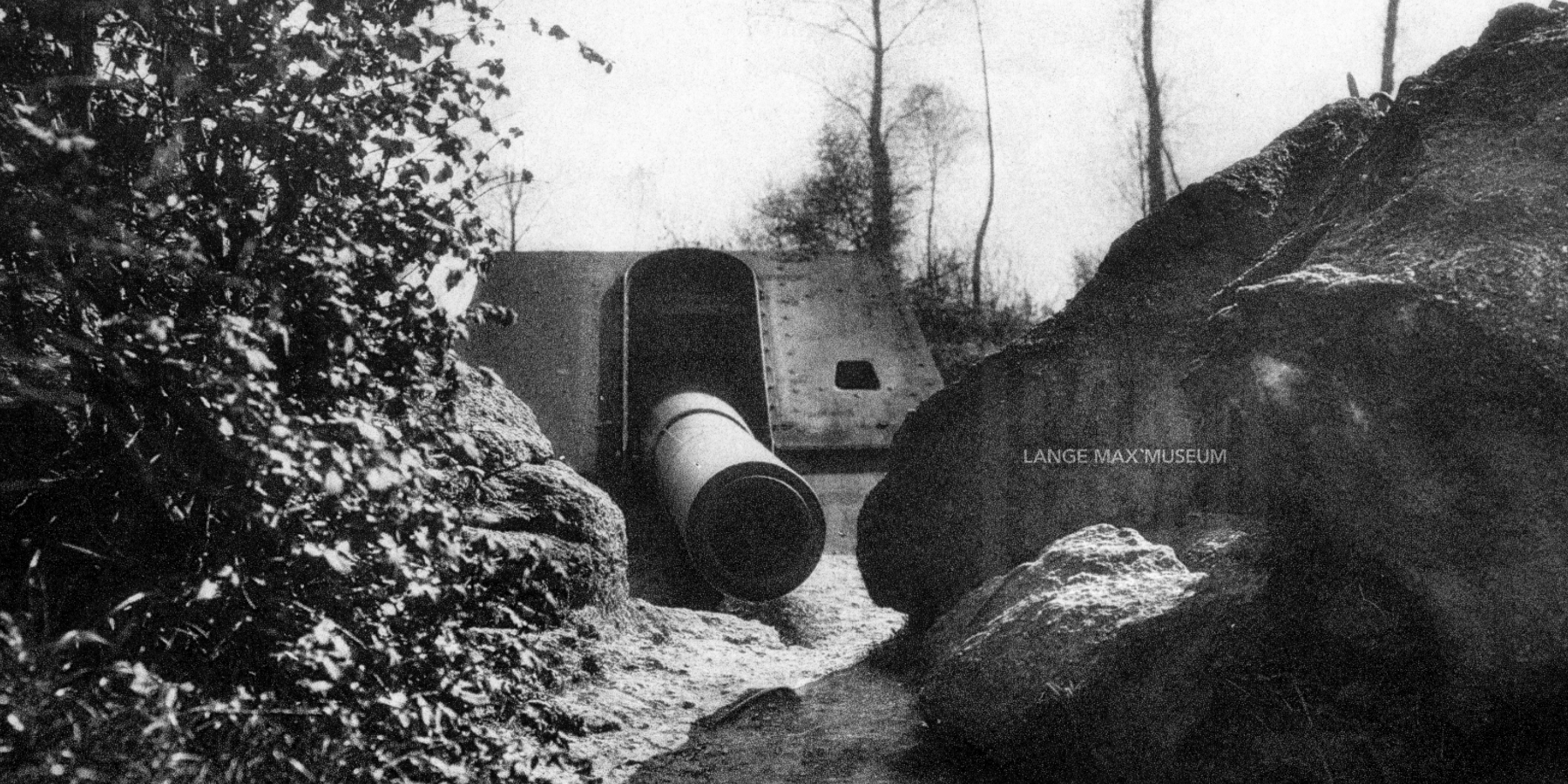
Long Max (also known as Leugenboom gun) in Koekelare.

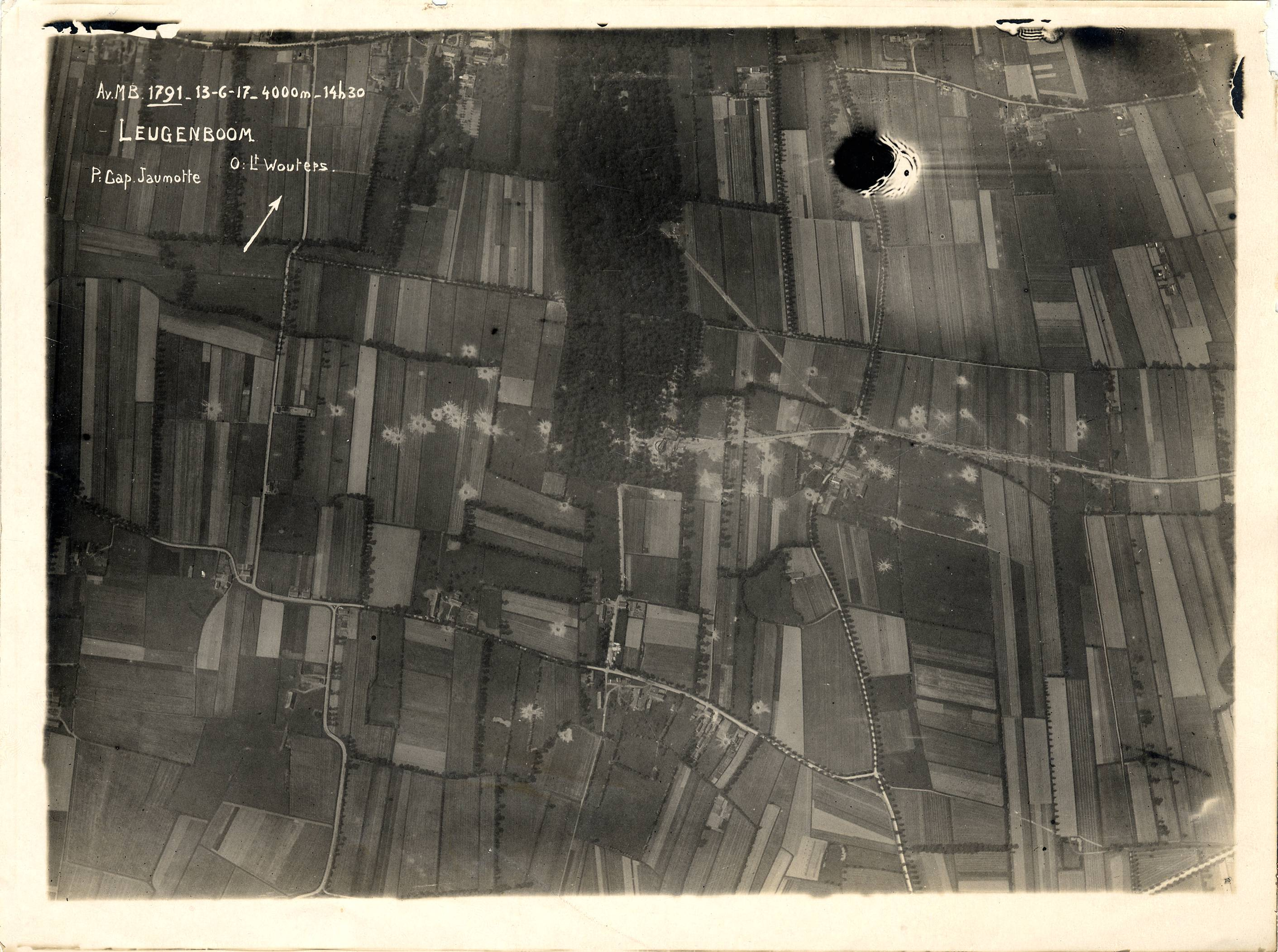
Picture of Battery Pommern (= 'Long Max' gun) in Koekelare
