= Lange Max Museum =

Long Max Museum
- Lange Max Museum
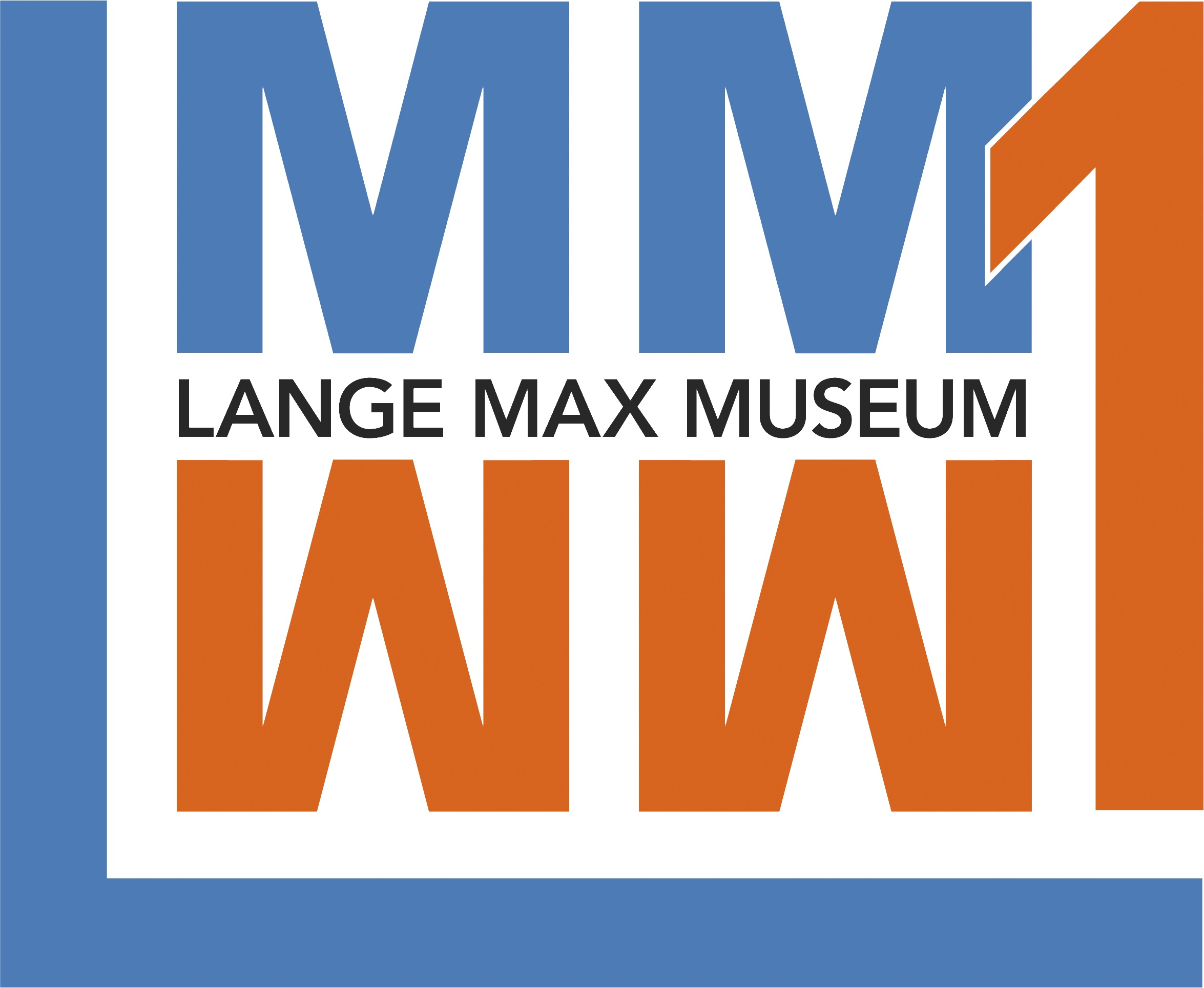
- Lange Max Museum

- Near Koekelare, Belgium
- Established: October 2014
- Location: Site Lange Max, Clevenstraat 2, B 8680 Koekelare, West Flanders, Belgium
- Coordinates: 51.116893°N 2.982338°E
- Type: World War I Military Museum
- Director: Rudy Willaert
- Curator: Gerdi Staelens
- Owner: vzw Lange Max
- Parking: On site
- Website: www.langemaxmuseum.be/

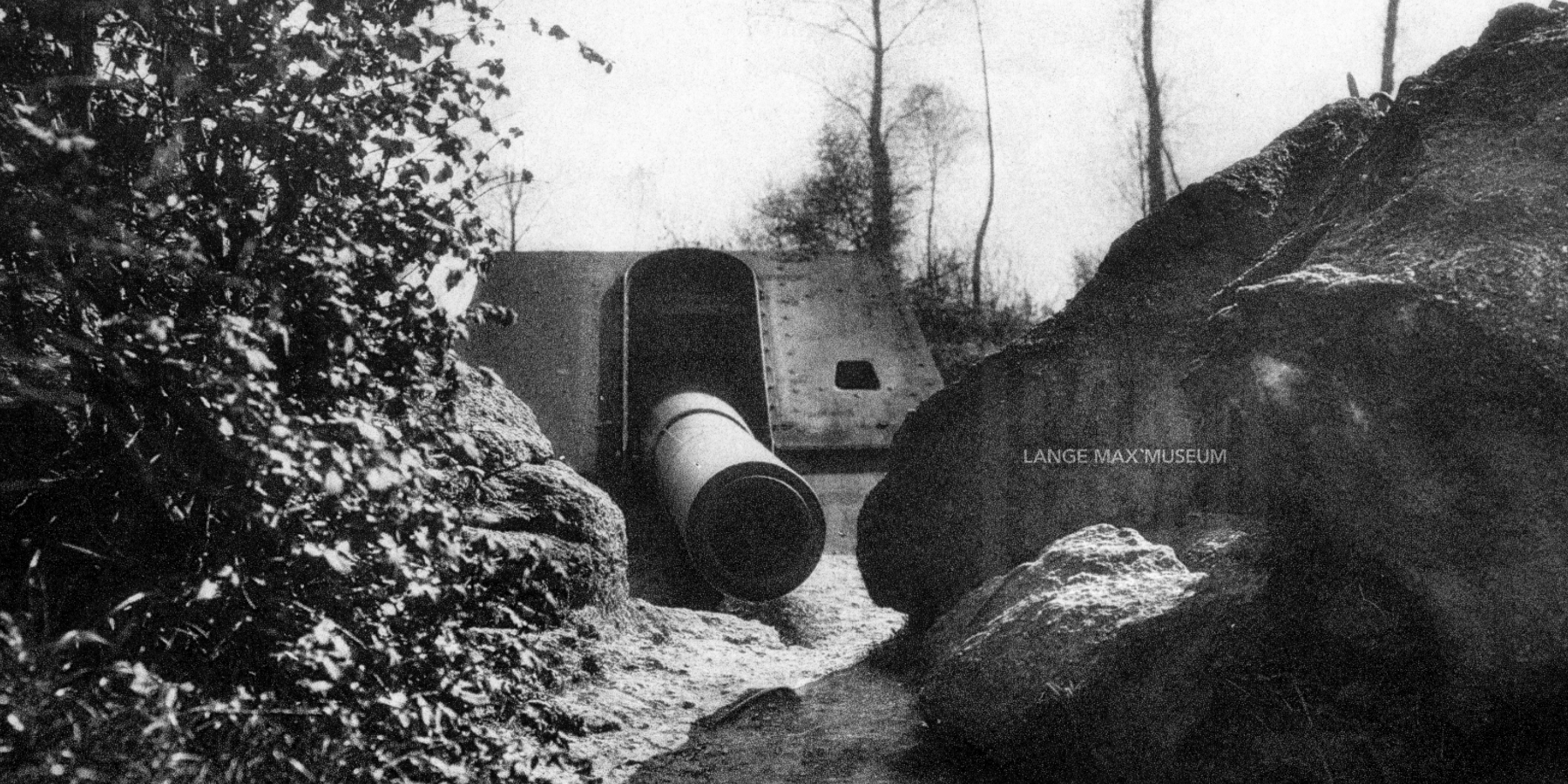
gun Long Max (Lange Max Museum)

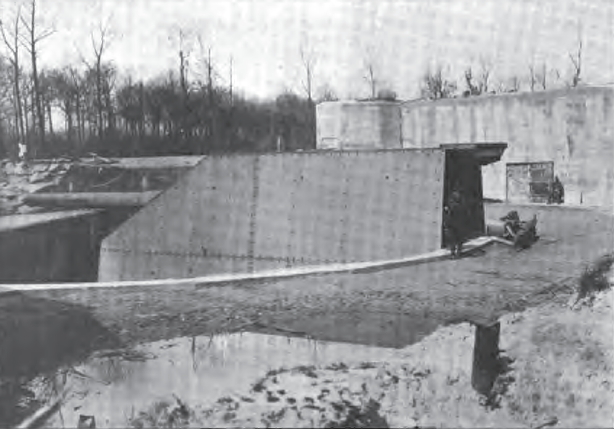
38-cm "Lange Max" of Koekelare (Leugenboom), one of the biggest guns in the world in 1917.

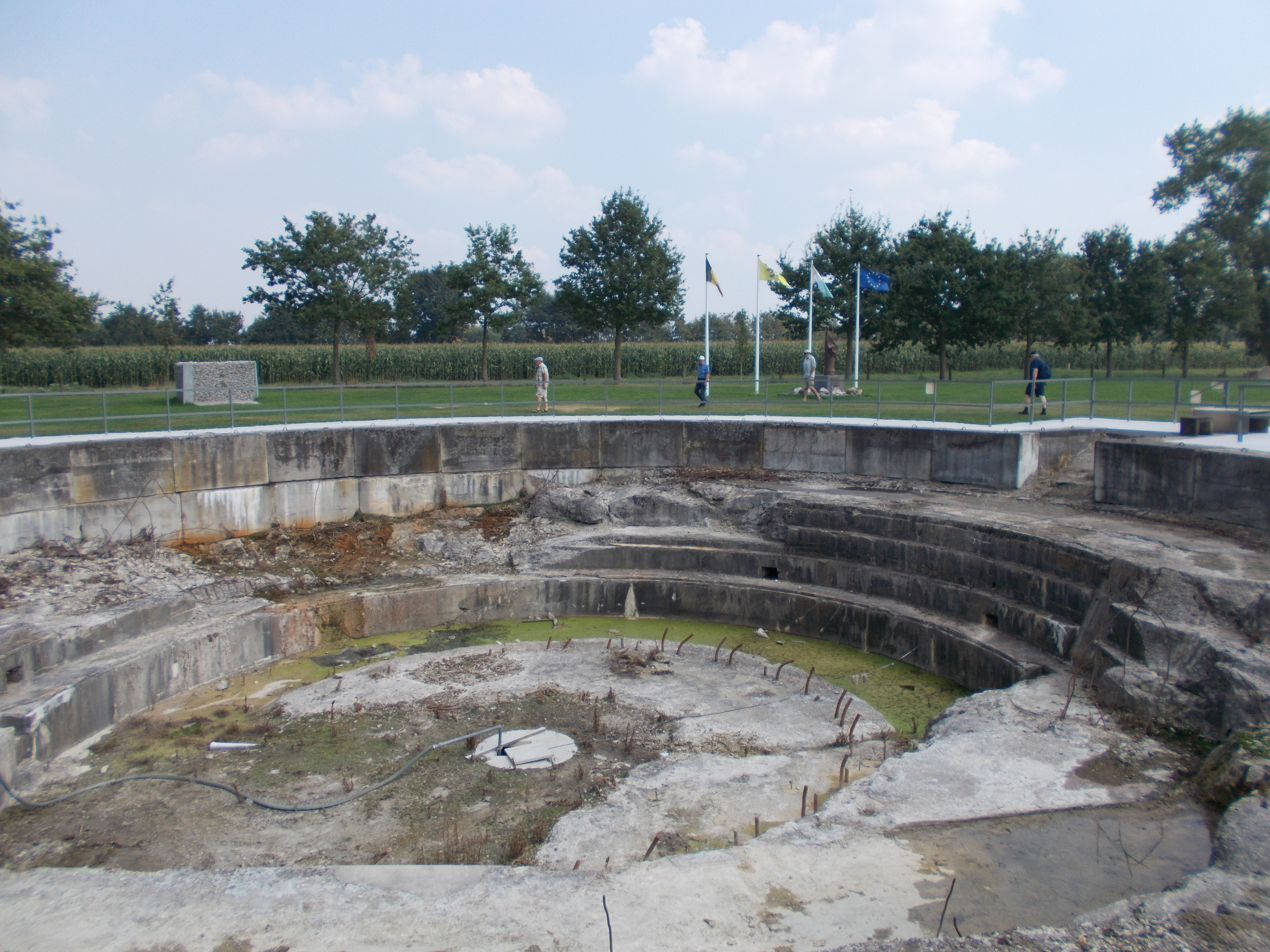
The remains of the artillery platform of the former German cannon "Long Max" in Koekelare, Belgium.

The Lange Max Museum (LMM) is devoted to the German 38 cm SK L/45 "Max" gun and the German occupation of Koekelare and the nearby area in World War I. The focus on the German side of the war makes it a unique museum in Belgium. The museum is named after the nickname of the German gun "Lange Max", which was one of the biggest guns in the world in 1917, and is located in Koekelare.

The museum was opened in October 2014 by the Minister-President of Flanders, Geert Bourgeois. It is located on a domain called Site Lange Max, which includes a farmyard. The site includes other protected monuments such as a bakehouse, the artillery platform and a former German mess.

The museum provides information about the "Lange Max" gun that bombarded Dunkirk and also Ypres in 1917 . Dunkirk is located at about ± 45 km from Koekelare. The information is available in four languages: Dutch, German, English and French. Audio guides in Dutch, English and German are also available.

== Notable visitors ==
During the Interbellum, the Pommern battery was one of the most successful attractions in battlefield tourism in Belgium. It was featured in the Michelin Guide "L'Yser et la côte belge". Notable visitors to the Site Lange Max over time include:

- Winston Churchill, around the Interwar period.
- Hirohito, 124th Emperor of Japan
- Woodrow Wilson, 28th President of the United States.
- Prince Edward, future King of the United Kingdom and Emperor of India (10 December 1918).
- Prince Albert, future King of the United Kingdom and Emperor of India (10 December 1918).
- Raymond Poincaré, French President (9 November 1918).
- Ferdinand Foch, Marshal of France.
- Jules-Louis Breton, France's Undersecretary of State for Inventions for National Defense.
- Prince Leopold, future King of the Belgians (9 November 1918).
- Geert Bourgeois, Minister-President of Flanders (October 2014).
- Bart Tommelein, Vice Minister-President and Flemish Minister for Finance, Budget and Energy in the Bourgeois Government (March 2016).
- Sven Gatz, Flemish Minister for Culture, Youth, Media and Brussels in the Bourgeois Government (June 2016).

== Nearby points of interest ==
- Hovaeremolen (Koekelare) which was used as an observation post during World War I
- Käthe Kollwitz Museum in Koekelare
- Fransmansmuseum in Koekelare
- Vladslo German war cemetery
- Yser Tower, memorial for the soldiers killed on the Yser Front during World War I
- Dodengang, World War I memorial site located near Diksmuide

== Temporary exhibitions ==
- Temporary Exhibition 2016 (2016-2017): "The effect of the inundation on German warfare" (Dutch: "De gevolgen van de onderwaterzetting voor de Duitse oorlogsvoering")
- Temporary Exhibition 2017 (2017-2018): "The III. Flandernschlacht in our region" (Dutch: "De III. Flandernschlacht in onze regio")

== Awards and recognition ==
- 2014: Culture award (Gerdi Staelens, for Lange Max Museum)
- 2015: Raf Seys Price
- 2015: Nomination Heritage Price 2015 West Flanders Province (one of the 20 projects selected out of 500 entries).
- 2016: Belgium's third best museum.

== Image gallery ==
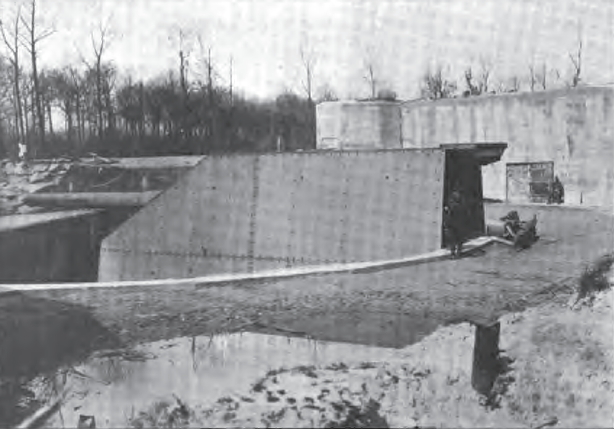
'Long Max' in Koekelare. Biggest gun in the world in 1917.

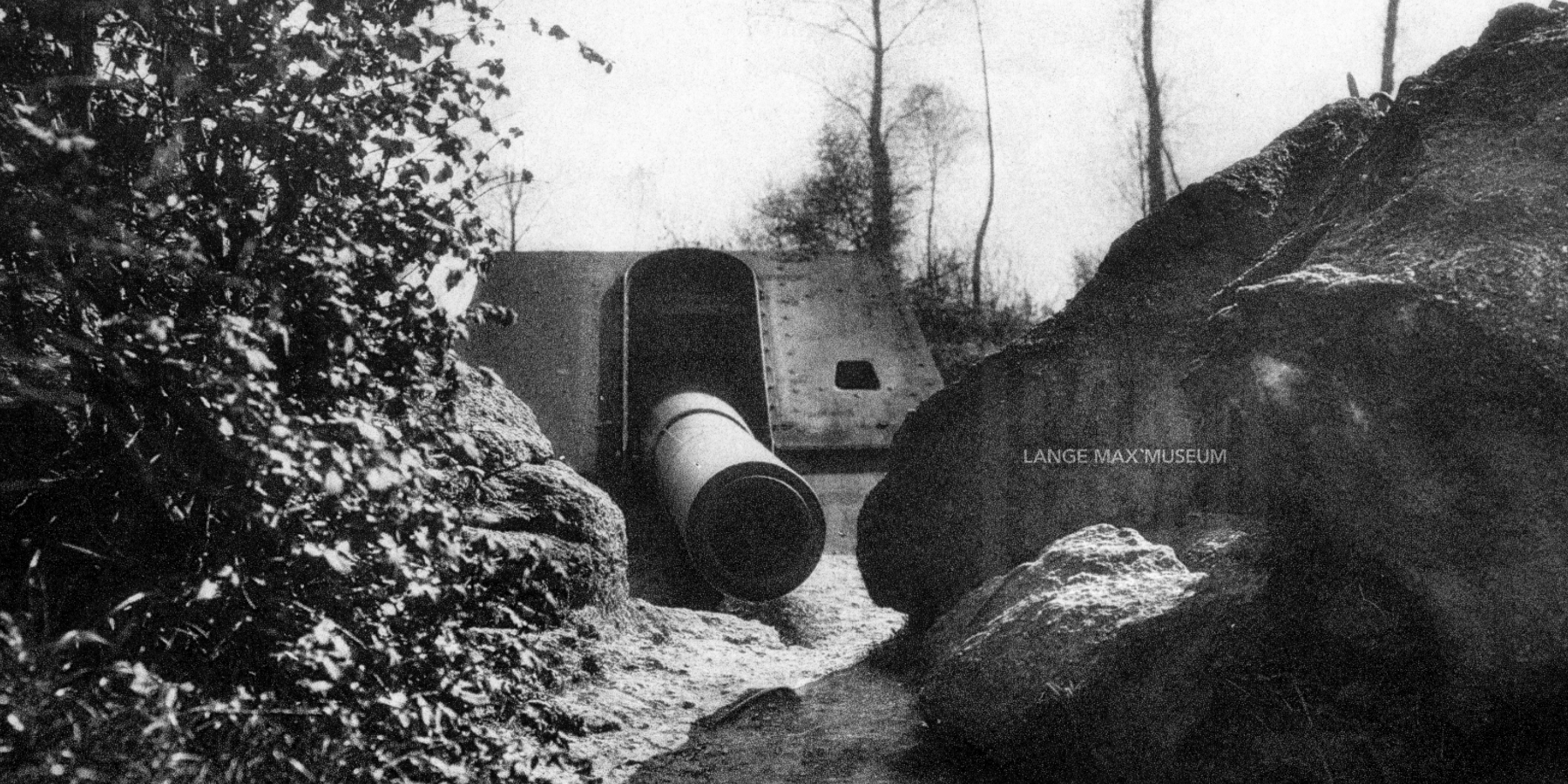
Long Max (also known as Leugenboom gun) in Koekelare.

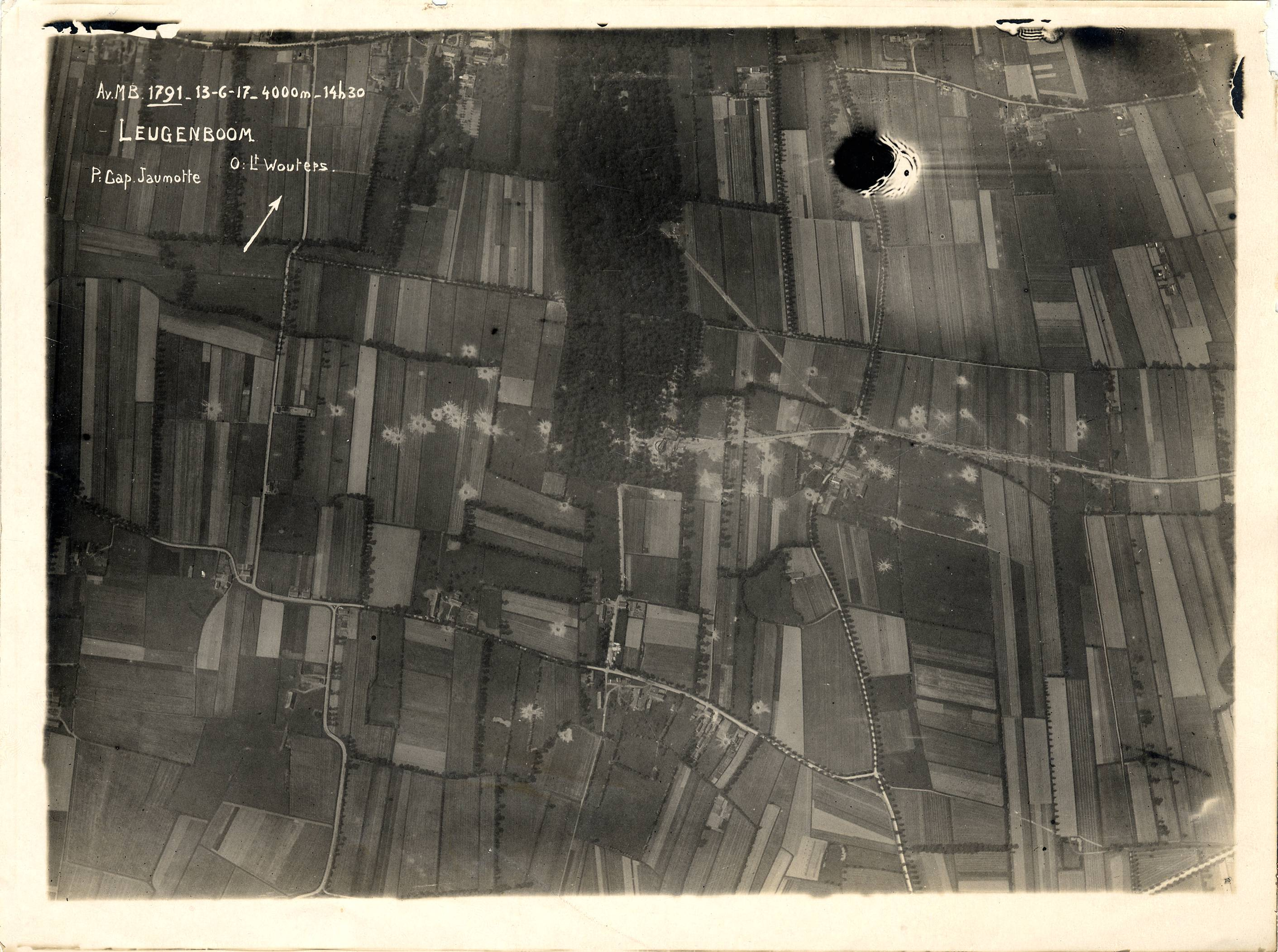
Picture of Battery Pommern (= 'Long Max' gun) in Koekelare

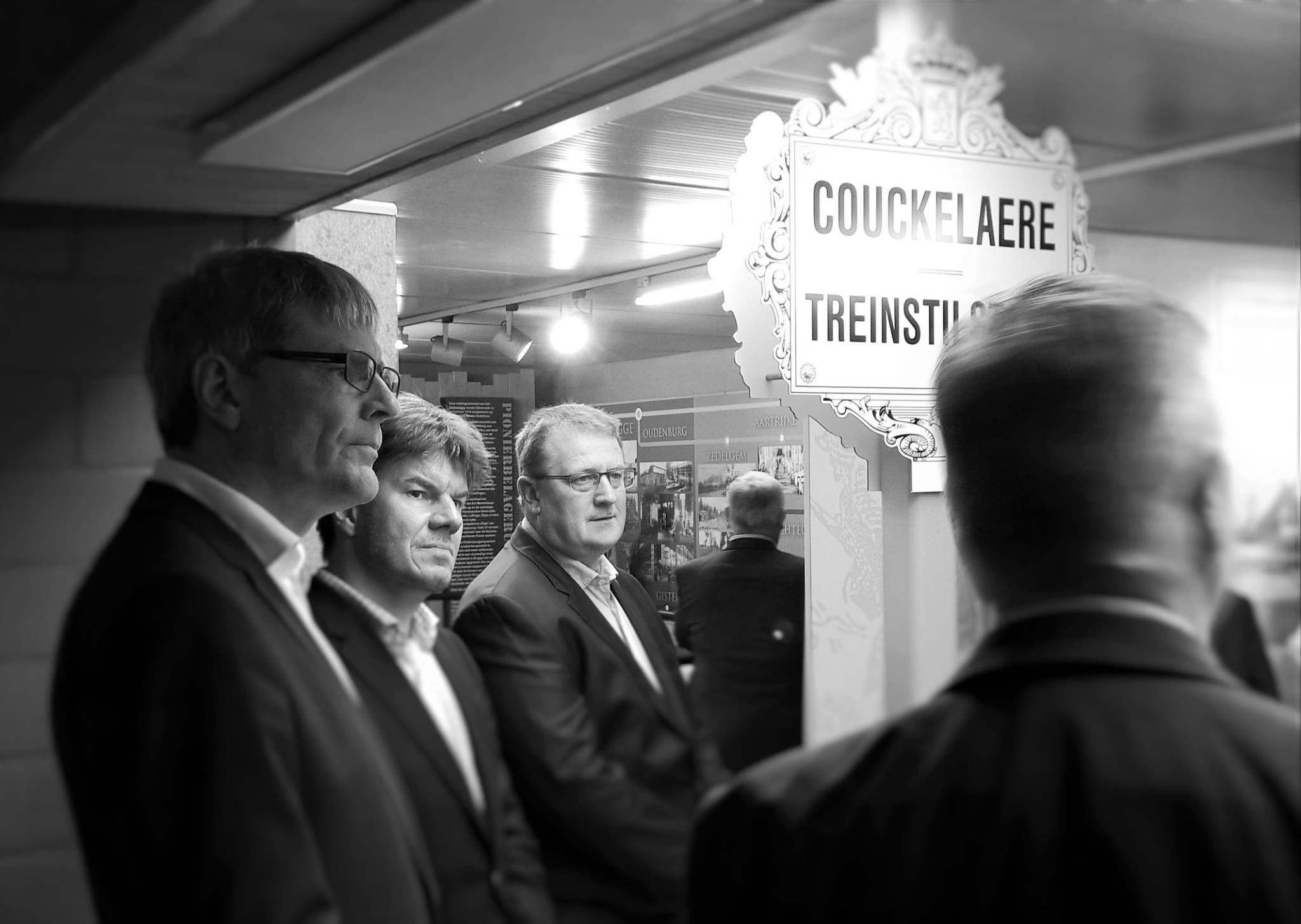
Flemish Minister for Culture Sven Gatz visiting the Lange Max Museum (June 2016).

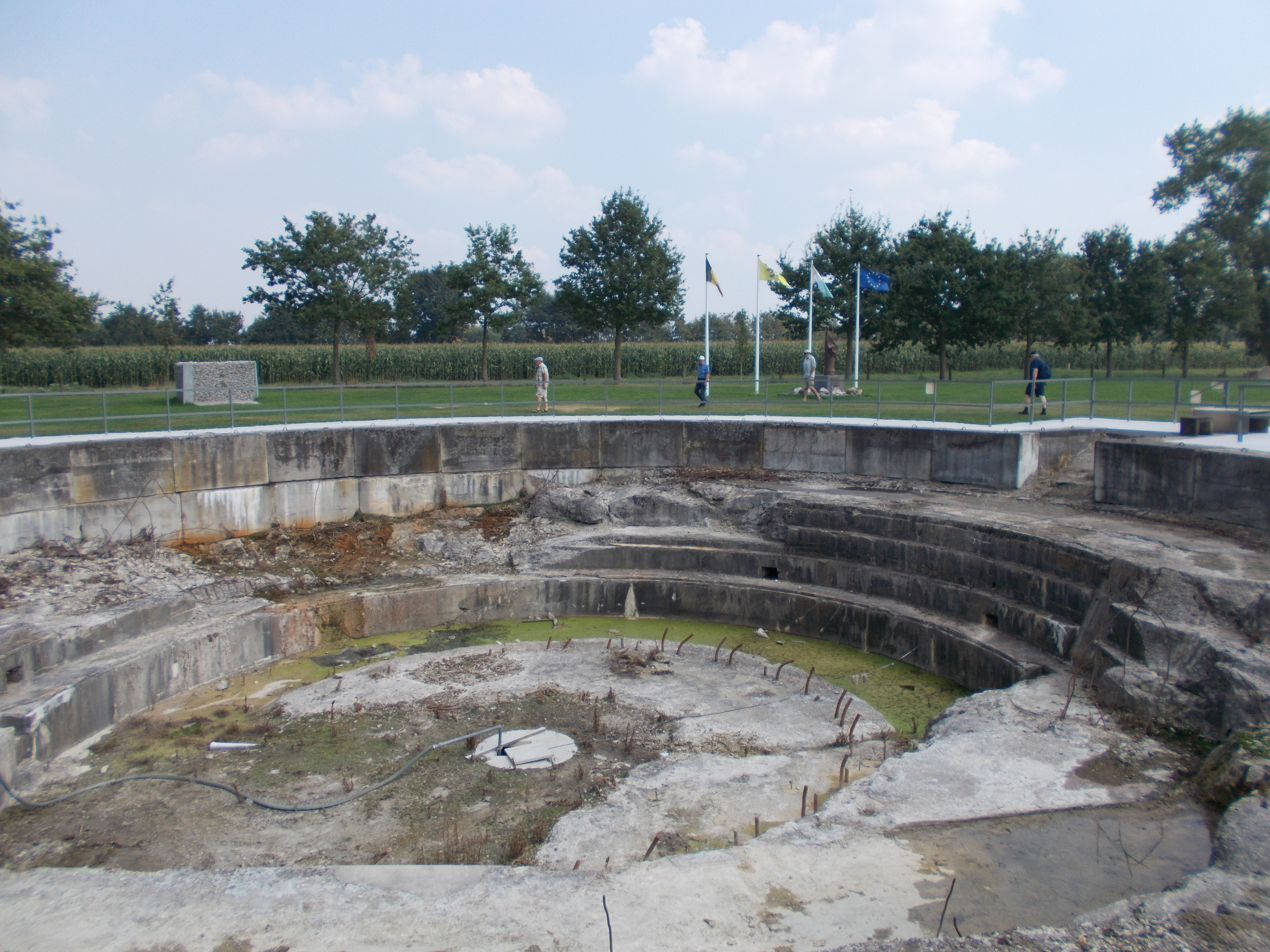
The remains of the artillery platform of the former German cannon "Long Max" in Koekelare, Belgium.
