= 21 cm K 12 (E) =

21 cm Kanone 12 (E)
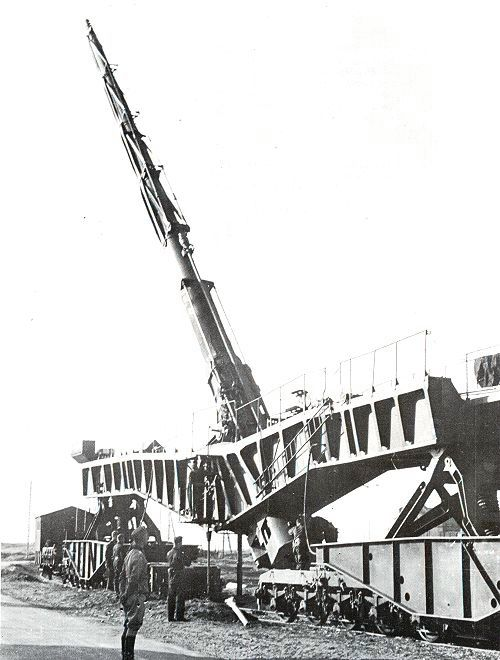
- A 21 cm K 12 V (E) ready to fire
- Type: Railway Gun
- Place of origin: Germany

Service history
- Used by: Nazi Germany
- Wars: World War II

Production history
- Designer: Krupp
- Designed: 1935–38
- Manufacturer: Krupp
- Produced: 1938–40
- No. built: 2
- Variants: K 12 V and K 12 N

Specifications
- Mass: 302 tonnes (297 long tons; 333 short tons) (K 12 V); 318 tonnes (313 long tons; 351 short tons) (K 12 N)
- Length: 41.3 metres (135 ft 6 in) (K 12 V); 44.945 metres (147 ft 5 in) (K 12 N)
- Barrel length: 33.3 metres (109 ft 3 in) (L/158)
- Shell: separate-loading, cased charge
- Caliber: 211 millimetres (8.3 in)
- Breech: horizontal sliding-block
- Recoil: hydro-pneumatic
- Carriage: 2 x 10-axle bogies (front); 2 x 8-axle bogies (rear)
- Elevation: 25° – 55°
- Traverse: 0° 25' on mounting 360° on Vögele turntable
- Muzzle velocity: 1,500–1,650 m/s (4,900–5,400 ft/s)
- Effective firing range: 45,000 m (49,120 yds - 28 miles)
- Maximum firing range: 115,000 m (125,765 yds - 71 miles)

The 21 cm Kanone 12 in Eisenbahnlafette (21 cm K 12 (E)) was a large German railroad gun used in the Second World War and deployed to fire on England from the English Channel coast in occupied France.

== Design and history ==
Krupp continued theoretical research on a replacement for the Paris Gun during the Weimar Republic-era, but it was the Nazi government that finally authorized funding for experiments to solve some of its worst problems.

The extremely high velocities used by the Paris Gun to attain the stratospheric heights necessary for extreme range caused enormous wear of the barrel, so much so that the shells had to be made in gradually increasing diameters to suit the rate of wear. Even then barrel life was merely 65 rounds. It is believed that the one Paris Gun destroyed by a premature detonation in the bore was caused by loading one of the serially numbered shells out of order.

Krupp decided to use only eight grooves in the barrel and to machine matching ribs or splines on the shells to eliminate the need for a massive copper driving band to start the shell spinning without shearing off, which had been one of the prime causes of the excessive barrel wear in the earlier weapon. Gas sealing would be handled by a copper band, mounted in the place normally occupied by the driving band, with an asbestos and graphite packing to form the initial seal.

Several test barrels, known as the 10.5 cm K 12 M, and shells were made in 1935 and were compared to a conventionally rifled barrel (the 10.5 cm K 12 MKu). The tests proved that Krupp's concept was correct.

The K 12 (E) was mounted on a simple box-girder carriage, which was carried on two subframes, which were in turn mounted on double bogies. The barrel was mounted in a ring cradle with a hydropneumatic recoil system. Two more hydropneumatic systems were connected to the subframes, which allowed the entire carriage to recoil some 98 centimeters (39 in). For transport, the gun itself was disconnected from its recoil system and drawn back some 1.5 meters (4.9 ft) to reduce the mounting's overall length and allow it to fit in the normal railroad loading gauge.

The barrel's extreme length required external bracing to prevent it from bending under its own weight. Its trunnions were placed as far forward as possible to balance the barrel and minimize the force necessary to elevate it. This placed the breech perilously close to the ground, and a hydraulic jacking system was built in each subframe to elevate the mount 1 meter (3.3 ft). However, it was impossible to load the weapon in this position, and it had to be lowered between every shot.

The K 12 (E) could be fired from any curved section of track, a Vögele turntable, or its special firing track. This prefabricated T-shaped track was carried on the gun train and deployed by a special crane wagon. Once the front bogies were at the crossover at the top of the T, they were then jacked up and turned with the subframe 90° and then lowered onto the crosstroke of the T. The gun was then traversed by an electric motor to the bogies, and it was clamped to the track once laid onto the target. It fired HE shells weighing 107.5 kilograms (237 lb).

The first weapon was completed in 1938 and delivered to the Army in March 1939. It was successful, although the necessity to jack it up and down between shots was not well received by the Army. Krupp discovered, on trying to rectify this problem, that hydro-pneumatic balancing presses could work at much greater weights and pressures than previously believed. They redesigned the mounting with the trunnions as far forward as possible and increased the recoil stroke to 150 centimeters (59 in.). The new design was delivered in mid-1940 and called the K 12 N (E). The first gun was retrospectively called the K 12 V (E).

They spent the war assigned to Artillerie-Batterie 701 (E) along the Channel coast. The British recovered shell fragments near Rainham, Kent, 88 kilometres (55 mi) from the nearest point on the French coast.

The Allies captured an example in 1945.
