= Margaret Hall (photographer) =

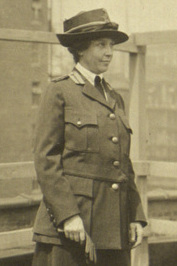
- Margaret Hall in Red Cross uniform, August 1918
- Born: 1876; Massachusetts
- Died: 1963 (aged 86–87)

Margaret Hall (1876 – 1963) was a volunteer for the American Red Cross during World War I and a photographer who captured images of the conflict.

Margaret Hall was a native of Newton, Massachusetts. She was from an affluent family and later inherited and ran her father's woolen mill. In 1899, she graduated from Bryn Mawr College with a degree in history and political science. She was a suffragist who marched in the 1913 Woman Suffrage Procession and also participated in the 1913 Ladies Garment Strike.

At the age of 42, she sailed to France as a volunteer for the American Red Cross. From September 1918 to July 1919, she worked about fifteen to twenty miles behind the front lines, at a canteen near a railroad junction in Châlons serving food to soldiers. Though photographs and diaries in the war zone were prohibited, Hall took hundreds of photographs, including the famous Batterie Pommern, and wrote extensively about her experience. It is speculated she used a small Vest Pocket Kodak and a larger camera with a tripod.

Following the war she continued to volunteer for various causes, including Armenian genocide survivors.

In 2014, the Massachusetts Historical Society published her work as Letters and Photographs from the Battle Country: The World War I Memoir of Margaret Hall.

== Gallery ==
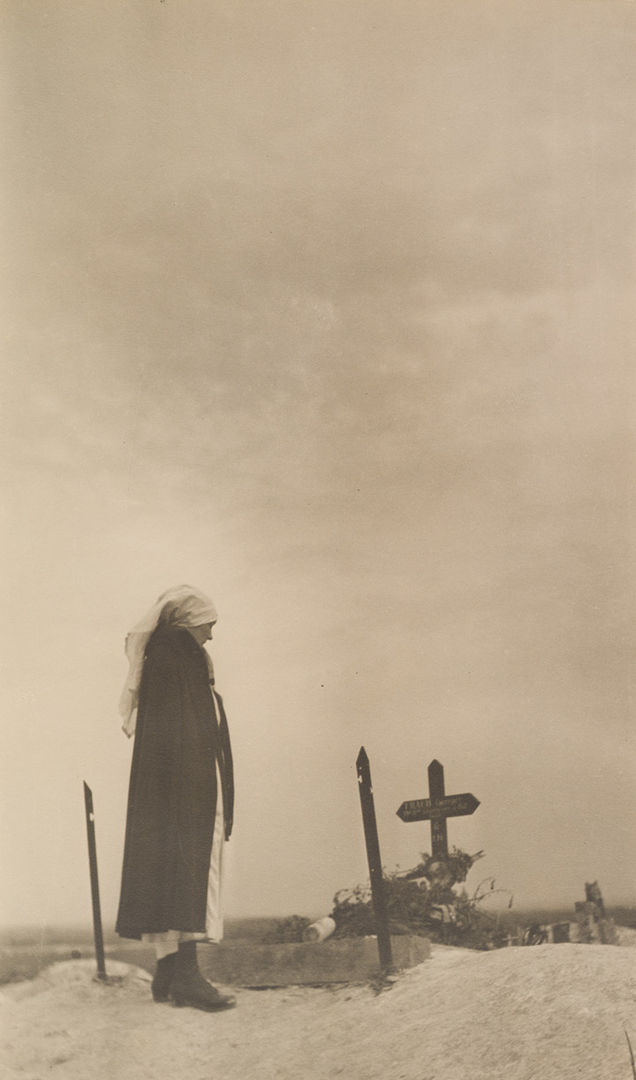
Margaret Hall (American, 1876–1963). Grave in "No Man's Land," 1918–1919

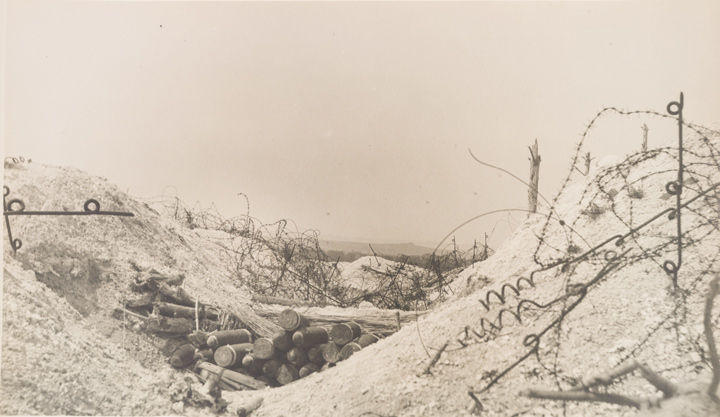
Margaret Hall (American, 1876–1963). German Barbed Wire and Trench, Champagne, 1918–19

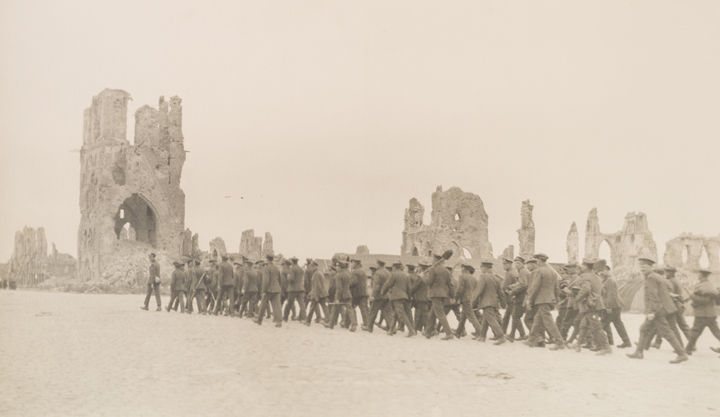
Margaret Hall (American, 1876–1963). Cloth Hall and Cathedral, Ypres, Tommies, 1919
