= Zande, Belgium =

Zande
- Deelgemeente
- Coordinates: 51°07′12″N 2°55′18″E
- Country: Belgium
- Province: West Flanders
- Municipality: Koekelare

Area
  - Total: 5.34 km^{2} (2.06 sq mi)

Population (1999)
  - Total: 302
  - Density: 57/km^{2} (150/sq mi)
- Source: NIS
- Postal code: 8680
- Area code: 059 & 051

Zande is a town in Koekelare, West Flanders, Belgium.

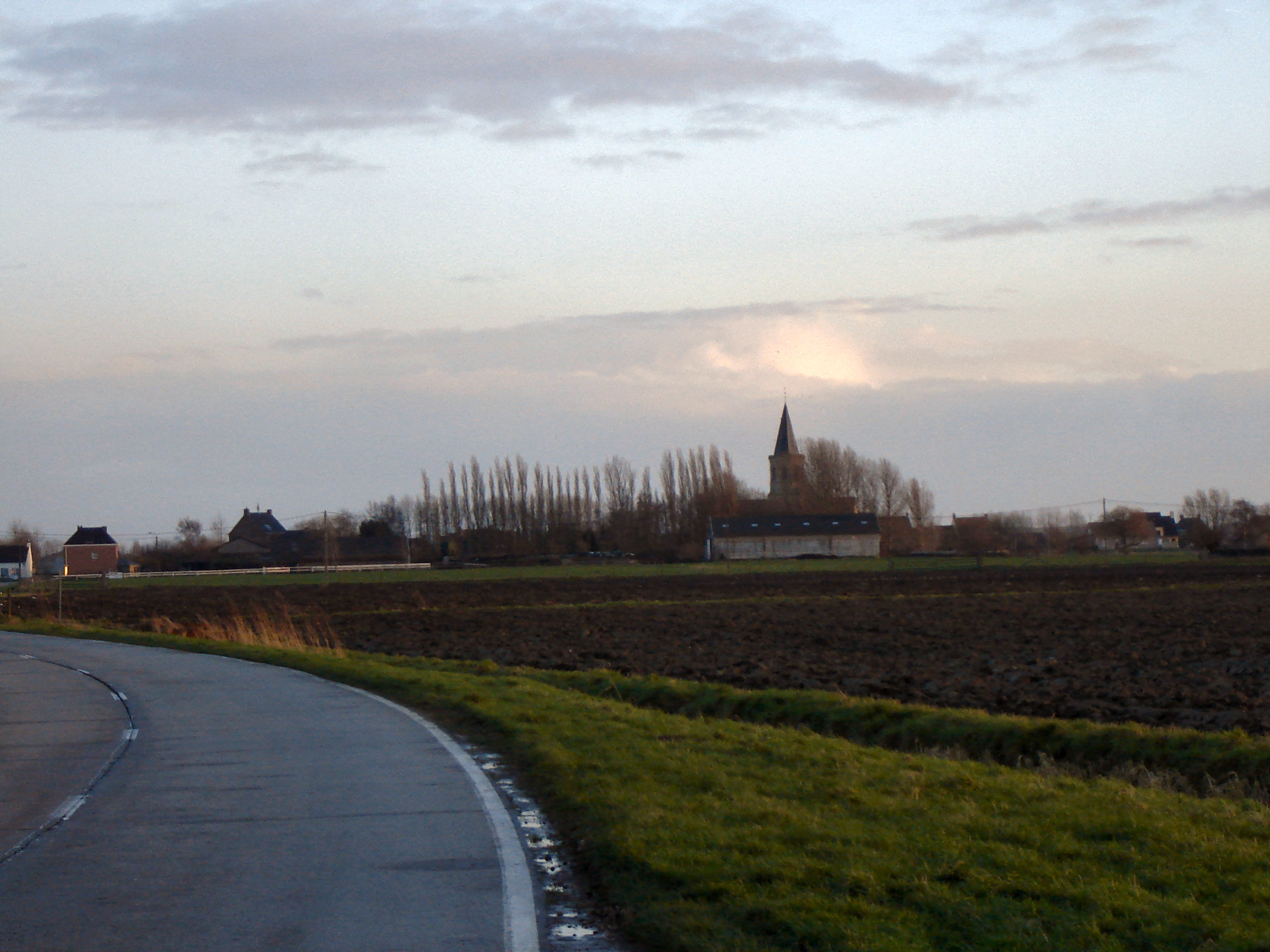
View on Zande
