= Koekelare =

- Municipality
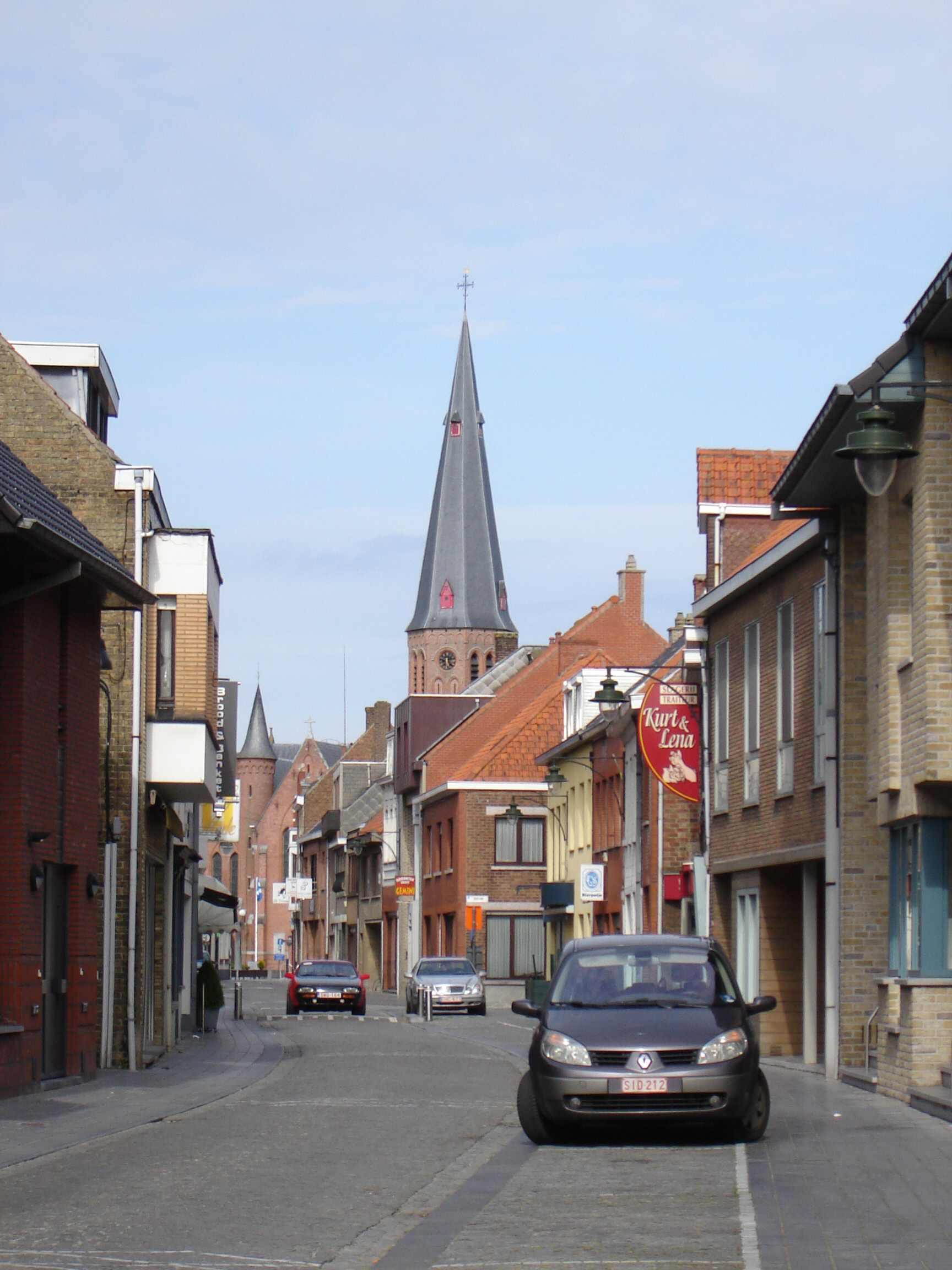
- Dorpsstraat in Koekelare with Saint Martinus Church

- Flag Coat of arms

- Location of Koekelare in West Flanders
- Interactive map of Koekelare
- Location in Belgium
- Coordinates: 51°05′N 02°58′E
- Country: Belgium
- Community: Flemish Community
- Region: Flemish Region
- Province: West Flanders
- Arrondissement: Diksmuide

Government
  - Mayor: Patrick Lansens (Vooruit)
  - Governing parties: Vooruit, N-VA

Area
  - Total: 39.44 km^{2} (15.23 sq mi)

Population (2018-01-01)
  - Total: 8,784
  - Density: 222.7/km^{2} (576.8/sq mi)
- Postal codes: 8680
- NIS code: 32010
- Area codes: 051
- Website: www.koekelare.be

Koekelare (Dutch: [ˈkukəˌlaːrə]; West Flemish: Kookloare) is a municipality located in the Belgian province of West Flanders. The municipality comprises the towns of Bovekerke, Koekelare proper and Zande. On 1 January 2006 Koekelare had a total population of 8,291. The total area is 39.19 km² which gives a population density of 212 inhabitants per km².

Koekelare was formerly written as Couckelaere.

== Towns ==
The municipality comprises Koekelare proper, but also contains the villages Bovekerke, Zande and De Mokker. Bovekerke and Zande are "deelgemeentes", which were independent municipalities until the 70s; De Mokker is part of Koekelare proper.

#	Name	Population (1999)
I (IV)	Koekelare: Koekelare; De Mokker	6.879
II	Bovekerke	1.000
III	Zande	302

Source :Streekplatform Westhoek. Socio-economische beleidsvisie & hefboomprojecten voor de Westhoek

Koekelare borders the following villages:

- a. Handzame (more specifically Edewalle) (Kortemark)
- b. Werken (Kortemark)
- c. Vladslo (Diksmuide)
- d. Leke (Diksmuide)
- e. Sint-Pieters-Kapelle (Middelkerke)
- f. Zevekote (Gistel)
- g. Moere (Gistel)
- h. Eernegem (Ichtegem)
- i. Ichtegem (Ichtegem)

Koekelare, towns and neighbouring towns. The yellow areas are urban areas.

== Sights ==
=== Museums ===
- Lange Max Museum, located on Site Lange Max (World War I)
- Käthe Kollwitz Museum (World War I)
- Fransmansmuseum

=== Buildings, monuments and structures ===
- Hovaeremolen, a windmill used as German observation post during World War I.
- Batterie Pommern
