= Sven Gatz =

Belgian politician

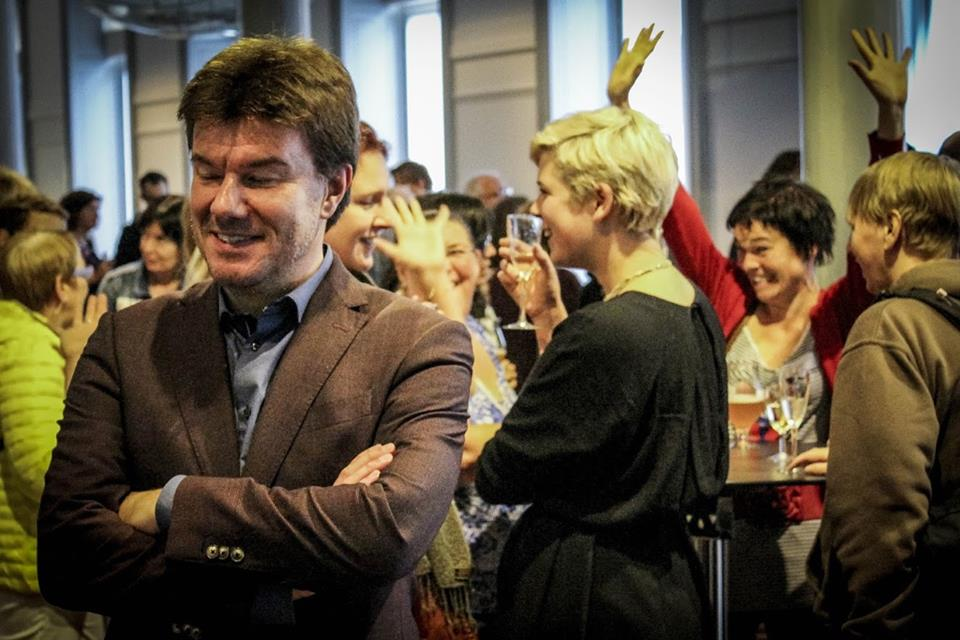
Sven Gatz

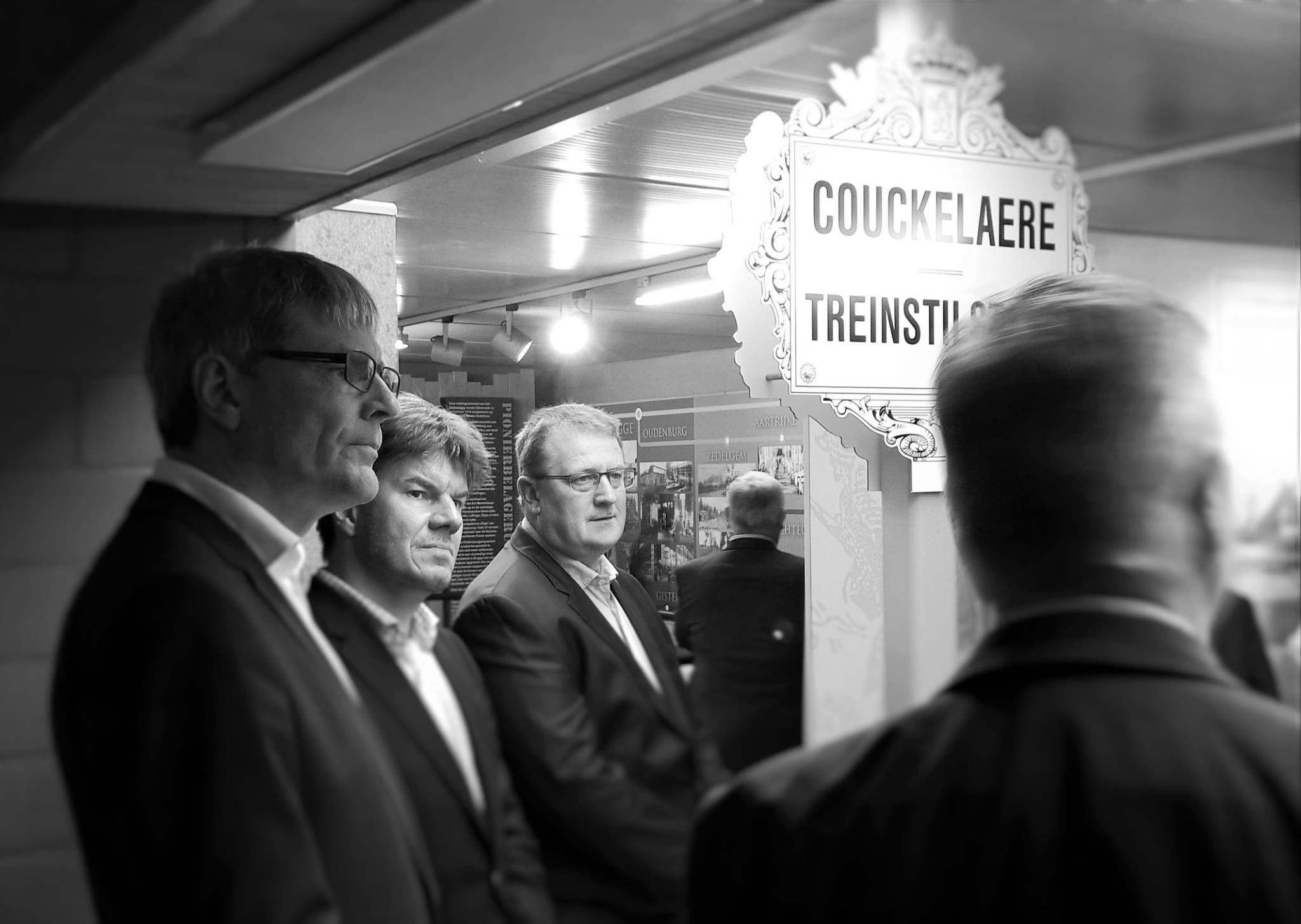
Flemish Minister for Culture Sven Gatz visiting the Lange Max Museum (June 2016)

Sven Gatz (born 6 May 1967 in Sint-Agatha-Berchem) is a Belgian politician for Anders (formerly Open Flemish Liberals and Democrats) who served as the Brussels Minister of Finance, Budget, Civil Service and Multilingualism in the government of the Brussels-Capital Region from 2019 to 2025.

From 1999 to 2011 he was member of the Flemish Parliament and from 2007 to 2011 he was leader of the Open Vld group there. He started as member of the Volksunie and switched to Open Vld when Volksunie was split. From 2000 to 2012 he was also member of the municipal council of Jette. In the 2012 local elections, he was not re-elected.

In 2011, he left politics to become director of the Belgian Brewers.

In July 2014, he returned to politics when he became Flemish Minister for Culture, Youth, Media and Brussels in the Bourgeois Government as Open Vld had to provide the required minister living in Brussels.

As Minister for Culture, his term of office has been marked by a decree that also makes libraries a municipal matter, no longer a Flemish one, and absolves the municipalities of their obligation to organise a local public library. This government decision was controversial and caused community leaders to speak out against it.
