= Bovekerke =

- Deelgemeente
- Coordinates: 51°03′13″N 2°57′49″E
- Country: Belgium
- Province: West Flanders
- Municipality: Koekelare

Area
  - Total: 5.40 km^{2} (2.08 sq mi)

Population (1999)
  - Total: 1,000
  - Density: 185/km^{2} (480/sq mi)
- Source: NIS
- Postal code: 8680

Bovekerke is a village in the Belgian province of West Flanders, and since 1971 it is a “deelgemeente” of the municipality of Koekelare. Besides the chief town of Koekelare proper, Bovekerke also borders the villages Vladslo (part of Diksmuide) and Werken (part of Kortemark).

Bovekerke has about 1,000 inhabitants. The Roman Catholic parish and church are named after Saint Gertrude. The Saint Gertrude church, with three naves, is built in brick in 1848. Only the octagonal church is left from the late roman church. This tower dates from the 12th century and might be the oldest building in Koekelare, and is a protected monument. During World War I, the tower was used as an observation tower, and the church was used as a hospital.
