= SMS Friedrich der Grosse (1911) =

Battleship of the German Imperial Navy

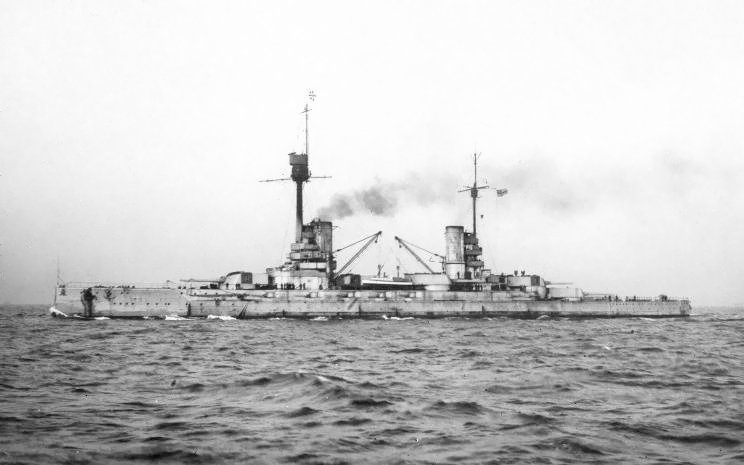
- SMS Friedrich der Grosse underway

History

German Empire
- Name: Friedrich der Grosse
- Namesake: King Frederick II of Prussia
- Builder: AG Vulcan, Hamburg
- Laid down: 26 January 1910
- Launched: 10 June 1911
- Commissioned: 15 October 1912
- Fate: Scuttled at Gutter Sound, Scapa Flow 21 June 1919
- Notes: Raised and broken up for scrapping 1936–1937

General characteristics
- Class & type: Kaiser-class battleship
- Displacement: Normal: 24,724 t (24,334 long tons); Full load: 27,000 t (27,000 long tons)
- Length: 172.40 m (565 ft 7 in)
- Beam: 29 m (95 ft 2 in)
- Draft: 9.10 m (29 ft 10 in)
- Installed power: 16 × water-tube boilers; 27,617 ihp (20,594 kW)
- Propulsion: 3 × steam turbines; 3 × screw propellers
- Speed: 22.4 knots (41.5 km/h; 25.8 mph)
- Range: 7,900 nmi (14,600 km; 9,100 mi) at 12 knots (22 km/h; 14 mph)
- Crew: 41 officers; 1,043 enlisted
- Armament: 10 × 30.5 cm (12 in) guns; 14 × 15 cm (5.9 in) guns; 12 × 8.8 cm (3.5 in) guns; 5 × 50 cm (19.7 in) torpedo tubes
- Armor: Belt 350 mm (13.8 in); Conning tower: 400 mm (15.7 in); Turrets: 300 mm (11.8 in)

SMS Friedrich der Grosse (Note: "SMS" stands for "Seiner Majestät Schiff" (German: His Majesty's Ship).) was the second vessel of the Kaiser class of dreadnought battleships of the German Imperial Navy. Friedrich der Grosse's (Note: Or Große in German, with a "sharp S"; see ß.) keel was laid on 26 January 1910 at the AG Vulcan dockyard in Hamburg, her hull was launched on 10 June 1911, and she was commissioned into the fleet on 15 October 1912. The ship was equipped with ten 30.5-centimeter (12 in) guns in five twin turrets, and had a top speed of 23.4 knots (43.3 km/h; 26.9 mph). Friedrich der Grosse was assigned to III Battle Squadron of the High Seas Fleet for the majority of World War I, and served as fleet flagship from her commissioning until 1917.

Along with her four sister ships, Kaiser, Kaiserin, König Albert, and Prinzregent Luitpold, Friedrich der Grosse participated in all the major fleet operations of World War I, including the Battle of Jutland on 31 May – 1 June 1916. Toward the center of the German line, Friedrich der Grosse was not as heavily engaged as the leading German ships, such as the battleships König and Grosser Kurfürst and the battlecruisers of I Scouting Group—Friedrich der Grosse emerged from the battle completely unscathed. In 1917, the new battleship Baden replaced Friedrich der Grosse as the fleet flagship.

After Germany's defeat in the war and the signing of the Armistice in November 1918, Friedrich der Grosse and most of the capital ships of the High Seas Fleet were interned by the British Royal Navy in Scapa Flow. The ships were disarmed and reduced to skeleton crews while the Allied powers negotiated the final version of the Treaty of Versailles. On 21 June 1919, days before the treaty was signed, the commander of the interned fleet, Rear Admiral Ludwig von Reuter, ordered the fleet to be scuttled to ensure that the British would not be able to seize the ships. Friedrich der Grosse was raised in 1936 and broken up for scrap metal. Her bell was returned to Germany in 1965 and is now located at the Fleet Headquarters in Glücksburg.

== Design ==
The German 1909 construction program included the last two members of the Helgoland-class battleships, along with two additional dreadnoughts to be built to a new design. The primary change was intended to be the adoption of steam turbines in favor of triple-expansion steam engines used in the earlier vessels. The space savings of turbines permitted a more efficient superfiring arrangement of the main battery, along the same model as the Moltke-class battlecruisers. The new ships' armor layout was significant improved over earlier designs; the Kaiser class was also far superior in defensive characteristics to their British counterparts of the King George V and Iron Duke classes, even if markedly inferior in terms of firepower.

=== Characteristics ===
Plan and profile drawing of the Kaiser class

Friedrich der Grosse was 172.4 m (565 ft 7 in) long overall and displaced a maximum of 27,000 metric tons (26,570 long tons) at full load. The ship had a beam of 29 m (95 ft 2 in) and a draft of 9.1 m (29 ft 10 in) forward and 8.80 m (28 ft 10 in) aft. The ship had an inverted bow and a long forecastle deck that extended for two-thirds the length of the hull. Her superstructure was fairly minimal, consisting primarily of a short, armored conning tower forward and a smaller, secondary conning tower aft. Friedrich der Grosse was fitted with a pair of pole masts for observation and signaling purposes. She had a crew of 41 officers and 1,043 enlisted men.

She was powered by three sets of AEG Curtis turbines, which drove three screw propellers. The turbines were supplied with steam by sixteen coal-fired water-tube boilers that were vented through a pair of widely spaced funnels. On trials, the powerplant produced a top speed of 22.4 knots (41.5 km/h; 25.8 mph). She carried 3,600 metric tons (3,500 long tons) of coal, which enabled a maximum range of 7,900 nautical miles (14,600 km; 9,100 mi) at a cruising speed of 12 knots (22 km/h; 14 mph).

The ship was armed with a main battery of ten 30.5 cm SK L/50 guns in five twin turrets. (Note: In Imperial German Navy gun nomenclature, "SK" (Schnelladekanone) denotes that the gun is quick loading, while the L/50 denotes the length of the gun. In this case, the L/50 gun is 50 calibers, meaning that the gun is 45 times as long as it is in bore diameter.) She disposed with the inefficient hexagonal turret arrangement of previous German battleships; instead, three of the five turrets were mounted on the centerline, with two of them arranged in a superfiring pair aft. The other two turrets were placed en echelon amidships, such that both could fire on the broadside. The ship was also armed with a secondary battery of fourteen 15 cm (5.9 in) SK L/45 guns in casemates amidships. For close-range defense against torpedo boats, she carried eight 8.8 cm (3.5 in) SK L/45 guns in casemates. The ship was also armed with four 8.8 cm L/45 anti-aircraft guns. Her armament was rounded out by five 50 cm (19.7 in) torpedo tubes, all mounted in the ship's hull; one was in the bow, and the other four were on the broadside.

Her main armored belt was 350 mm (13.8 in) thick in the central citadel, and was composed of Krupp cemented armor (KCA). Her main battery gun turrets were protected by 300 mm (11.8 in) of KCA on the sides and faces. Friedrich der Grosse's conning tower was heavily armored, with 400 mm (15.7 in) sides. As with the other four ships in her class, Friedrich der Grosse carried anti-torpedo nets until after the Battle of Jutland in 1916.

== Service history ==
Friedrich der Grosse at sea in 1913

Ordered under the contract name Ersatz Heimdall as a replacement for the obsolete coastal defense ship Heimdall, (Note: German warships were ordered under provisional names. Additions to the fleet were given a single letter; ships intended to replace older or lost vessels were ordered as "Ersatz (name of the ship to be replaced)".) Friedrich der Grosse was laid down at the AG Vulcan dockyard in Hamburg on 26 January 1910. She was launched on 10 June 1911, after which AG Vulcan conducted builder's trials. At her launching ceremony, Princess Alexandra Victoria performed the christening and Field Marshal Colmar Freiherr von der Goltz gave a speech. She was then transferred to Wilhelmshaven and commissioned into the fleet on 15 October 1912. Exercises in the Baltic Sea followed; Friedrich der Grosse then went to Kiel for final fitting-out work. On 22 January 1913, the ship was finally ready for active service.

After her commissioning in January 1913, Friedrich der Grosse conducted sea trials before becoming the fleet flagship on 2 March, replacing Deutschland. The ship participated in her first round of fleet maneuvers in February 1913, which were conducted in the Kattegat and the North Sea. The next month saw another round of exercises, from 12 to 14 March. The ship went into dock for periodic maintenance in April, and was ready for artillery training by the end of the month. Extensive fleet maneuvers were conducted in the North Sea from 5 to 27 May. Friedrich der Grosse, as the Navy's newest battleship, was sent to Kiel for Kiel Week in June. While there, she was visited by the Italian king Victor Emmanuel III and his wife Elena. In mid-July, the fleet conducted its annual summer cruise to Norway, which lasted until mid-August. During the cruise, Friedrich der Grosse visited Balholmen, Norway. The autumn maneuvers followed after the fleet returned; they lasted from 31 August to 9 September. Unit drills and individual ship training were conducted in October and November.

In early 1914, Friedrich der Grosse participated in additional ship and unit training. The annual spring maneuvers were conducted in the North Sea at the end of March. Further fleet exercises followed in April and May in the Baltic and North Seas. The ship again went to Kiel Week that year. Despite the rising international tensions following the assassination of Archduke Franz Ferdinand on 28 June, the High Seas Fleet began its summer cruise to Norway on 13 July. During the last peacetime cruise of the Imperial Navy, the fleet conducted drills off Skagen before proceeding to the Norwegian fjords on 25 July. The following day the fleet began to steam back to Germany, as a result of Austria-Hungary's ultimatum to Serbia. On the 27th, the entire fleet assembled off Cape Skudenes before returning to port, where they remained at a heightened state of readiness. War between Austria-Hungary and Serbia broke out the following day, and in the span of a week all of the major European powers had joined the conflict.

=== World War I ===
The High Seas Fleet, including Friedrich der Grosse, conducted a number of sweeps and advances into the North Sea. The first occurred on 2–3 November 1914, though no British forces were encountered. Admiral Friedrich von Ingenohl, the commander of the High Seas Fleet, adopted a strategy in which the battlecruisers of Konteradmiral (KAdm—Rear Admiral) Franz von Hipper's I Scouting Group raided British coastal towns to lure out portions of the Grand Fleet where they could be destroyed by the High Seas Fleet. The raid on Scarborough, Hartlepool and Whitby on 15–16 December 1914 was the first such operation. On the evening of 15 December, the German battle fleet of some twelve dreadnoughts—including Friedrich der Grosse and her four sisters—and eight pre-dreadnoughts came to within 10 nmi (19 km; 12 mi) of an isolated squadron of six British battleships. Skirmishes between the rival destroyer screens in the darkness convinced Ingenohl that he was faced with the entire Grand Fleet. Under orders from Kaiser Wilhelm II to avoid risking the fleet unnecessarily, Ingenohl broke off the engagement and turned the battle fleet back toward Germany.

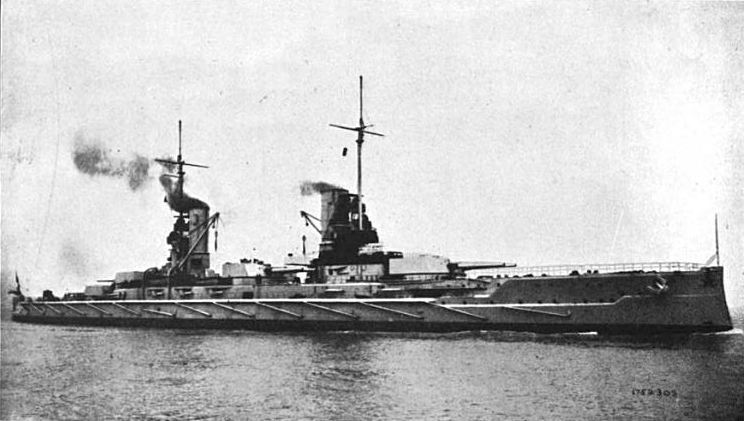
Friedrich der Grosse sometime before 1917

Following the loss of SMS Blücher at the Battle of Dogger Bank in January 1915, the Kaiser removed Ingenohl from his post on 2 February. Admiral Hugo von Pohl replaced him as commander of the fleet. Pohl conducted a series of fleet advances in 1915 in which Friedrich der Grosse took part; in the first one on 29–30 March, the fleet steamed out to the north of Terschelling and return without incident. Another followed on 17–18 April, where Friedrich der Grosse and the rest of the fleet covered a mining operation by II Scouting Group. Three days later, on 21–22 April, the High Seas Fleet advanced toward Dogger Bank, though again failed to meet any British forces.

II Scouting Group performed another minelaying operation on 17–18 May, and Friedrich der Grosse and the rest of the fleet steamed out in support. Less than two weeks later on 29–30 May, the fleet attempted to conduct a sweep in the North Sea, but inclement weather forced Pohl to cancel the operation some 50 nmi (93 km; 58 mi) off Schiermonnikoog. The fleet remained in port until 10 August, when it sortied to Helgoland to cover the return of the auxiliary cruiser Möwe. A month later, on 11–12 September, the fleet covered another mine-laying operation off the Swarte Bank. The last operation of the year, conducted on 23–24 October, was an advance without result in the direction of Horns Reef.

On 11 January 1916, Vizeadmiral (VAdm—Vice Admiral) Reinhard Scheer replaced Pohl, who was suffering from liver cancer. A week later on the 18th, Scheer hoisted his flag aboard Friedrich der Grosse. Scheer proposed a more aggressive policy designed to force a confrontation with the British Grand Fleet; he received approval from the Kaiser in February. The first of Scheer's operations was conducted the following month, on 5–7 March, with an uneventful sweep of the Hoofden. On 25–26 March, Scheer attempted to attack British forces that had raided Tondern, but failed to locate them. Another advance to Horns Reef followed on 21–22 April.

On 24 April, the battlecruisers of Hipper's I Scouting Group conducted a raid on the English coast. Friedrich der Grosse and the rest of the fleet sailed in distant support. The battlecruiser Seydlitz struck a mine while en route to the target, and had to withdraw. The other battlecruisers bombarded the town of Lowestoft unopposed but, during the approach to Yarmouth, they encountered the British cruisers of the Harwich Force. A short artillery duel ensued before the Harwich Force withdrew. Reports of British submarines in the area prompted the retreat of I Scouting Group. At this point, Scheer, who had been warned of the sortie of the Grand Fleet from its base in Scapa Flow, also withdrew to safer German waters.

==== Battle of Jutland ====
Maps showing the maneuvers of the British (blue) and German (red) fleets on 31 May – 1 June 1916

Soon after the Lowestoft raid, Scheer began planning another foray into the North Sea. He had initially intended to launch the operation in mid-May, by which time the mine damage to Seydlitz was scheduled to be repaired—Scheer was unwilling to embark on a major raid without his battlecruiser forces at full strength. On 9 May, several battleships developed problems with their engines, which delayed the operation further, to 23 May. By 22 May, Seydlitz was still not fully repaired and the operation was again postponed, to 29 May. At noon on 29 May, the repairs to Seydlitz were finally completed, and the ship returned to I Scouting Group. The plan called for Hipper's battlecruisers to steam north to the Skagerrak, with the intention of luring out a portion of the British fleet so it could be destroyed by Scheer's waiting battleships.

Friedrich der Grosse was the eighth ship in the German line; the four König-class ships of the V Division, III Battle Squadron, led the line, followed by four Kaiser-class ships in the VI Division, III Battle Squadron. Friedrich der Grosse was the last ship in her division, directly astern of Prinzregent Luitpold and ahead of Ostfriesland, the flagship of VAdm Ehrhard Schmidt's I Division, I Battle Squadron. The eight Helgoland- and Nassau-class battleships constituted I Squadron, which was followed by the six elderly pre-dreadnoughts of KAdm Franz Mauve's II Squadron. Hipper's five battlecruisers, the scouting force for the fleet, left the Jade estuary at 02:00 on 31 May; Scheer and the High Seas Fleet followed an hour and a half later.

Shortly before 16:00 the battlecruisers of I Scouting Group encountered the British 1st Battlecruiser Squadron under the command of Vice Admiral Sir David Beatty. The opposing ships began an artillery duel that saw the destruction of Indefatigable, shortly after 17:00, and Queen Mary, less than half an hour later. By this time, the German battlecruisers were steaming south to draw the British ships toward the main body of the High Seas Fleet. At 17:30, König's crew spotted both I Scouting Group and the 1st Battlecruiser Squadron approaching. The German battlecruisers were steaming to starboard, while the British ships steamed to port. At 17:45, Scheer ordered a two-point turn to port to bring his ships closer to the British battlecruisers and the accompanying fast battleships of the 5th Battle Squadron; a minute later, he gave the order to open fire. (Note: The compass can be divided into 32 points, each corresponding to 11.25 degrees. A two-point turn to port would alter the ships' course by 22.5 degrees.)

Friedrich der Grosse was still out of range of both the British battlecruisers and the 5th Battle Squadron, and so held her fire initially. Between 17:48 and 17:52, Friedrich der Grosse and ten other battleships engaged the 2nd Light Cruiser Squadron, though only Nassau managed to score a hit during this period. Shortly after, the German battle line came across the disabled destroyers Nestor and Nomad. Friedrich der Grosse and her three sisters targeted Nomad and quickly sank her. Nestor was similarly dispatched by the I Squadron ships. Shortly after 19:00, a melee between the German line and British cruisers took place. The center of the action was the damaged German cruiser Wiesbaden, which had been disabled by a shell from the British battlecruiser Invincible. KAdm Paul Behncke in König attempted to maneuver III Squadron to cover the stricken cruiser. Simultaneously, the British 3rd and 4th Light Cruiser Squadrons began a torpedo attack on the German line; while advancing to torpedo range, they smothered Wiesbaden with fire from their main guns. The eight III Squadron battleships fired on the British cruisers, but even the sustained fire from the battleships' main guns failed to drive off the British cruisers. The armored cruisers Defence, Warrior, and Black Prince joined in the attack on the crippled Wiesbaden. While most of the III Squadron battleships rained heavy fire upon the attacking armored cruisers, Friedrich der Grosse and the I Squadron ships engaged the battleship Warspite at ranges from 9,600 to 12,500 yd (8,800 to 11,400 m), until Warspite disappeared in the haze. In this period, Warspite was hit by 13 heavy shells, though the ships that fired them are unknown.

After successfully withdrawing from the British, Scheer ordered the fleet to assume night cruising formation, though communication errors between Scheer aboard Friedrich der Grosse and Westfalen, the lead ship, caused delays. The series of reversals in course and confused maneuvers disorganized the fleet and inverted the sequence of ships, but by 23:30 the fleet had reached its cruising formation. Friedrich der Grosse was now the ninth ship in a line of twenty-four, headed by the eight I Squadron ships. Shortly after 01:00, the British cruiser Black Prince stumbled into the German line. Searchlights aboard Thüringen illuminated the target; Friedrich der Grosse, Thüringen, Nassau, and Ostfriesland hammered the cruiser at point-blank range with main and secondary guns. In the span of a few minutes Black Prince exploded and sank, taking her entire crew of 857 with her.

After a series of night engagements between the I Squadron battleships and British destroyers, the High Seas Fleet punched through the British light forces and reached Horns Reef by 04:00 on 1 June. The German fleet reached Wilhelmshaven a few hours later; five of the I Squadron battleships took up defensive positions in the outer roadstead, and Kaiser, Kaiserin, Prinzregent Luitpold, and Kronprinz stood ready just outside the entrance to Wilhelmshaven. The rest of the fleet entered Wilhelmshaven, where Friedrich der Grosse and the other ships still in fighting condition replenished their stocks of coal and ammunition. In the course of the battle, Friedrich der Grosse had fired 72 main battery shells and 151 rounds from her secondary guns. She emerged from the battle completely undamaged.

==== Subsequent North Sea operations ====
On 18 August 1916, Friedrich der Grosse took part in an operation to bombard Sunderland. Scheer attempted a repeat of the original 31 May plan: the two serviceable German battlecruisers, Moltke and Von der Tann, augmented by three faster dreadnoughts, were to bombard the coastal town of Sunderland in an attempt to draw out and destroy Beatty's battlecruisers. Scheer, in Friedrich der Grosse, would trail behind with the rest of the fleet and provide support. During the action of 19 August 1916, Scheer turned north after receiving a false report from a zeppelin about a British unit in the area. As a result, the bombardment was not carried out, and by 14:35, Scheer had been warned of the Grand Fleet's approach and so turned his forces around and retreated to German ports.

The fleet advanced as far as the Dogger Bank on 19–20 October. The operation led to a brief action on 19 October, during which a British submarine torpedoed the cruiser München. The failure of the operation (coupled with the action of 19 August) convinced the German naval command to abandon its aggressive fleet strategy in favor of a resumption of the unrestricted submarine warfare campaign.

The fleet was reorganized on 1 December; the four König-class battleships remained in III Squadron, along with the newly commissioned Bayern, while the five Kaiser-class ships, including Friedrich der Grosse, were transferred to IV Squadron. In March 1917 the new battleship Baden, built to serve as fleet flagship, entered service; on the 17th, Scheer hauled down his flag from Friedrich der Grosse and transferred it to Baden. On 4–5 July, crewmen aboard Friedrich der Grosse staged a hunger strike in protest over the poor quality and insufficient quantity of the food they were given. The ship's officers relented, fed the crew a meal of groat soup and agreed to form a Menagekommission, a council that gave the enlisted men a voice in their ration selection and preparation. Further insubordination on several vessels followed on 11 July, and the ringleaders were arrested and put on trial. Max Reichpietsch, a stoker from Friedrich der Grosse was sentenced to death and executed by firing squad on 5 September in Cologne.

==== Operation Albion ====
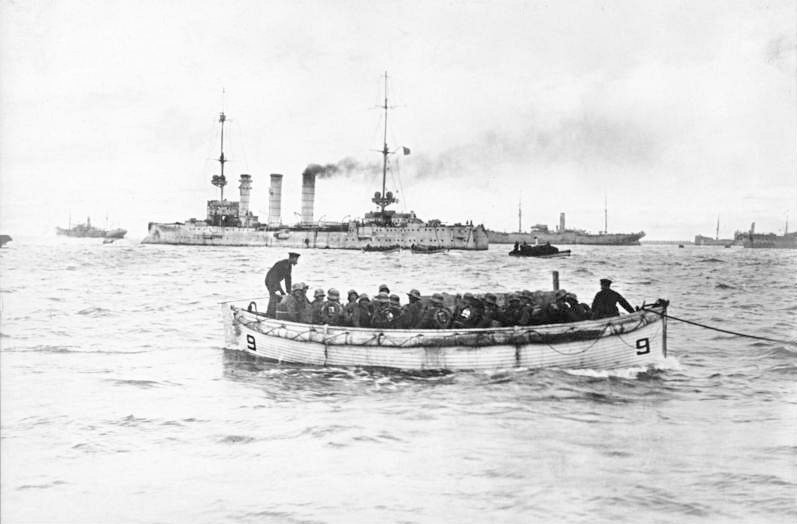
German troops landing at Ösel

In early September 1917, following the German conquest of the Russian port of Riga, the German navy decided to eliminate the Russian naval forces that still held the Gulf of Riga. The Admiralstab (Navy High Command) planned an operation to seize the Baltic island of Ösel, and specifically the Russian gun batteries on the Sworbe Peninsula. The Admiralstab issued orders on 18 September for a joint operation with the army to capture Ösel and Moon Islands; the primary naval component was to comprise the flagship, Moltke, and III and IV Battle Squadrons of the High Seas Fleet. Along with nine light cruisers, three torpedo boat flotillas, and dozens of mine warfare ships, the entire force numbered some 300 ships, supported by over 100 aircraft and six zeppelins. The invasion force amounted to approximately 24,600 officers and enlisted men. Opposing the Germans were the old Russian pre-dreadnoughts Slava and Tsesarevich, the armored cruisers Bayan, Admiral Makarov, and Diana, 26 destroyers, and several torpedo boats and gunboats. The garrison on Ösel numbered some 14,000 men.

The operation began on the morning of 12 October, when Moltke and the III Squadron ships engaged Russian positions in Tagga Bay while Friedrich der Grosse and the rest of IV Squadron shelled Russian gun batteries on the Sworbe Peninsula on Ösel. The coastal artillery in both locations were quickly silenced by the battleships' heavy guns. On the morning of the 14th, Friedrich der Grosse, Kaiserin, and König Albert were detached to support German troops advancing toward Anseküll. The three ships fired on the battery at Zerel for an hour, which prompted most of the Russian gun crews to flee their posts.

By 20 October, the fighting on the islands was winding down; Moon, Ösel, and Dagö were in German possession. The previous day, the Admiralstab had ordered the cessation of naval actions and the return of the dreadnoughts to the High Seas Fleet as soon as possible. On 27 October, Friedrich der Grosse was detached from the Baltic and returned to the North Sea. Upon her return, she resumed guard duties.

==== Final operations ====
In late 1917, light forces of the High Seas Fleet began interdicting British convoys to Norway, which prompted the British to detach battleships from the battle fleet to protect the convoys. The Germans were now presented with an opportunity for which they had been waiting the entire war: a portion of the Grand Fleet could be isolated and destroyed. Hipper planned the operation: the battlecruisers of I Scouting Group, along with light cruisers and destroyers, would attack one of the large convoys, while the rest of the High Seas Fleet would stand by, ready to attack the British battleship squadron. At 05:00 on 23 April 1918, Friedrich der Grosse and the rest of the fleet departed from the Schillig roadstead. Hipper ordered wireless transmissions be kept to a minimum, to prevent radio intercepts by British intelligence. At 06:10 the German battlecruisers had reached a position approximately 60 kilometers (37 mi) southwest of Bergen when Moltke lost her inner starboard propeller, which severely damaged the ship's engines. Despite this setback, Hipper continued northward. By 14:00, Hipper's force had crossed the convoy route several times but had found nothing. At 14:10, Hipper turned his ships southward. By 18:37, the German fleet had made it back to the defensive minefields surrounding their bases. It was later discovered that the convoy had left port a day later than expected by the German planning staff. Afterward, she went into drydock for extensive maintenance, which lasted from 26 July to 28 September.

Friedrich der Grosse and her four sisters were to have taken part in a final fleet action at the end of October 1918, days before the Armistice was to take effect. The bulk of the High Seas Fleet was to have sortied from their base in Wilhelmshaven to engage the British Grand Fleet; Scheer—by now the Grossadmiral (Grand Admiral) of the fleet—intended to inflict as much damage as possible on the British navy, to ensure a better bargaining position for Germany, despite the expected casualties. However, many of the war-weary sailors felt the operation would disrupt the peace process and prolong the war. On the morning of 29 October 1918, the order was given to sail from Wilhelmshaven the following day. Starting on the night of 29 October, sailors on Thüringen and then on several other battleships mutinied. On the 30th, crewmen aboard Friedrich der Grosse engaged in forms of passive resistance, including a "go-slow" while replenishing the ship's coal stock. (Note: The crewmen intentionally worked slowly as a form of passive resistance.) The unrest ultimately forced Hipper and Scheer to cancel the operation. Informed of the situation, the Kaiser stated "I no longer have a navy."

=== Fate ===
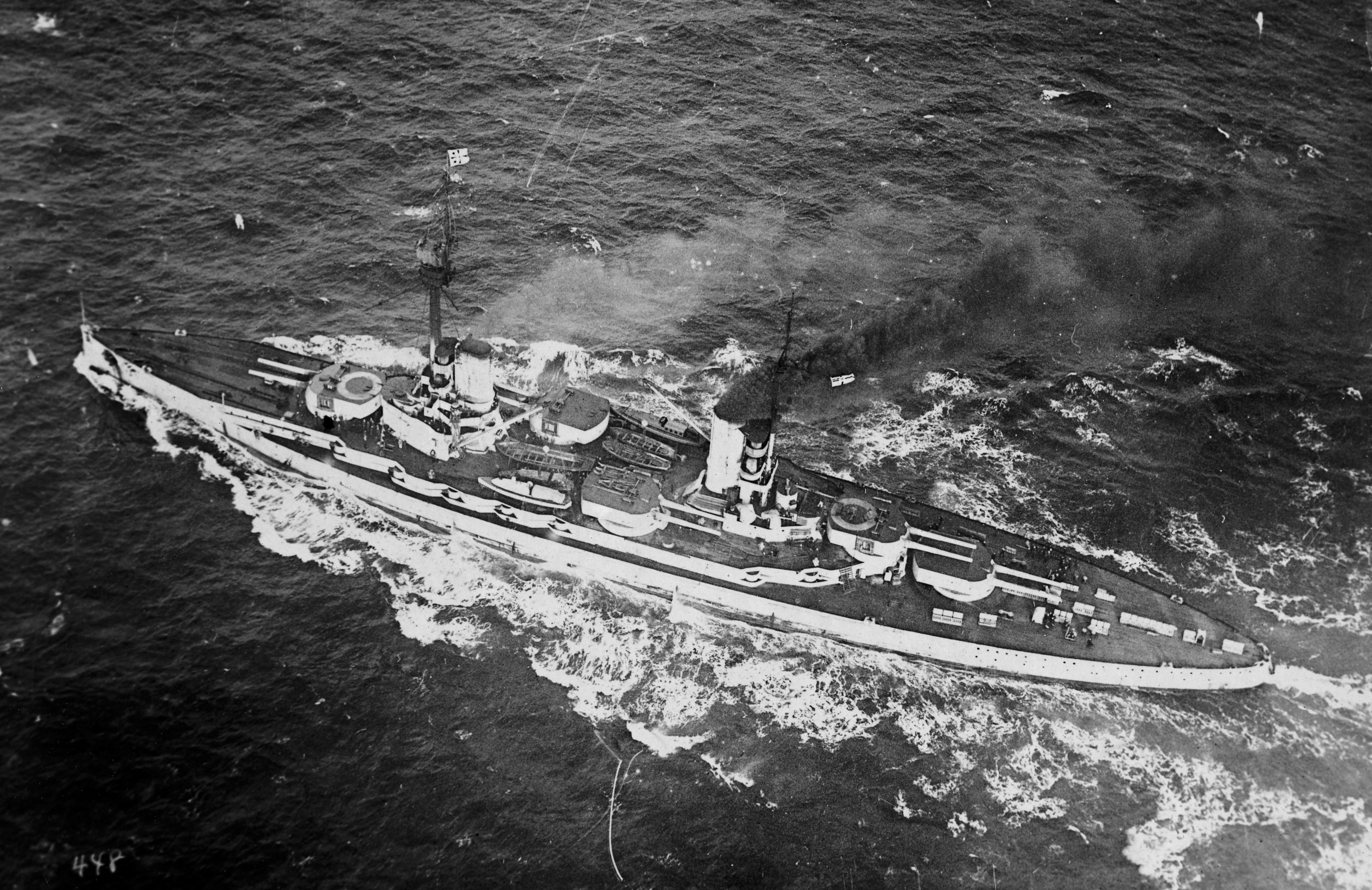
Friedrich der Grosse steaming to Scapa Flow for internment

Map of the scuttled ships showing Friedrich der Grosse (#2); click for a larger view

In early November 1918, Germany agreed to surrender according to terms laid out in the Armistice of 11 November 1918; one of the clauses of the agreement stipulated that the bulk of the High Seas Fleet must be interned while negotiations for the eventual peace treaty were held. After proposals to send the fleet to Norway or Spain failed, the Allies settled on the British naval base at Scapa Flow. Friedrich der Grosse was among the list of ships to be interned. The fleet was commanded by KAdm Ludwig von Reuter. Prior to the departure of the German fleet, Admiral Adolf von Trotha made clear to Reuter that he could not allow the Allies to seize the ships under any conditions.

On 21 November, the fleet rendezvoused with the British light cruiser Cardiff, which led the ships to the Allied fleet that was to escort the Germans to Scapa Flow. The Allied fleet consisted of some 370 British, American, and French warships. The Germans initially sailed to the Firth of Forth, and from there, proceeded in smaller groups to Scapa Flow. Once the ships were interned, their guns were disabled through the removal of their breech blocks, and their crews were reduced to 200 officers and enlisted men. The fleet remained in captivity during the negotiations that ultimately produced the Versailles Treaty.

The fleet remained in captivity during the negotiations that ultimately produced the Treaty of Versailles. Reuter believed that the British intended to seize the German ships on 21 June 1919, which was the deadline for Germany to sign the peace treaty. Unaware that the deadline had been extended to the 23rd, Reuter ordered the ships to be sunk at the next opportunity. On the morning of 21 June, the British fleet left Scapa Flow to conduct training maneuvers, and at 11:20 Reuter transmitted the order to his ships. Friedrich der Grosse capsized and sank at 12:16.

Friedrich der Grosse remained on the bottom of Scapa Flow for some fifteen years before being sold to Metal Industries, Limited on 27 June 1934. They raised the wreck on 29 April 1937 and towed her to Rosyth, Britain, on 5 August that year. Ship breaking began on 25 August and was completed on 18 May 1938. On 30 August 1965, Britain returned the ship's bell to Germany via the frigate Scheer; it now resides at the Fleet Headquarters of the German Navy in Glücksburg.
