= Russian battleship Slava =

Borodino-class pre-dreadnought

Coordinates: 58°40′43″N 23°21′19″E

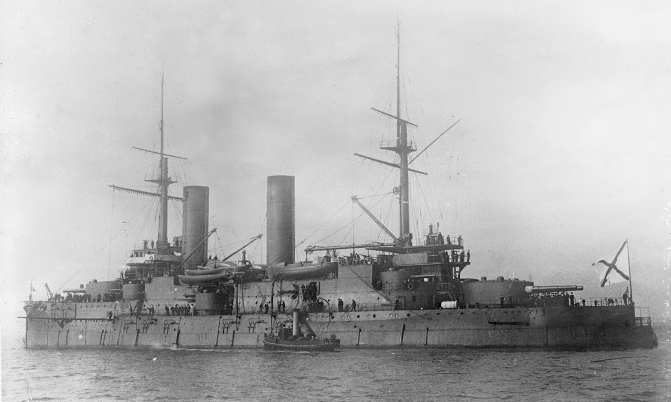
- Slava

History

Russian Empire
- Name: Slava
- Operator: Imperial Russian Navy
- Ordered: 30 January 1900 (Note: All dates used in this article are New Style)
- Builder: Baltic Shipyard, Saint Petersburg
- Laid down: 1 November 1902
- Launched: 29 August 1903
- Commissioned: October 1905
- Stricken: 29 May 1918
- Fate: Scuttled near the island of Muhu during the Battle of Moon Sound, 17 October 1917

General characteristics
- Class & type: Borodino-class pre-dreadnought battleship
- Displacement: 14,415 long tons (14,646 t) (normal); 15,275 long tons (15,520 t) full load
- Length: 397 ft 3 in (121.1 m)
- Beam: 76 ft 1 in (23.2 m)
- Draft: 29 ft 2 in (8.9 m)
- Installed power: 15,800 ihp (11,800 kW); 20 water-tube boilers
- Propulsion: 2 shafts, 2 vertical triple-expansion steam engines
- Speed: 17.5 knots (32.4 km/h; 20.1 mph)
- Range: 2,590 nmi (4,800 km; 2,980 mi) at 10 knots (19 km/h; 12 mph)
- Complement: 846
- Armament: 2 × twin 12-inch (305 mm) guns; 6 × twin 6-inch (152 mm) guns; 20 × single 75-millimeter (3.0 in) guns; 4 × single 47-millimeter (1.9 in) saluting guns; 4 × 15-inch (381 mm) torpedo tubes
- Armor: Krupp armor; Waterline belt: 145–194 mm (5.7–7.6 in); Deck: 25.4–51 mm (1–2 in); Turrets: 254 mm (10.0 in); Barbettes: 178–229 mm (7–9 in); Conning tower: 203 mm (8.0 in)

Slava (Russian: Слава "Glory") was a pre-dreadnought battleship of the Imperial Russian Navy, the last of the five Borodino-class battleships. Completed too late to participate in the Battle of Tsushima during the Russo-Japanese War, she survived while all of her sister ships were either sunk during the battle or surrendered to the Imperial Japanese Navy.

Serving in the Baltic Sea during World War I, Slava was the largest ship of the Russian Gulf of Riga Squadron that fought the German High Seas Fleet in the Battle of the Gulf of Riga in August 1915. She repeatedly bombarded German positions and troops for the rest of 1915 and during 1916. During the Battle of Moon Sound in 1917, Slava was badly damaged by the German dreadnought SMS König, significantly increasing her draft. The shallow channel made it impossible to escape and she was scuttled in the Moon Sound Strait between the island of Muhu (Moon) and the mainland. The Estonians scrapped her during the 1930s.

== Description ==
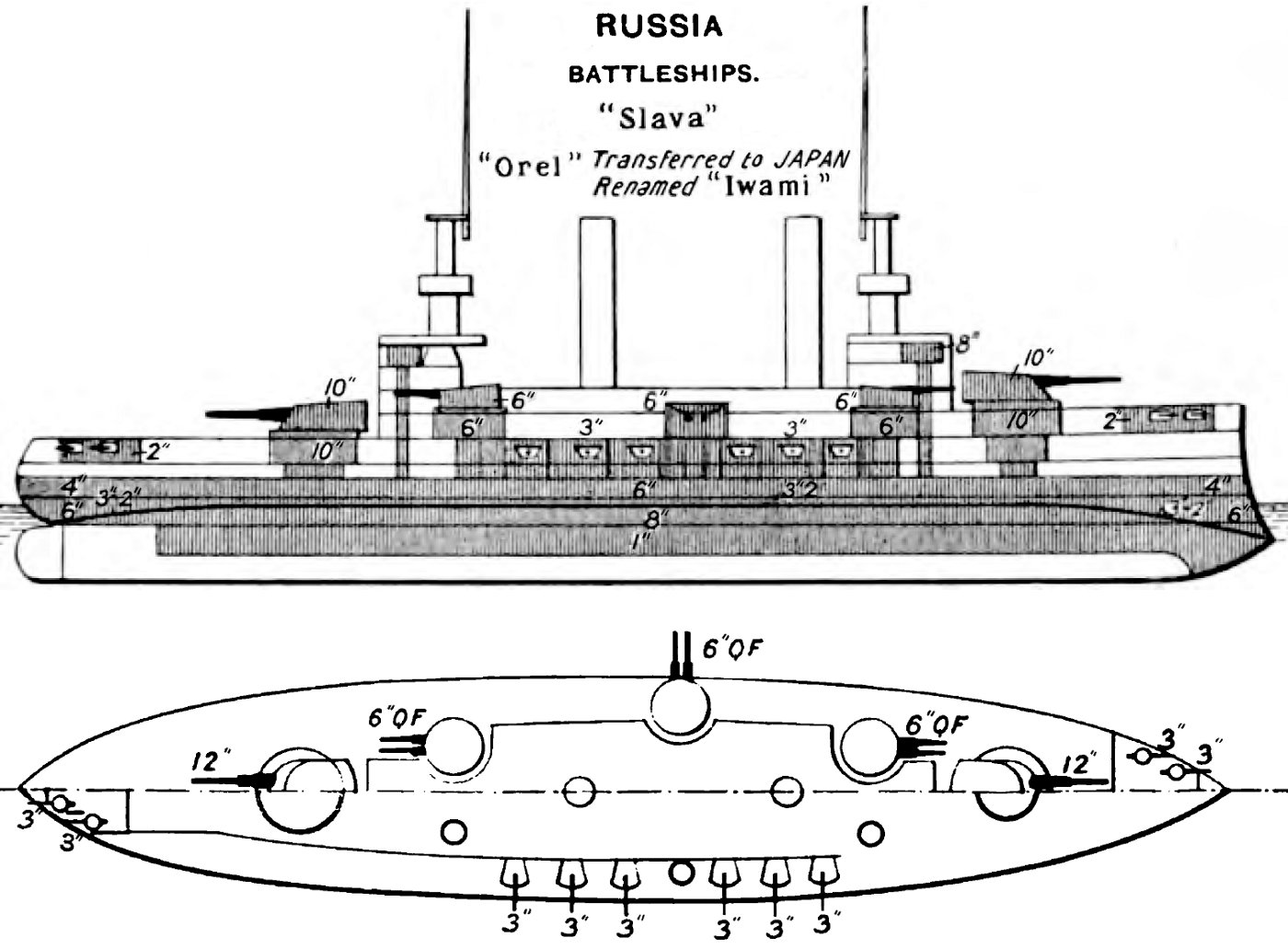
Right elevation and deck plan as depicted in Brassey's Naval Annual 1906

Slava was 389 feet 5 inches (118.69 m) long at the waterline and 397 feet 3 inches (121.1 m) long overall, with a beam of 76 feet 1 inch (23.2 m) and a draft of 29 feet 2 inches (8.9 m), 38 inches (965 mm) more than designed. Her normal displacement was 14,415 long tons (14,646 t), almost 900 long tons (914 t) more than her designed displacement of 13,516 long tons (13,733 t).

The ship was powered by two 4-cylinder vertical triple expansion steam engines, each driving one 4-bladed propeller, with twenty Belleville water-tube boilers providing steam to the engines at a pressure of 21 standard atmospheres (2,128 kPa; 309 psi). The engines and boilers were both built by the Baltic Works. The engines had a total designed output of 15,800 indicated horsepower (11,782 kW), but they produced 16,378 ihp (12,213 kW) on trials and gave a top speed of 17.64 knots (32.67 km/h; 20.30 mph). At full load she carried 1,350 long tons (1,372 t) of coal that provided her a range of 2,590 nautical miles (4,800 km; 2,980 mi) at a speed of 10 knots (19 km/h; 12 mph). She had four steam-driven dynamos, each with a capacity of 150 kW, and two auxiliary generators with a capacity of 64 kW each.

Slava's 40-caliber 12-inch guns were mounted in two twin-gun turrets, one each fore and aft. They had a rate of fire of about one round per minute. Sixty rounds per gun were carried. The twelve 45-caliber 6-inch (152 mm) guns were mounted in six electrically powered twin-gun turrets carried on the sides of the ship. They had a practical rate of fire of about three rounds per minute and were provided with 180 rounds per gun. Four of the twenty 75-millimeter (3.0 in) guns used against torpedo boats were mounted in casemates just below the forward main gun turret, two on each side. These guns were placed well above the waterline for use in any weather, unlike the remaining sixteen guns, which were mounted in casemates one deck lower and distributed over the length of the ship, close to the water. This was graphically demonstrated when Slava's sister ship Imperator Aleksandr III made a high-speed turn during her trials, heeling 15°, and began taking water through the lower casemates. Each gun had 300 rounds available. All but four of her 47-millimeter (1.9 in) Hotchkiss guns were removed before she was completed and the remaining guns were used as saluting guns. She carried four 15-inch (381 mm) torpedo tubes, one above water in the bow and one in the stern with two torpedoes each, and a submerged tube on each side forward with three torpedoes each. Two of these were removed before 1914, although it is not known which ones were retained.

=== Wartime modifications ===
She was reportedly fitted with two 47 mm anti-aircraft (AA) guns during the war, but carried only four 3-inch (76 mm) AA guns in early 1917. Her light armament had been reduced to twelve 75 mm guns by that same date. While she was laid up over the winter of 1916 at Helsinki, the elevation of her main guns was increased to a maximum of 25° which increased their range to 23,000 yards (21,000 m).

== Service ==
Slava was built by the Baltic Works at Saint Petersburg. She was laid down on 1 November 1902, launched on 29 August 1903, and completed in October 1905, too late to participate in the Russo-Japanese War. Together with the battleship Tsesarevich, she helped to suppress the Sveaborg Rebellion in 1906. Slava was assigned to a training squadron for new officers fresh from the Naval College that was formed after the Rebellion as part of the post-Tsushima naval reforms. On one of her training cruises to the Mediterranean, her crewmen rescued survivors during the 1908 Messina earthquake and the ship took casualties to Naples for medical care. She had a serious boiler accident in August 1910 and was towed by Tsesarevich to Gibraltar for temporary repairs before sailing to Toulon for repairs that required nearly a year to complete. Upon her return to Kronstadt she was relieved of her training assignment and transferred to the Baltic Fleet.

The Baltic Fleet only had four pre-dreadnoughts in service, as the Second Brigade of Battleships, when World War I began, although the four dreadnoughts of the Gangut class were almost finished. After they were completed and could defend the mouth of the Gulf of Finland, Slava sailed through the Irbe Strait on 31 July 1915 to assist Russian forces defending the Gulf of Riga. More specifically she was to support the Imperial Russian Army with her guns and to defend the gulf against German naval forces.

=== Battle of the Gulf of Riga ===
Barely a week later, on 8 August, the Germans began to sweep the mines defending the Irbe Strait, and Slava, accompanied by the gunboats Khrabry and Groziashchii, sortied to fire on the minesweepers. The German pre-dreadnoughts Elsass and Braunschweig attempted to drive the Russians off, but Slava remained in position despite sustaining splinter damage from near misses. She did not open fire, as her captain did not want to reveal the fact that she was out-ranged by the German battleships. The Germans were not prepared for the number of mines laid by the Russians and withdrew to reconsider their plans.

They tried again on 16 August, this time with the dreadnoughts Nassau and Posen defending the minesweepers. Slava flooded her side compartments to give herself a 3° list which increased her maximum range to about 18,000 yards (16,459 m). She did not engage the German battleships, but only fired on the minesweepers and any German ships such as the armored cruiser Prinz Adalbert when they approached the other Russian ships. When the Germans returned the next day Slava was hit three times by 283-millimeter (11.1 in) shells in quick succession. The first hit penetrated her upper belt armor and exploded in a coal bunker; the second hit penetrated her upper deck, hit the supporting tube of the aft port side six-inch turret and started a fire in the ammunition hoist which caused the magazine to be flooded. The third shell passed through a pair of the ship's boats, but exploded in the water off to one side. These hits did not seriously damage Slava and she remained in place until ordered to retreat. The Germans entered the Gulf the next day, but they were forced to withdraw shortly afterward when the British submarine HMS E1 torpedoed the battlecruiser Moltke on 19 August and the Russian coastal artillery that still commanded the Irbe Strait made it very risky to enter the Gulf of Riga.

The German withdrawal allowed Slava, after repairs, to switch to her other task and support the army with gunfire. During one of these missions, as she was bombarding German positions near Tukums on 25 September 1915, she was hit in the conning tower while at anchor, killing her captain and five others. McLaughlin attributes the hit to German field artillery, but Nekrasov quotes German accounts that attribute it to a 10-kilogram (22 lb) bomb dropped by one of a pair of German seaplanes. Slava remained in position and resumed her bombardment. She continued to support the Army until the water in the Gulf of Riga threatened to freeze over at which time she retired to the port of Kuivastu to winter over. While still in port she was hit by three light bombs dropped by a seaplane on 12 April 1916; these did little material damage, but killed seven sailors. On 2 July she resumed her support of the army with a bombardment of advancing German troops despite sustaining one hit by an 8-inch (203 mm) shell on her waterline armor that caused no damage. She repeated these missions a number of times in July and August. These annoyed the Germans enough that they attempted to sink Slava with a coordinated ambush by the submarine UB-31 and low-flying torpedo bombers as she responded to a feint by German cruisers on 12 September, but all their torpedoes missed. This was the first attack by torpedo bombers against a moving battleship.

=== Battle of Moon Sound ===
Slava was held back during the initial stages of the German landings (Operation Albion) on Saaremaa (Oesel) Island guarding the mouth of the Gulf of Riga in October 1917 to defend Kassar Wiek (Inlet), which separates the outer islands of Saaremaa and Hiiumaa (Dagö). She intermittently fired at German torpedo boats as they fought Russian light forces in Kassar Wiek on 15 and 16 October, but scored no hits from her position near Kesselaid (Schildau) Island in Moon Sound Strait. On the morning of 17 October the Germans attempted to sweep the Russian mines placed at the southern entrance to Moon Sound Strait. Slava, the pre-dreadnought Grazhdanin and the armored cruiser Bayan were ordered south to meet them by Vice Admiral Mikhail Bakhirev, opening fire on the minesweepers at 8:05 a.m. (Note: Central European Time is used in this section) The dreadnoughts König and Kronprinz were to provide cover for the minesweepers, but Slava, sailing further south, opened fire on them at 8:12 at nearly her maximum range. Grazhdanin, whose turrets had not been modified for extra elevation, remained behind with Bayan and continued to engage the minesweepers. The German ships returned fire, but their shells fell short at a range of 20,400 meters (22,300 yd). Slava continued to fire on the Germans, but scored no hits, although some shells impacted only 50 meters (160 ft) from König. The German ships were at a severe disadvantage as they were sailing in a narrow swept channel and could not maneuver, so they reversed course to get out of range.

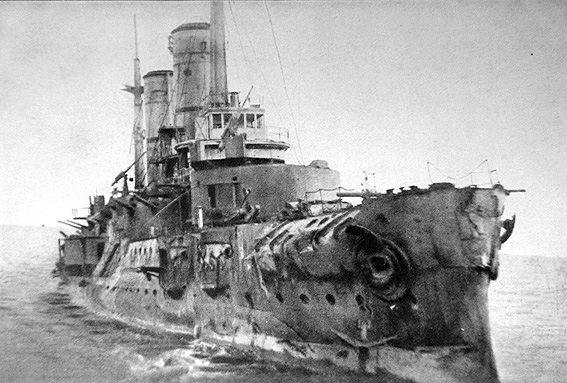
The sinking Slava

The German minesweepers made good progress, despite minor damage from shell splinters and numerous near misses by Slava, Grazhdanin, Bayan, and the Russian shore batteries. During this period Slava's front turret became inoperable when a bronze rack and pinion gear bent so that the gear wheel could not be moved. Only eleven shots had been fired between the two guns in the turret before the breakdown. Slava and her consorts were ordered north to allow the crews to eat lunch, but returned to the fray and opened fire on the minesweepers again at 10:04 with her rear turret at an approximate range of 12,000 yards (10,973 m). The minesweepers had cleared a channel to the north while the Russians were eating and the dreadnoughts took advantage of it to engage the Russian pre-dreadnoughts. König opened fire on Slava at 10:14 and hit her with three shells from her third salvo. The first hit Slava's bow, 10–12 feet (3.0–3.7 m) below the waterline, and exploded in the bow dynamo room, flooding that room, the forward 12-inch magazine and other bow compartments, while the second penetrated the capstan flat. The ship took on 1,130 metric tons (1,112 long tons) of water which gave her a list of 8°, later reduced to 4° by counter-flooding. This also increased her forward draft to about 32 feet (9.8 m). The third shell hit the port side armor abreast the engine room, but failed to penetrate. Two more shells struck her at 10:24 in the superstructure near the forward funnel. They damaged a six-inch magazine and the forward stokehold (boiler room) and started a fire which was put out after about fifteen minutes. However, the forward left six-inch magazine was flooded as a precaution. At 10:39 two more shells hit her, killing three men in the boiler room and flooding a coal bunker. Around this time Slava and her compatriots were ordered to retire to the north while Bayan trailed behind to divert fire from the battleships.

Slava's draft had increased too much to allow her to use the dredged channel between Hiiumaa Island and Vormsi (Worms) Island so she was ordered to wait until all the other deep-draft ships had entered the channel and then scuttle herself at the channel entrance. However, the Sailors' Committee organized on the ship after the February Revolution had ordered the engine room abandoned for fear of sinking, and she grounded on a shoal southeast of the channel because there was no one to obey the captain's order to stop. A number of destroyers evacuated the crew before the rear 12-inch magazine exploded at 11:58. However this was not deemed sufficient and three destroyers were ordered to torpedo her. Only one of their six torpedoes worked and Slava settled on the shallow bottom with a hole on the starboard side near the funnel. She was officially struck off the navy list on 29 May 1918 by the Soviets and scrapped in 1935 by the Estonians.

== Bibliography ==
- Budzbon, Przemysław (1985). "Russia". In Gray, Randal (ed.). Conway's All the World's Fighting Ships 1906–1921. Annapolis, Maryland: Naval Institute Press. pp. 291–325. ISBN 0-85177-245-5.
- Halpern, Paul G. (1995). A Naval History of World War I. Annapolis, Maryland: Naval Institute Press. ISBN 1-55750-352-4.
- Harris, Mark (2025). The First World War in the Baltic Sea. Vol. 1: Essen's Triumph, 1914 to February 1915. Helion. ISBN 978-1-804519-10-3.
- McLaughlin, Stephen (2003). Russian & Soviet Battleships. Annapolis, Maryland: Naval Institute Press. ISBN 1-55750-481-4.
- Nekrasov, George M. (2004). Expendable Glory: A Russian Battleship in the Baltic, 1915–1917. East European Monographs. Vol. 636. Boulder, CO: East European Monographs. ISBN 0-88033-534-3.
- Staff, Gary (2008). Battle for the Baltic Islands 1917: Triumph of the Imperial German Navy. Barnsley, UK: Pen & Sword Maritime. ISBN 978-1-84415-787-7.
- Vinogradov, Sergei (2015). "Letter". Warship International. LII (1): 9–13. ISSN 0043-0374.
- Vinogradov, Sergei & McLaughlin, Stephen (2018). "The Battleship Slava (1903)". In Taylor, Bruce (ed.). The World of the Battleship: The Lives and Careers of Twenty-One Capital Ships of the World's Navies, 1880–1990. Barnsley: Seaforth Publishing. ISBN 978-0-87021-906-1.
