= Russian battleship Tsesarevich =

Russian pre-dreadnought battleship

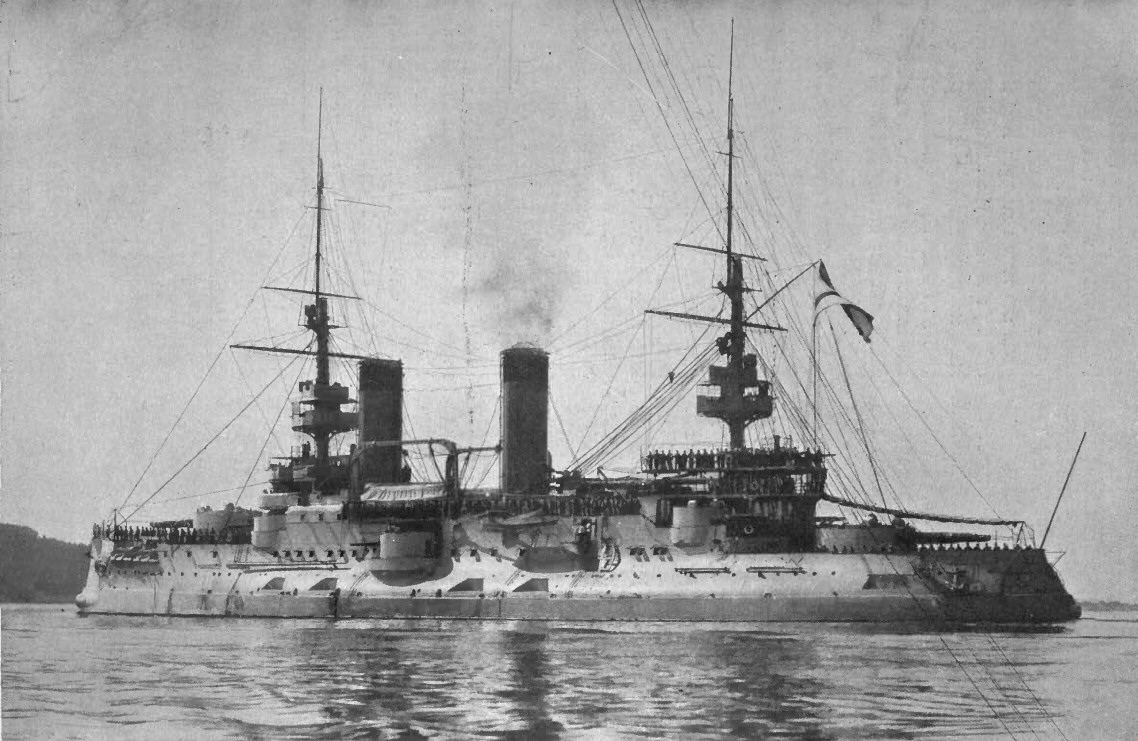
- Tsesarevich, before 1904

Class overview
- Operators: Imperial Russian Navy; (Soviet Union) Red Fleet
- Preceded by: Retvizan
- Succeeded by: Borodino class
- Cost: 11,355,000 rubles
- Built: 1899–1903
- In commission: 1903–1918
- Completed: 1
- Scrapped: 1

History

Russian Empire
- Name: Tsesarevich
- Namesake: Tsesarevich
- Ordered: 20 July 1898 (Note: All dates used in this article are new style)
- Builder: Forges et Chantiers de la Méditerranée, La Seyne-sur-Mer, France
- Laid down: 8 July 1899
- Launched: 23 February 1901
- Commissioned: 31 August 1903
- Renamed: Grazhdanin, 13 April 1917

RSFSR
- Name: Grazhdanin
- Namesake: Citizen
- Acquired: November 1917
- Decommissioned: May 1918
- Stricken: 21 November 1925
- Fate: Scrapped, 1924

General characteristics
- Type: Pre-dreadnought battleship
- Displacement: 13,105 t (12,898 long tons)
- Length: 118.5 m (388 ft 9 in)
- Beam: 23.2 m (76 ft 1 in)
- Draught: 7.92 m (26 ft 0 in)
- Installed power: 16,300 ihp (12,200 kW); 20 Belleville boilers
- Propulsion: 2 shafts, 2 triple-expansion steam engines
- Speed: 18 knots (33 km/h; 21 mph)
- Range: 5,500 nmi (10,200 km; 6,300 mi) at 10 knots (19 km/h; 12 mph)
- Complement: 778–79
- Armament: 2 × twin 305 mm (12 in) guns; 6 × twin 152 mm (6 in) guns; 20 × single 75 mm (3 in) guns; 20 × single 47 mm (1.9 in) guns; 8 × single 37 mm (1.5 in) guns; 4 × 381 mm (15 in) torpedo tubes
- Armour: Krupp armour; Waterline belt: 160–250 mm (6.3–9.8 in); Deck: 40–50 mm (1.6–2.0 in); Main Gun turrets: 250 mm (9.8 in); Barbettes: 250 mm (9.8 in); Conning tower: 254 mm (10 in)

Tsesarevich (Russian: Цесаревич) was a pre-dreadnought battleship of the Imperial Russian Navy, built in France at the end of the 19th century. The ship's design formed the basis of the Russian-built Borodino-class battleships. She was based at Port Arthur, northeast China, after entering service and fought in the Russo-Japanese War of 1904–1905. Tsesarevich was torpedoed during the surprise attack on Port Arthur and was repaired to become the flagship of Rear Admiral Wilgelm Vitgeft in the Battle of the Yellow Sea and was interned in Qingdao after the battle.

After the war, the ship was transferred to the Baltic Fleet and helped to suppress the Sveaborg Rebellion in mid-1906. While on a Mediterranean cruise, her crew helped survivors of the 1908 Messina earthquake in Sicily. Tsesarevich was not very active during the early part of World War I and her bored sailors joined the general mutiny of the Baltic Fleet in early 1917. Now named Grazhdanin, the ship participated in the Battle of Moon Sound in 1917, during which she was lightly damaged. The ship was seized by the Bolsheviks during the Russian Revolution in late 1917 and decommissioned the following year. Grazhdanin was scrapped in 1924–1925.

== Design and description ==
Tsar Nicholas II had desired a warm-water port on the Pacific since his accession to the throne in 1894. He achieved this ambition in March 1898 when Russia signed a 25-year lease for Port Arthur and the Liaotung Peninsula with China. Japan had previously forced China to sign over the port and its surrounding territory as part of the treaty that concluded the First Sino-Japanese War of 1894–1895, but the Triple Intervention of France, Russia, and Germany forced them to return the port in exchange for a sizeable increase in the indemnity paid by the Chinese. Japan invested much of the indemnity money in expanding its fleet, while Russia began a major building programme ("For the Needs of the Far East") to defend its newly acquired port.

Russian shipyards were already at full capacity so the Naval Ministry decided to order ships from abroad. Specifications were issued on 14 June 1898 and a few days later the chief designer of the French shipyard Forges et Chantiers de la Méditerranée proposed a design based on that of the French battleship Jauréguiberry. The Naval Technical Committee approved the design with a few changes to which the French readily agreed. The General Admiral, Grand Duke Alexei Alexandrovich, selected the French design over a competing proposal from the Baltic Works. A contract was signed on 20 July 1898 at a cost of 30.28 million francs (11.355 million rubles) for delivery in 42 months.

Tsesarevich's most obvious design feature was her tumblehome hull. This had several advantages because it allowed greater freeboard since the narrow upper decks reduced the structural weight of the vessel's hull, it increased the field of fire of guns mounted on the sides, and it reduced the ship's roll in heavy seas. Its great disadvantage was that it reduced buoyancy and stability which contributed to excessive heel during turns. During the Battle of the Yellow Sea in August 1904, Imperial Japanese Navy observers thought the Tsesarevich was going to capsize when she suddenly turned out of the battleline.

Tsesarevich was 118.5 metres (388 ft 9 in) long overall, had a beam of 23.2 metres (76 ft 1 in) and a draught of 7.92 metres (26 ft 0 in). The ship displaced 13,105 tonnes (12,898 long tons). Her crew consisted of 28–29 officers and 750 enlisted men.

The ship was powered by two vertical triple-expansion steam engines using steam generated by 20 Belleville boilers at a working pressure of 19 kg/cm^{2} (1,863 kPa; 270 psi). The boilers were fitted with economizers that preheated their feed water. The engines were rated at 16,300 indicated horsepower (12,200 kW) and designed to reach a top speed of 18 knots (33 km/h; 21 mph). Tsesarevich handily exceeded her design speed and reached 18.77 knots (34.76 km/h; 21.60 mph) from 15,254 ihp (11,375 kW) during her official machinery trials in July–August 1903. She normally carried 800 long tons (810 t) of coal, but could carry a maximum of 1,350 long tons (1,370 t). This allowed the ship to steam for 5,500 nautical miles (10,200 km; 6,300 mi) at a speed of 10 knots (19 km/h; 12 mph). Tsesarevich was fitted with six steam-driven electric generators with a total capacity of 550 kilowatts (740 hp).

=== Armament and fire control ===
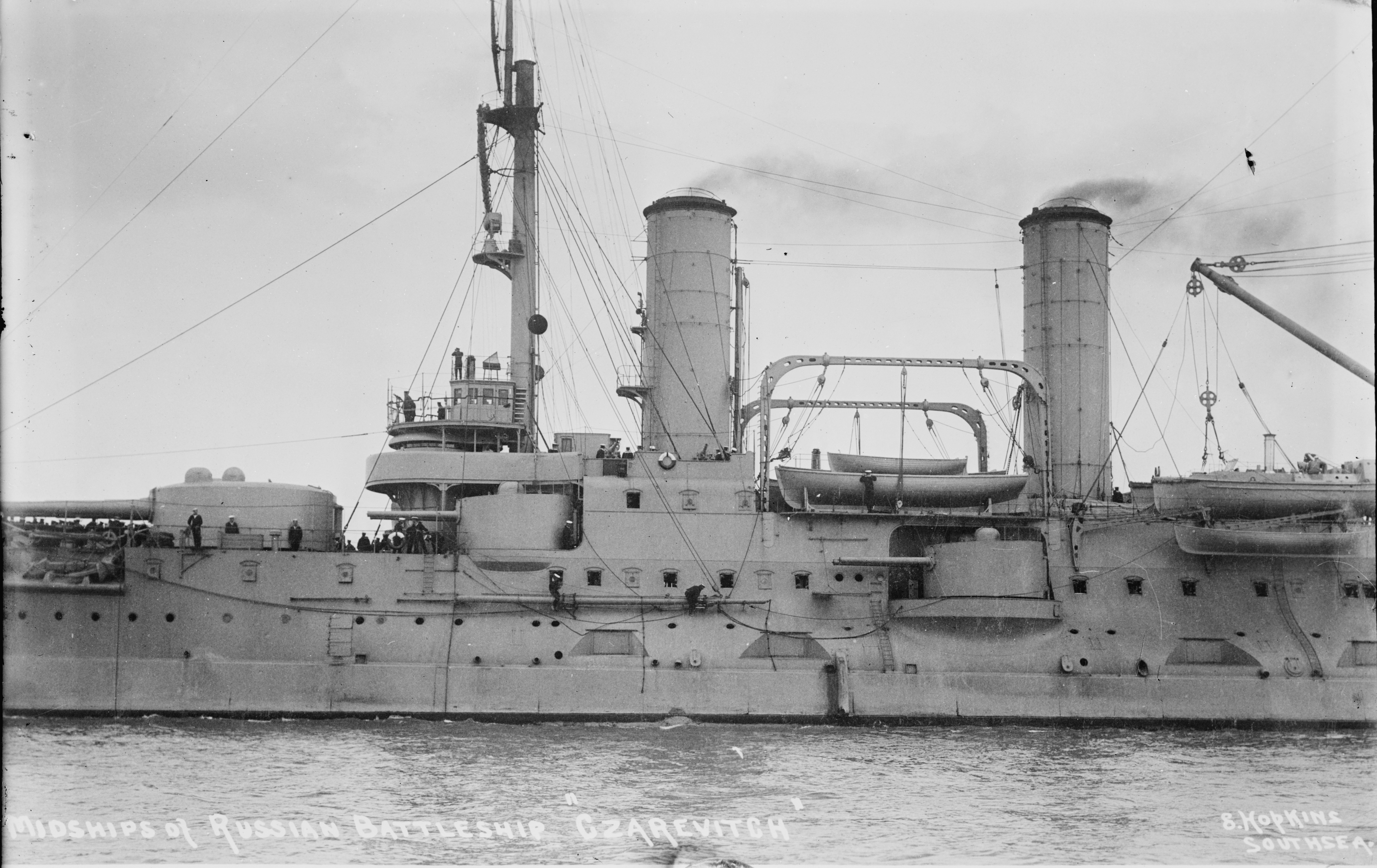
Midships of Tsesarevich, showing the forward 12-inch turret and two of the 6-inch turrets

Tsesarevich's main armament consisted of two pairs of 40-calibre 12-inch guns mounted in electrically powered twin-gun turrets, one forward and one aft of the superstructure. The guns and their mountings were Russian-built, but the turrets themselves were made in France. The guns could be loaded at all angles of elevation and the turrets could traverse 270°. Trials revealed that the ammunition hoists tended to jam when the ship was rolling; the shipyard shipped new hoists to Port Arthur because the Russians wanted the ship in the Far East as soon as possible and they were installed in January 1904. The ship carried 70 rounds per gun. The guns fired one shell every 90–132 seconds. They fired a 731.3-pound (331.7 kg) shell at a muzzle velocity of 2,598 ft/s (792 m/s) to a range of 16,010 yards (14,640 m) at an elevation of 15°.

The secondary armament of a dozen 45-caliber Canet Model 1892 6-inch (152 mm) (QF) guns was mounted in six electrically powered twin-gun turrets on the upper deck. The corner turrets had a 150° arc of fire and the center turrets could cover 180°. Each gun was provided with 200 rounds. Their rate of fire was 2–4 rounds per minute. They fired shells that weighed 91 lb (41.4 kg) with a muzzle velocity of 2,600 ft/s (792.5 m/s). They had a maximum range of approximately 12,600 yards (11,500 m).

A number of smaller guns were carried for defense against torpedo boats. These included twenty 50-calibre Canet QF 75-millimetre (3 in) guns; 14 in hull embrasures and the remaining six mounted on the superstructure. The ship carried 300 shells for each gun. They fired a 11-pound (4.9 kg) shell at a muzzle velocity of 2,700 ft/s (820 m/s) to a maximum range of 7,005 yards (6,405 m) at an elevation of 13°. Tsesarevich also mounted twenty 47-millimetre (1.9 in) Hotchkiss guns in the superstructure. They fired a 2.2-pound (1.00 kg) shell at a muzzle velocity of 1,400 ft/s (430 m/s) at a rate of around 15 rounds per minute. Eight smaller Maxim QF 37-millimetre (1.5 in) guns were also fitted, but their locations are unknown. They fired a 1-pound (0.45 kg) shell at a muzzle velocity of 1,319 ft/s (402 m/s).

The ship carried four 381-millimetre (15 in) torpedo tubes; two of these were mounted above water in the bow and stern, and the two broadside underwater tubes were located near the forward 12-inch magazine. Tsesarevich carried a total of 14 torpedoes. The ship also carried 45 mines to be laid to protect her anchorage in remote areas.

The ship was fitted with two British Barr and Stroud coincidence rangefinders that used two images that had to be superimposed to derive the range. The gunnery officer then calculated the proper elevation and deflection required to hit the target and transmitted his commands via a Geisler electro-mechanical fire-control transmission system to each turret.

=== Protection ===
Tsesarevich used the latest Krupp armor in a version of the French cellular armor scheme. This consisted of a full-length waterline armoured belt with armored decks above and below. Behind the belt were well-subdivided compartments mostly used to store coal. This was intended to keep the ship afloat regardless of the damage inflicted above the upper armoured deck. The waterline armor belt was 2 metres (6 ft 7 in) high, with 1.5 metres (4 ft 11 in) below the waterline at normal load. It had a maximum thickness of 250 millimetres (9.8 in) for a length of 60 metres (196 ft 10 in) amidships which gradually reduced to a thickness of 180 millimetres (7.1 in) at the bow and 170 millimetres (6.7 in) at the stern. The belt tapered to a thickness of 170 millimetres at its bottom edge amidships and presumably tapered proportionally along its length. Above the waterline belt was an upper strake of armour that was 1.67 metres (5 ft 6 in) high and had a maximum thickness of 200 millimetres (7.9 in). It was slightly shorter than the waterline belt and similarly reduced in thickness towards the ends of the ship. Forward it consisted of 120-millimetre (4.7 in) armour plates and 130 millimetres (5.1 in) aft.

The armor of the main gun turrets and their supporting tubes was 250 millimetres thick with roofs 63 millimetres (2.5 in) thick. Below the upper armour deck the armour of the support tubes decreased to 100 millimetres (3.9 in). The turrets of the secondary armament had 150-millimetre (5.9 in) sides with 30 millimetres (1.2 in) roofs. The sides of the conning tower were 254 millimetres (10.0 in) thick and it had a 63-millimetre roof. It had a communications tube that extended down to the upper armoured deck that was protected by 100-millimetre armour. The funnel uptakes were protected by 19 millimetres (0.7 in) of armour for the height of one deck above the upper armoured deck.

Above the upper armour belt there was a deck that ran the full length of the ship that consisted of a 50-millimetre (2.0 in) armour plate laid on 10-millimetre (0.39 in) deck plating. At the top of the waterline belt was two layers of 20-millimetre (0.79 in) armour. It also extended the full length of the ship, but not the full width; it curved downward behind the belt and was connected to the lower edge of the belt by a 20-millimetre plate. It continued downward to the ship's inner bottom plates and formed a sort of torpedo bulkhead. This bulkhead was 2 metres (6 ft 7 in) from the side of the ship and extended for a length of 84 metres (275 ft 7 in). It was backed with coal bunkers.

== Construction and service ==
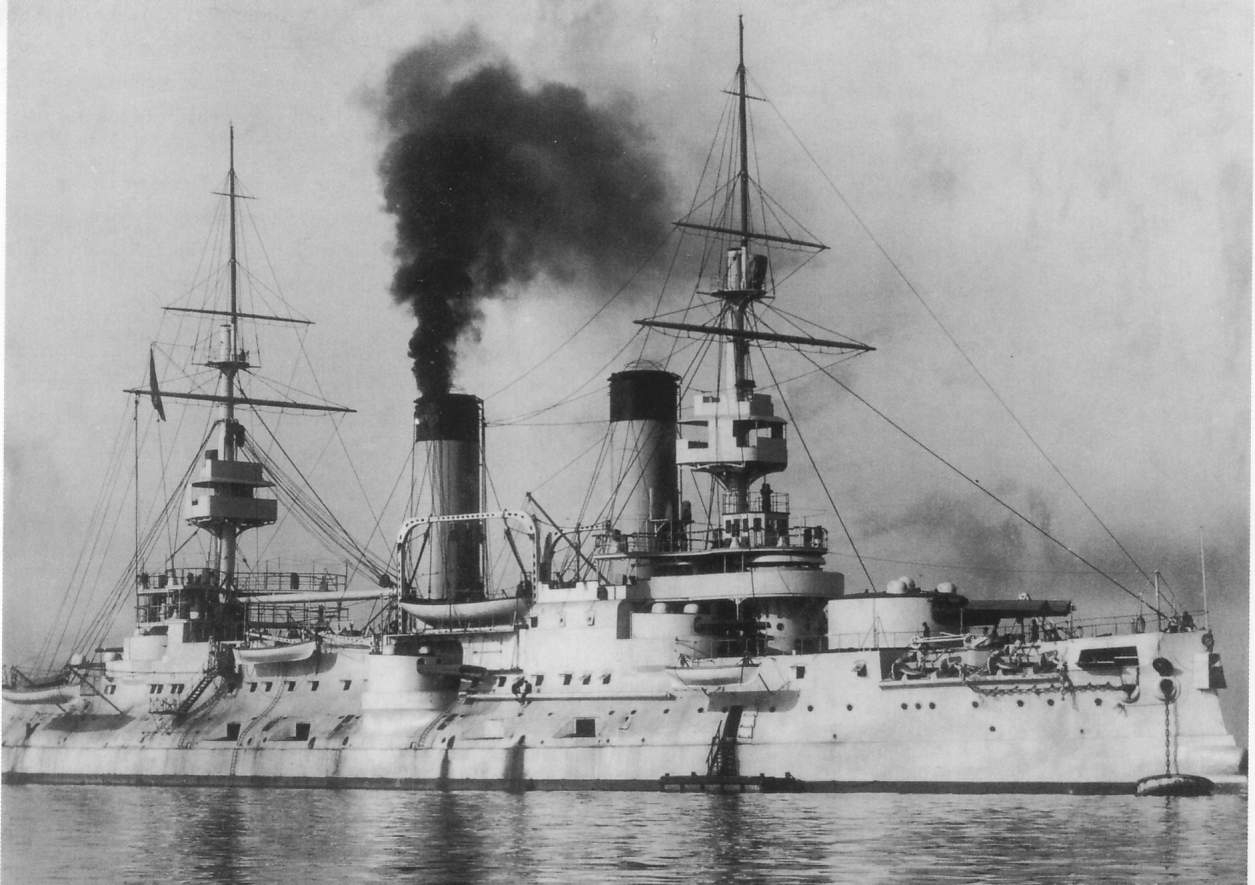
Tsesarevich during her sea trials in Toulon, France, 1903

Construction began on Tsesarevich, named after the title of the heir to the Russian throne, on 18 May 1899 at the Forges et Chantiers de la Méditerranée shipyard in La Seyne-sur-Mer, France. The ship was laid down on 8 July 1899 and launched on 23 February 1901. Construction was supervised by Captain Ivan Grigorovich, who became the ship's first captain. Tsesarevich entered service in August 1903 and was assigned to the Far East. She arrived in Port Arthur on 2 December 1903. Upon completion, the Tsesarevich was the Russian Navy's best battleship at the beginning of the Russo-Japanese War.

After the Japanese victory in the First Sino-Japanese War of 1894–1895, both Russia and Japan had ambitions to control Manchuria and Korea, resulting in tensions between the two nations. Japan had begun negotiations to reduce the tensions in 1901, but the Russian government was slow and uncertain in its replies because it had not yet decided exactly how to resolve the problems. Japan interpreted this as deliberate prevarication designed to buy time to complete the Russian armament programs. The situation was worsened by Russia's failure to withdraw its troops from Manchuria in October 1903 as promised. The final straws were the news of Russian timber concessions in northern Korea and the Russian refusal to acknowledge Japanese interests in Manchuria while continuing to place conditions on Japanese activities in Korea. These actions caused the Japanese government to decide in December 1903 that war was inevitable. As tensions with Japan increased, the Pacific Squadron began mooring in the outer harbor at night in order to react more quickly to any Japanese attempt to land troops in Korea.

=== Russo-Japanese War ===
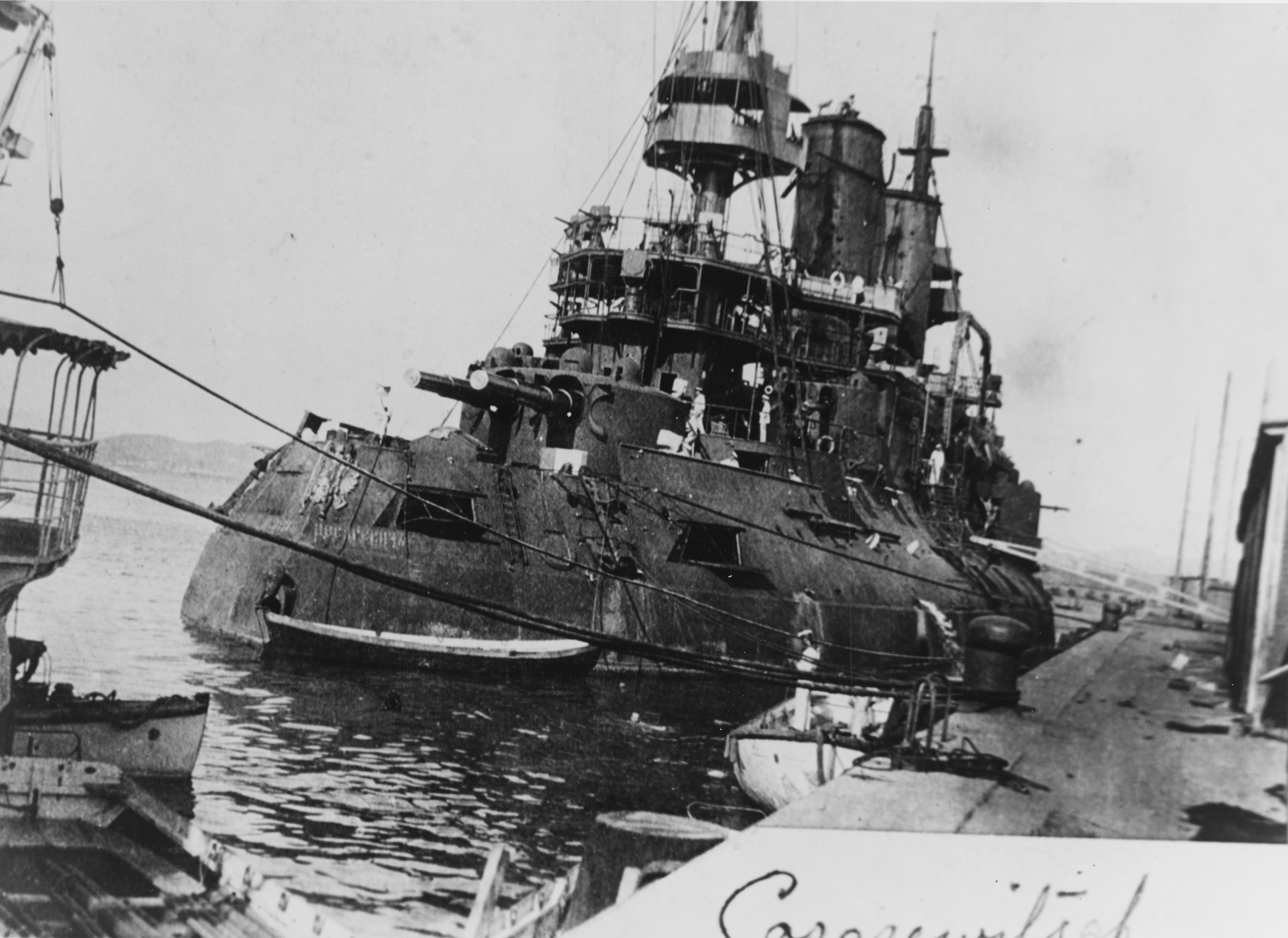
A stern view of Tsesarevich dockside at Port Arthur, 1904. Shrapnel holes are visible in her funnels.

She was one of three ships to be struck by Japanese torpedoes in the surprise attack on the night of 8/9 February 1904. Tsesarevich was hit abaft the portside torpedo bulkhead and the ship took on an 18° list that was partially corrected by counterflooding compartments on the starboard side. She got underway, but ran aground at the narrow harbor entrance. She was refloated and moved into the harbour for repairs that lasted until 7 June. Some of the ship's guns were removed during the summer to reinforce the defenses of the port. Tsesarevich lost a total of four 75-millimetre, two 47-millimetre and two 37-millimetre guns. The ship was hit twice on 7 August by Japanese 4.7-inch (120 mm) shells fired at long range; a fragment from one of them lightly wounded rear admiral Wilgelm Vitgeft.

==== Battle of the Yellow Sea ====
On the morning of 10 August, the First Pacific Squadron sortied from Port Arthur in an attempt to break through the Japanese fleet blockading the port and reach Vladivostok. The Russian squadron consisted of six battleships, Tsesarevich, Retvizan, Pobeda, Peresvet, Sevastopol and Poltava, along with four protected cruisers and eight destroyers. The Japanese fleet, commanded by Vice Admiral Tōgō Heihachirō, was comprised four battleships, Mikasa, Asahi, Fuji, Shikishima, two armoured cruisers Nishin and Kasuga, as well as seven protected cruisers.

Tsesarevich and Pobeda both suffered mechanical problems within an hour of departure that forced the fleet to slow down to a speed of 13 knots (24 km/h; 15 mph). Tōgō failed in his attempt to cross the Russian's T after spotting them around 12:25 and a general engagement began around 13:25 with the Japanese ships concentrating their fire on Tsesarevich and Retvizan, but the effective Russian fire forced Togo to disengage around 15:20. He closed with the Russians about two hours later and opened fire at 17:35. Neither side was able to mortally damage any ships while the Russians were still in the lead with about a half-hour of daylight left when two 12-inch shells fired by Asahi struck near Tsesarevich's conning tower at 18:40. Shell fragments bounced off the conning tower's overhanging roof into the conning tower, killing Vitgeft, two staff officers and the helmsman. The ship turned to port with the steering wheel jammed and was followed by several other battleships. Tsesarevich became the focus of attention from every Japanese ship so the captain of Retvizan decided to charge the Japanese battleline to buy time for Tsesarevich to fix her steering problem. He succeeded in doing so and the squadron's second-in-command, Rear Admiral Prince Pavel Ukhtomsky gradually asserted command over the scattered Russian ships and ordered them back to Port Arthur in the darkness. Tsesarevich attempted to head north to Vladivostok in the dark, but her damaged funnels greatly increased her coal consumption and reduced her speed to only 6 knots (11 km/h; 6.9 mph) so that she was forced to head for the German treaty port of Qingdao instead with three destroyers for escort. Upon arrival the following day, Tsesarevich and her companions were interned and disarmed. The ship had been hit by thirteen 12-inch and two 8-inch (203 mm) shells that killed 12 and wounded 47 members of her crew.

=== Post Russo-Japanese War and WWI ===
At the end of the Russo-Japanese war, the ship was transferred to the Baltic in early 1906 and helped to suppress the Sveaborg Rebellion on 1 August. Around 1906, her fighting top was removed and her superstructure was cut down. The 75-millimetre guns in the superstructure were apparently removed as well. Tsesarevich made regular winter cruises to the Mediterranean before World War I and aided survivors of the Messina earthquake in December 1908. In 1909–1910 the ship's machinery was overhauled and her amidships casemated 75-millimetre guns were removed and plated over four years later. Tsesarevich was not very active during the early part of World War I and she reportedly received two 37-millimetre anti-aircraft guns during the war.

Her crew joined the general mutiny of the Baltic Fleet on 16 March 1917, after the idle sailors received word of the February Revolution in Saint Petersburg. She was renamed Grazhdanin (Russian: Гражданин (meaning Citizen)) on 13 April 1917 after the February Revolution. The ship took part in the Battle of Moon Sound in October 1917 off the coast of Estonia. During the climatic part of the battle, Grazhdanin engaged the German minesweepers on 17 October with little effect while the predreadnought Slava engaged the German dreadnoughts König and Kronprinz. The latter fired at Grazhdanin and hit her twice, killing one and wounding four crewmen, although neither hit caused significant damage. The German dreadnoughts outranged Grazhdanin, and she was forced to abandon Moon Sound in the face of German pressure.

By December the ship was in Kronstadt, where she came under the control of the Bolsheviks, and she was hulked there in May 1918. Grazhdanin was scrapped beginning in 1924, although she was not officially stricken from the Navy List until 21 November 1925.
