= Mikhail Bakhirev =

Russian admiral (1868–1920)

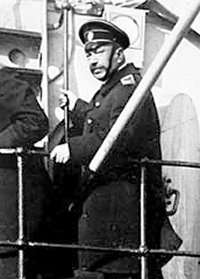
- Native name: Михаил Бахирев
- Born: July 17, 1868; Novocherkassk, Russian Empire
- Died: January 9, 1920 (aged 51) Petrograd, Russian SFSR
- Allegiance: Russian Empire; Russian Republic
- Branch: Imperial Russian Navy
- Service years: 1888–1917
- Rank: Rear Admiral
- Commands: Battleship squadron of the Baltic Fleet
- Conflicts: Boxer Rebellion; Russo-Japanese War; World War I; • Battle of Gotland
- Awards: Order of St. George; Order of Saint Stanislaus (Imperial House of Romanov); Order of St. Anna; Order of St. Vladimir; Légion d'honneur (France); Order of the Sacred Treasure (Japan)

Mikhail Koronatovich Bakhirev (Russian: Михаил Коронатович Бахирев; 17 July 1868 – 9 January 1920) was a Russian naval officer and admiral. Born into a Don Cossack family near Novocherkassk, his father was a sotnik in the cossacks of the Imperial Russian Army and he joined in 1888 as a cadet in the Imperial Russian Navy. Bakhirev served on the gunboat Bobr the Far Eastern Fleet and in January 1898 was transferred to the Baltic Fleet. A year later, he returned to the Far East. During the Boxer Rebellion, he commanded the gunboat Gilyaks.

During the Russo-Japanese War In 1904/05 he commanded Port Arthur torpedo boat Silny. Bakhirev participated in the defense of Port Arthur. Despite many casualties in the most difficult situations, he managed to impose calm and discipline. Between 1911 and 1914 he was commander of the armoured cruiser Rurik.

== World War I ==
At the start of World War I, Bakhirev served as the captain of the powerful armored cruiser Rurik, at that time the fleet flagship. On December 24, 1914 Bahirev was promoted to Rear Admiral given command of the 1st Cruiser Brigade. Between December 19, 1915 to May 23, 1917 he exercised command of the battleship squadron of the Baltic Fleet. During this period, he commanded Russian forces at the Battle of Åland Islands.

Two years later he was promoted to the rank of Vice-Admiral and the following year (August 21, 1917) he became chief of the naval forces in the Gulf of Riga (see Operation Albion and Battle of Moon Sound). On January 12, 1918 Bakhirev was dismissed from service and denied the right to collect a pension.

== Russian Revolution ==
After his dismissal from the Navy, Bakhirev exercised the profession of chief accountant in an industrial society. At the beginning of August 1918 he was arrested by Bolsheviks, but released again on March 13, 1919. On April 1, 1919, he started writing about the fighting in the Gulf of Riga between 1915 and 1917.

== Death ==
After the defeat of General Nikolai Yudenich against the Red Army, a new wave of arrests took place in Petrograd. Bakhirev refused to flee to Finland. On November 17, 1919 he was accused of complicity with Yudenich, and he was again imprisoned. On January 9, 1920, he was shot as a hostage.

== Honours and awards ==
=== Russia ===
- Order of St. Stanislaus (first class; October 30, 1895)
- Order of St. George (fourth class; October 19, 1900)
- Order of St. Anne (third class; December 6, 1901)
- Order of St. Vladimir (fourth class; 1902)
- Order of St. Stanislas (second class with swords; October 11, 1904)
- Gold Sword for Bravery (December 19, 1905)
- Order of St. Anne (second class with swords; March 19, 1907)
- Order of St. Vladimir (third class; December 6, 1913)
- Order of St. Vladimir (third class with swords; December 24, 1914)
- Order of St. Stanislas (first class with swords; August 10, 1915)
- Order of St. Anne (first class with swords; January 11, 1916)

=== Foreign ===
- Chevalier of the Legion of Honour (France; 1902)
- Order of the Sacred Treasure (fourth class, Japan; 1902)
- Officer of the Legion of Honour (France; 1909)
