= Coastal batteries of Romania =

The coastal batteries of Romania had a significant role to play in the country's naval warfare.

== War of Independence ==
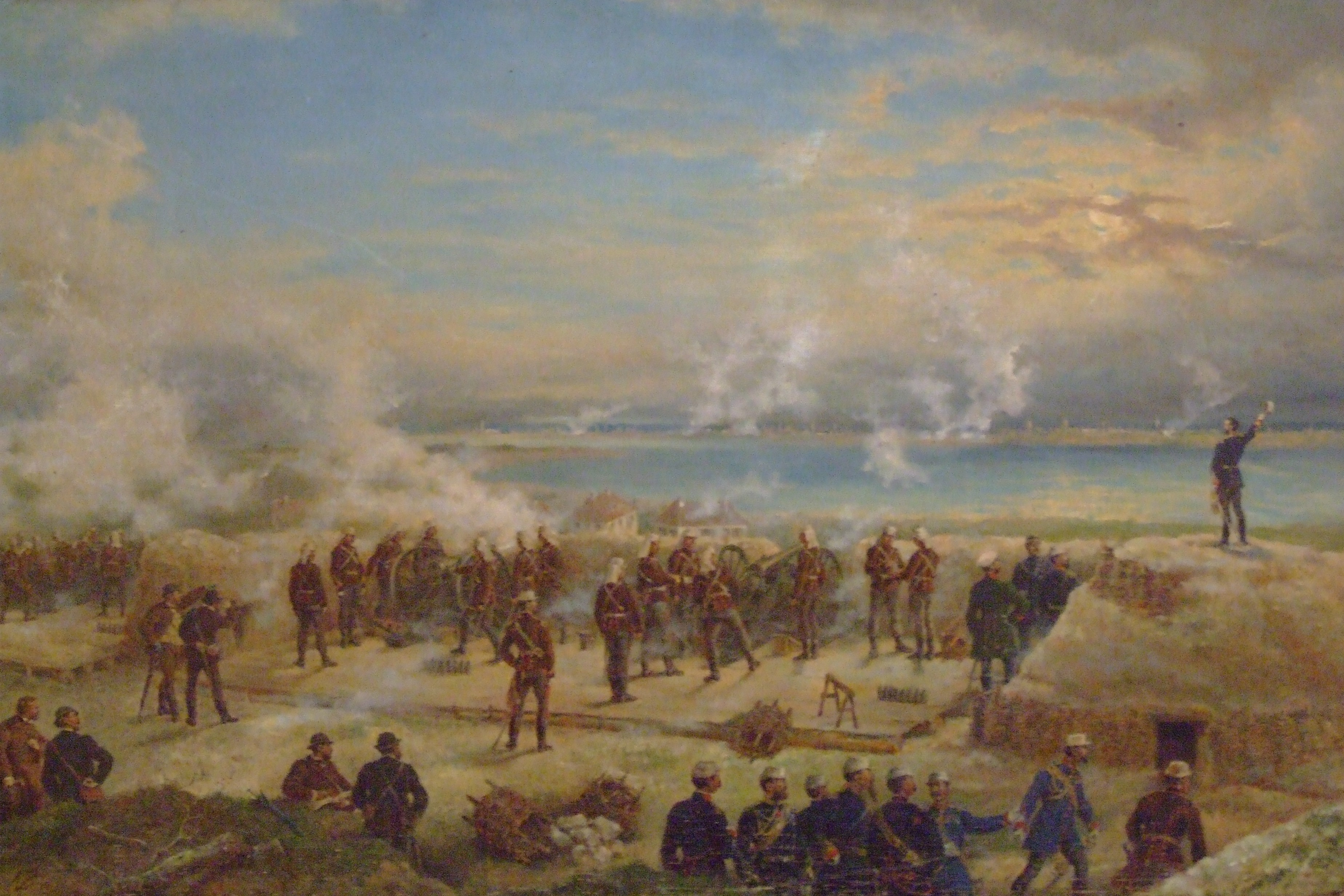
The first cannon shots of the Independence War from the Carol battery

During the Romanian War of Independence, coastal artillery on the Danube played a decisive role in the crossing of Romanian and Russian troops into Ottoman territory. At Calafat, a large concentration of fire power was gathered, comprising the batteries:

- Carol (4 x 152 mm bronze cannons and 6 x 87 mm Krupp cannons)
- Elisabeta (4 x 152 mm bronze cannons)
- Mircea (5 x 152 mm bronze cannons)
- Mihai Bravul (15 field guns)
- Renașterea (13 x 150 mm mortars)
- Independența (7 x 150 mm mortars and 6 x 150 mm cannons)
- Basarab (4 x 120 mm cannons)
- Ștefan cel Mare (4 x 120 mm cannons and 78 mm cannons)

On 7 November 1877, Romanian coastal artillery sank the Ottoman river monitor Podgorice.

== World War I ==
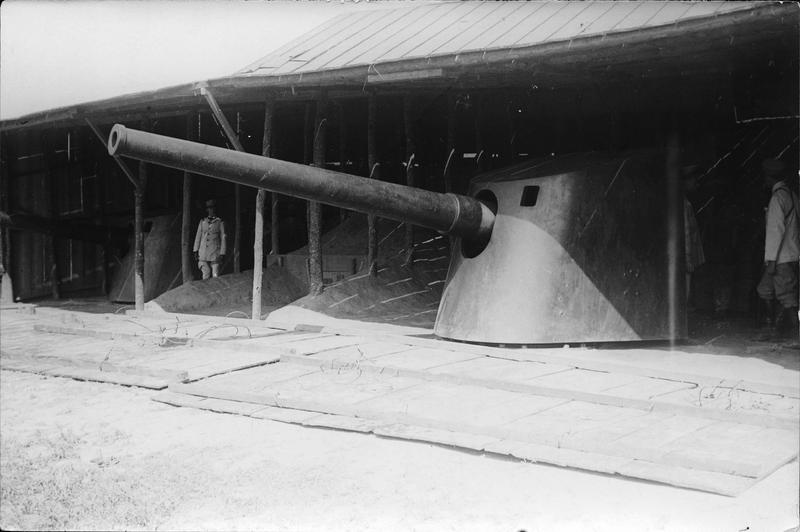
120 mm Saint Chamond naval cannon

During World War I, the Romanian coastal artillery expanded and diversified. It comprised the batteries:

- Regele Ferdinand (4 x 150 mm Krupp guns, taken from the Romanian cruiser Elisabeta)
- Regina Maria (4 x 120 mm Škoda howitzers, taken from the Romanian Danube monitors)
- Principele Nicolae (4 x 75 mm cannons)
- Grivița and Rahova (8 x 105 mm cannons)
- Battery Elisabetha (4 x 120 mm Saint Chamond cannons)
- Principele Mircea (4 x 75 mm Saint Chamond cannons)

The Romanian coastal batteries took part, along with the Romanian river monitors, in the Battle of Turtucaia. After the northwards retreat, some were re-assembled at Galați and were successfully used against German positions, again along with the river monitors, causing significant damage.

== World War II ==
=== Romanian batteries ===
On 22 June 1941, the Romanian coastal batteries were as follows:

- Mircea battery at Cape Midia (4 x 152 mm Obuhov guns)
- Tudor battery at Tataia (3 x 152 mm Armstrong guns)
- Constanța oraș battery (4 x 76.2 mm AA guns)
- Constanța port battery (4 x 66 mm Škoda guns)
- Elisabeta battery at Agigea (4 x 120 mm Saint Chamond guns)
- Constanța VII battery (4 x 75 mm Saint Chamond guns)
- Ștefan battery at Sulina (4 x 120 mm Škoda guns)
- Țepeș battery at Sulina (3 x 102 mm guns)
- Sulina section (2 x 76 mm naval/AA guns)
- Sfântu Gheorghe section (2 x 76 mm naval/AA guns)

=== German batteries ===
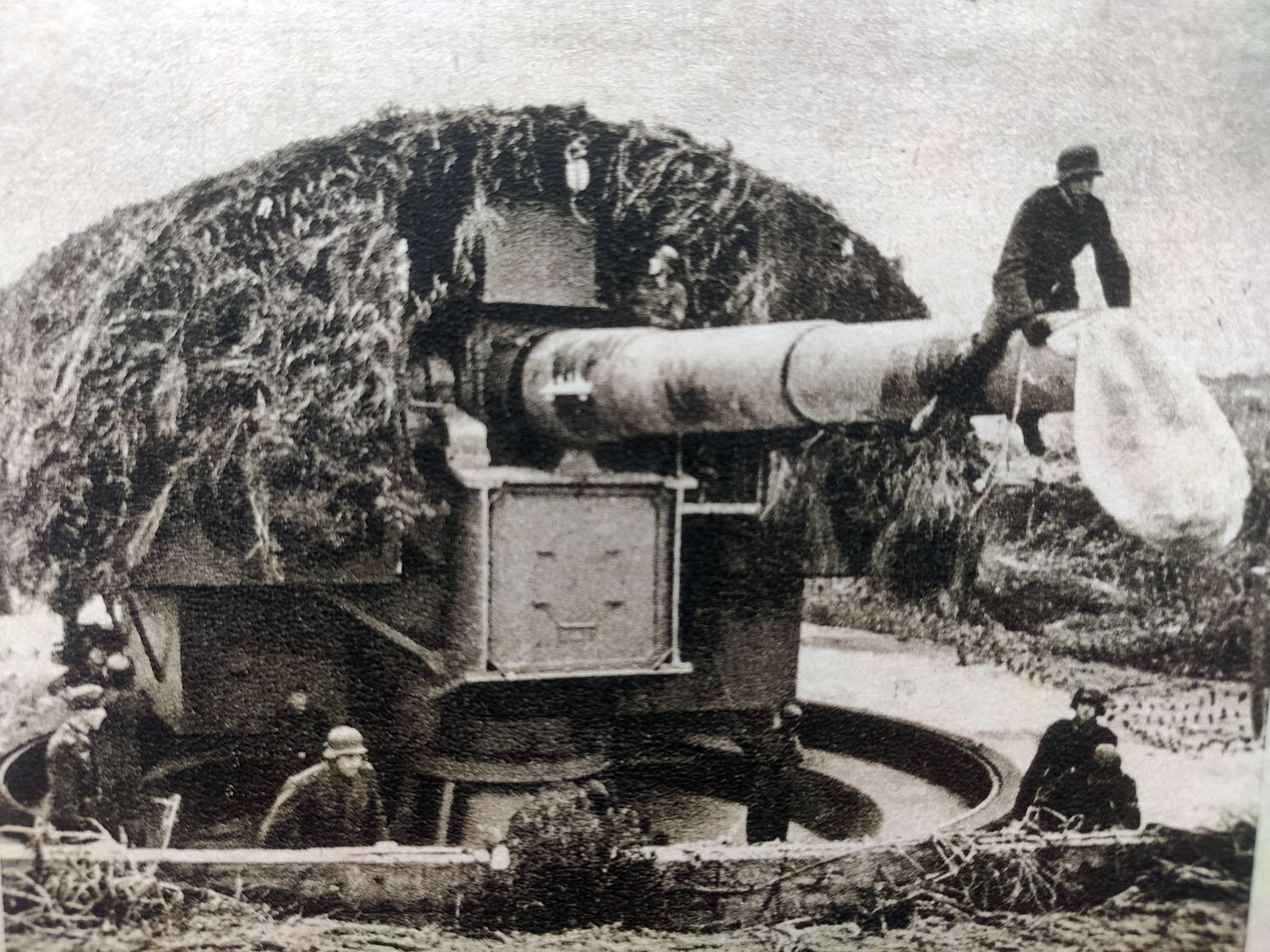
Tirpitz battery cannon

In order to boost Romanian coastal defenses, the Germans also built up their own batteries:

- Tirpitz battery (3 x 280 mm naval guns)
- Lange Bruno battery (3 x 280 mm naval guns)
- Breslau battery (3 x 170 mm naval guns)
- Comorova battery (3 x 152 mm Armstrong guns)
- Petru Rareș section (2 x 75 mm naval/AA guns)

The only time in World War II when the coastal batteries were used in combat was on 26 June 1941, when the Soviet Black Sea Fleet attacked Constanța. The attack was repelled by the Romanian destroyers Regina Maria and Mărășești supported by coastal artillery, the Tirpitz battery damaging the Soviet destroyer leader Kharkov.

== See also ==
- Heavy artillery in the Royal Romanian Armed Forces
