= German coastal battery Tirpitz =

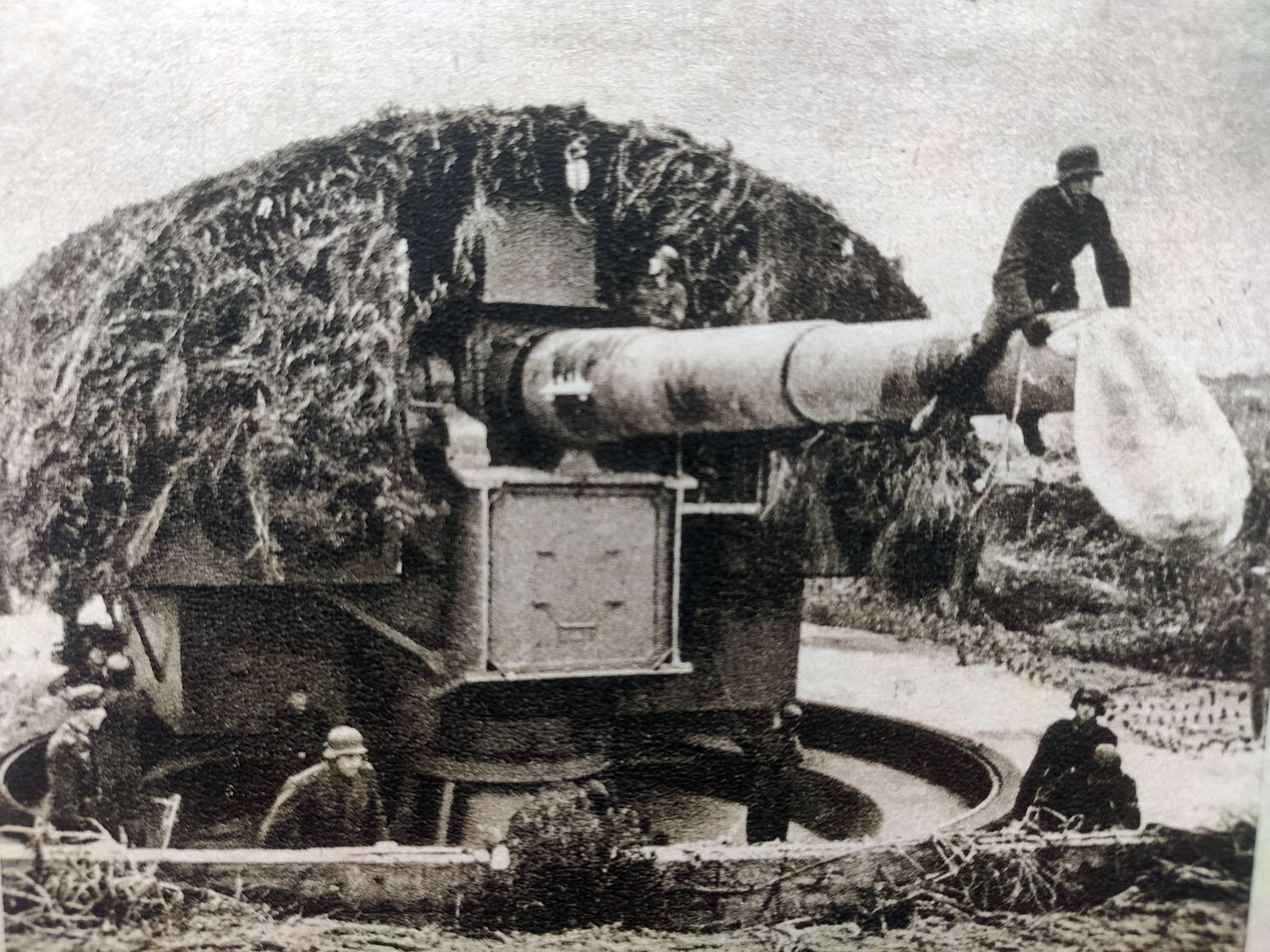
A 28 cm gun of the Tirpitz battery (Note: Note the silhouette of destroyer Moskva marked on the barrel)

The German coastal battery Tirpitz, consisting mainly of three large 280 mm guns, was the most powerful coastal battery on the Romanian shore during World War II. The three guns, model 28 cm SK L/45, came from spares for the World War I-era Nassau-class battleships. The name of the battery was given after German Grand Admiral Alfred von Tirpitz.

== History ==
After Romania joined the Axis by signing the Tripartite Pact in November 1940, German troops began crossing into the country to provide training and modernization to the Romanian Armed Forces. The Romanian coastal artillery was largely obsolete. As such, Romanian and German authorities agreed on the construction of the powerful battery south of the Romanian port of Constanța. Construction started in the winter of 1940, with many Romanians helping in its building, and the battery fired the first rounds in April 1941, in the presence of the Romanian War Minister, General Iosif Iacobici. The battery was protected by 75mm and 20mm AA guns. Nominally, the battery which was served by 700 Kriegsmarine personnel was under Romanian control, as were all the Axis forces in Romania. By late 1942, military personnel in and around Constanța amounted to 40,000 Romanians and 3,700 Germans. The battery saw combat use only once, when the Soviet surface fleet attacked Constanța on 26 June 1941, adding 39 rounds to the battle and damaging the Soviet destroyer leader Kharkov.

After the 23 August 1944 coup, the situation became uncertain. German Vice Admiral Helmuth Brinkmann had orders to hold Constanța at all costs. However, after a face-to-face meeting with Romanian Rear Admiral Horia Macellariu, he was persuaded to retreat orderly and avoid an unnecessary and costly battle. The Germans then retreated on the night of 25–26 August, but not before the battery was blown up before being surrendered to the Romanians.
