= SMS Westfalen =

Nassau-class battleship of the German Imperial Navy

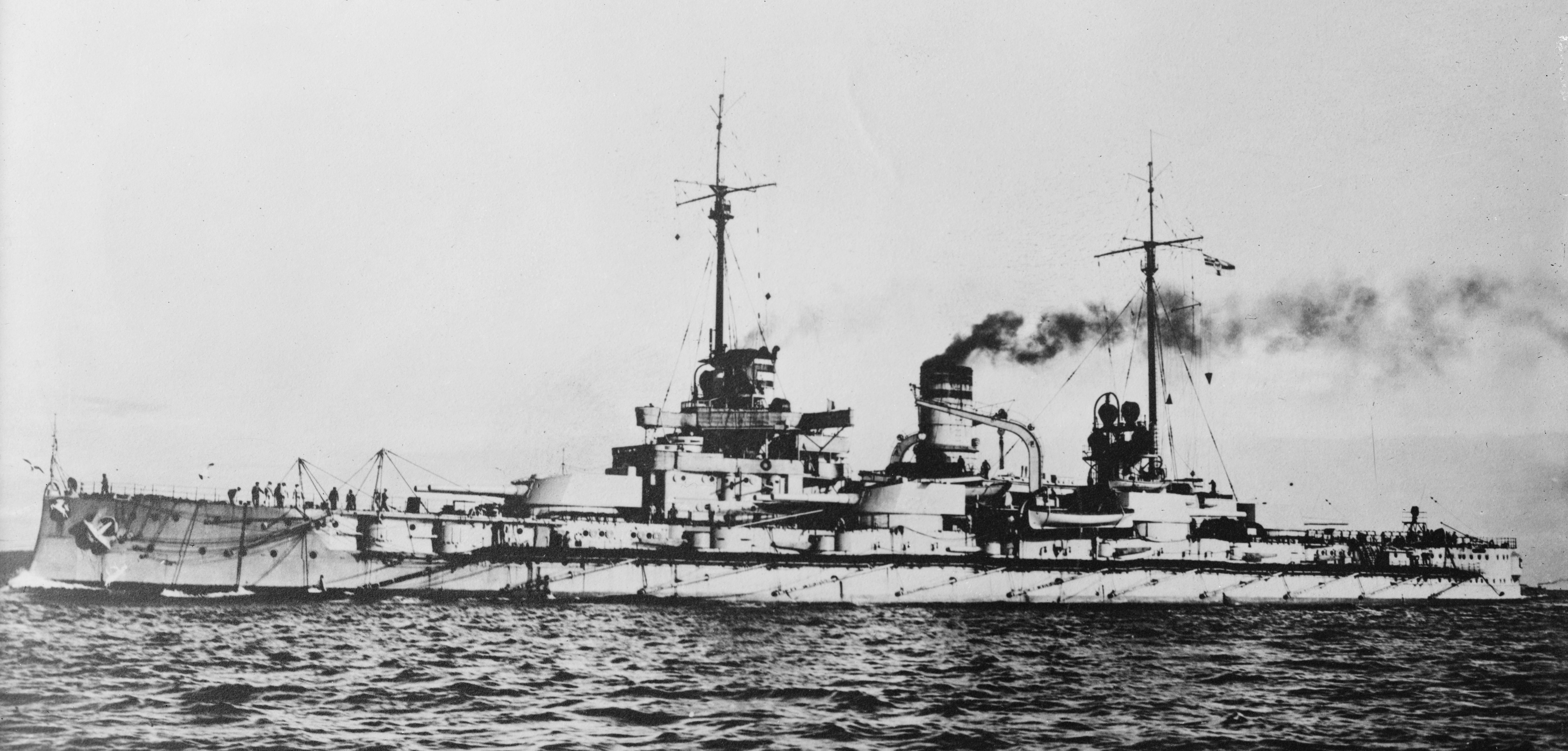
- SMS Westfalen

History

German Empire
- Namesake: Westphalia
- Builder: AG Weser, Bremen
- Laid down: 12 August 1907
- Launched: 1 July 1908
- Commissioned: 16 November 1909
- Decommissioned: 11 August 1918
- Stricken: 5 November 1919
- Fate: Ceded to the Allies, 1920. Scrapped, 1924

General characteristics
- Class & type: Nassau-class battleship
- Displacement: Normal: 18,873 t (18,575 long tons); Full load: 21,000 t (21,000 long tons)
- Length: 146.1 m (479 ft 4 in)
- Beam: 26.9 m (88 ft 3 in)
- Draft: 8.9 m (29 ft 2 in)
- Installed power: 12 × water-tube boilers; 22,000 metric horsepower (22,000 ihp; 16,000 kW)
- Propulsion: 3 × triple-expansion steam engines; 3 × screw propellers
- Speed: Designed: 19 knots (35 km/h; 22 mph); Maximum: 20.2 knots (37.4 km/h; 23.2 mph)
- Range: At 10 knots (19 km/h; 12 mph): 8,380 nmi (15,520 km; 9,640 mi)
- Complement: 40 officers; 968 men
- Armament: 12 × 28 cm (11 in) SK L/45 guns; 12 × 15 cm (5.9 in) SK L/45 guns; 16 × 8.8 cm (3.5 in) SK L/45 guns; 6 × 45 cm (17.7 in) torpedo tubes
- Armor: Belt: 300 mm (11.8 in); Turrets: 280 mm (11 in); Battery: 160 mm (6.3 in); Conning Tower: 300 mm; Torpedo bulkhead: 30 mm (1.2 in)

SMS Westfalen (Note: "SMS" stands for "Seiner Majestät Schiff", or "His Majesty's Ship".) was one of the Nassau-class battleships, the first four dreadnoughts built for the Imperial German Navy. Westfalen was laid down at AG Weser in Bremen on 12 August 1907, launched nearly a year later on 1 July 1908, and commissioned into the High Seas Fleet on 16 November 1909. The ship was equipped with a main battery of twelve 28 cm (11 in) guns in six twin turrets in an unusual hexagonal arrangement.

The ship served with her sister ships for the majority of World War I, seeing extensive service in the North Sea, where she took part in several fleet sorties. These culminated in the Battle of Jutland on 31 May – 1 June 1916, where Westfalen was heavily engaged in night-fighting against British light forces. Westfalen led the German line for much of the evening and into the following day, until the fleet reached Wilhelmshaven. On another fleet advance in August 1916, the ship was damaged by a torpedo from a British submarine.

Westfalen also conducted several deployments to the Baltic Sea against the Imperial Russian Navy. The first of these was during the Battle of the Gulf of Riga, where Westfalen supported a German naval assault on the gulf. Westfalen was sent back to the Baltic in 1918 to support the White Finns in the Finnish Civil War. The ship remained in Germany while the majority of the fleet was interned in Scapa Flow after the end of the war. In 1919, following the scuttling of the German fleet at Scapa Flow, Westfalen was ceded to the Allies as a replacement for the ships that had been sunk. She was then sent to ship-breakers in England, and broken up for scrap by 1924.

== Design ==
Design work on the Nassau class began in late 1903 in the context of the Anglo-German naval arms race; at the time, battleships of foreign navies had begun to carry increasingly heavy secondary batteries, including Italian and American ships with 20.3 cm (8 in) guns and British ships with 23.4 cm (9.2 in) guns, outclassing the previous German battleships of the Deutschland class with their 17 cm (6.7 in) secondaries. German designers initially considered ships equipped with 21 cm (8.3 in) secondary guns, but erroneous reports in early 1904 that the British Lord Nelson-class battleships would be equipped with a secondary battery of as many as ten 25.4 cm (10 in) guns prompted them to consider an even more powerful ship armed with an all-big-gun armament consisting of eight 28 cm (11 in) guns. This initial version was approved in March 1905, but further developments were incorporated over the course of the year, in part due to lessons learned during the on-going Russo-Japanese War. By January 1906, the design was refined into a larger vessel with twelve of the guns, by which time Britain had begun work on the all-big-gun battleship HMS Dreadnought.

=== Characteristics ===
Plan and profile drawing of the Nassau class

Westfalen was 146.1 m (479 ft 4 in) long, 26.9 m (88 ft 3 in) wide, and had a draft of 8.9 m (29 ft 2 in). She displaced 18,873 metric tons (18,575 long tons) with a standard load, and 20,535 t (20,210 long tons) fully laden. She had a flush deck and a ram bow, a common feature for warships of the period. Westfalen had a fairly small superstructure, consisting primarily of forward and aft conning towers. She was fitted with a pair of pole masts for signaling and observation purposes. The ship had a crew of 40 officers and 968 enlisted men.

The ship design retained 3-shaft triple expansion engines instead of the more advanced turbine engines. Steam was provided to the engines by twelve coal-fired water-tube boilers, with the addition in 1915 of supplementary oil firing. The boilers were vented through two funnels. Her propulsion system was rated at 22,000 metric horsepower (22,000 ihp; 16,000 kW) and provided a top speed of 20 knots (37 km/h; 23 mph). She had a cruising radius of 8,300 nautical miles (15,400 km; 9,600 mi) at a speed of 12 knots (22 km/h; 14 mph). (Note: This type of machinery was chosen at the request of both Admiral Alfred von Tirpitz and the Navy's construction department; the latter stated in 1905 that the "use of turbines in heavy warships does not recommend itself." This decision was based solely on cost: at the time, Parsons held a monopoly on steam turbines and required a 1 million gold mark royalty fee for every turbine engine made. German firms were not ready to begin production of turbines on a large scale until 1910.)

Westfalen carried a main battery of twelve 28 cm (11 in) SK L/45 (Note: In Imperial German Navy gun nomenclature, "SK" (Schnelladekanone) denotes that the gun quick firing, while "L/45" provides the length of the gun regarding the diameter of the barrel. In this case, the L/45 gun is 45 caliber, which means that the gun is 45 times as long as its diameter.) guns in six gun turrets arranged in an unusual hexagonal configuration. One was placed forward, another toward the stern, and the remaining four were placed on the wings, two per broadside. (Note: No foreign dreadnought at that time used this arrangement. HMS Dreadnought carried two wing turrets and three more on the centerline, while USS South Carolina mounted all four turrets in superfiring pairs on the centerline. The first Russian (Gangut) and Italian (Dante Alighieri) designs carried four gun turrets on the centerline.) Her secondary armament consisted of twelve 15 cm (5.9 in) SK L/45 guns, mounted in casemates located amidships. Close-range defense against torpedo boats was provided by a tertiary battery of sixteen 8.8 cm (3.5 in) SK L/45 guns, which were also mounted in casemates. The ship was also armed with six 45 cm (17.7 in) submerged torpedo tubes. One tube was mounted in the bow, another in the stern, and two on each broadside, on either end of the torpedo bulkhead.

The ship's hull was protected by heavy armor plate consisting of Krupp cemented steel. The belt armor along the sides of the hull was 29 cm (11.5 in) thick in the central portion, tapering down to 10 cm (4 in) at the bow. The belt was reinforced by an armored deck that angled downward at the sides to connect to the bottom edge of the belt. The deck was 3.8 cm (1.5 in) on the flat portion, while the sloped sides increased in thickness to 5.8 cm (2.3 in). Westfalen's main battery turrets had 28 cm of Krupp steel on their faces. Her forward conning tower had 30 cm (11.8 in) of armor plate on the sides, while the aft tower received only 20 cm (7.9 in) on the sides.

== Service history ==
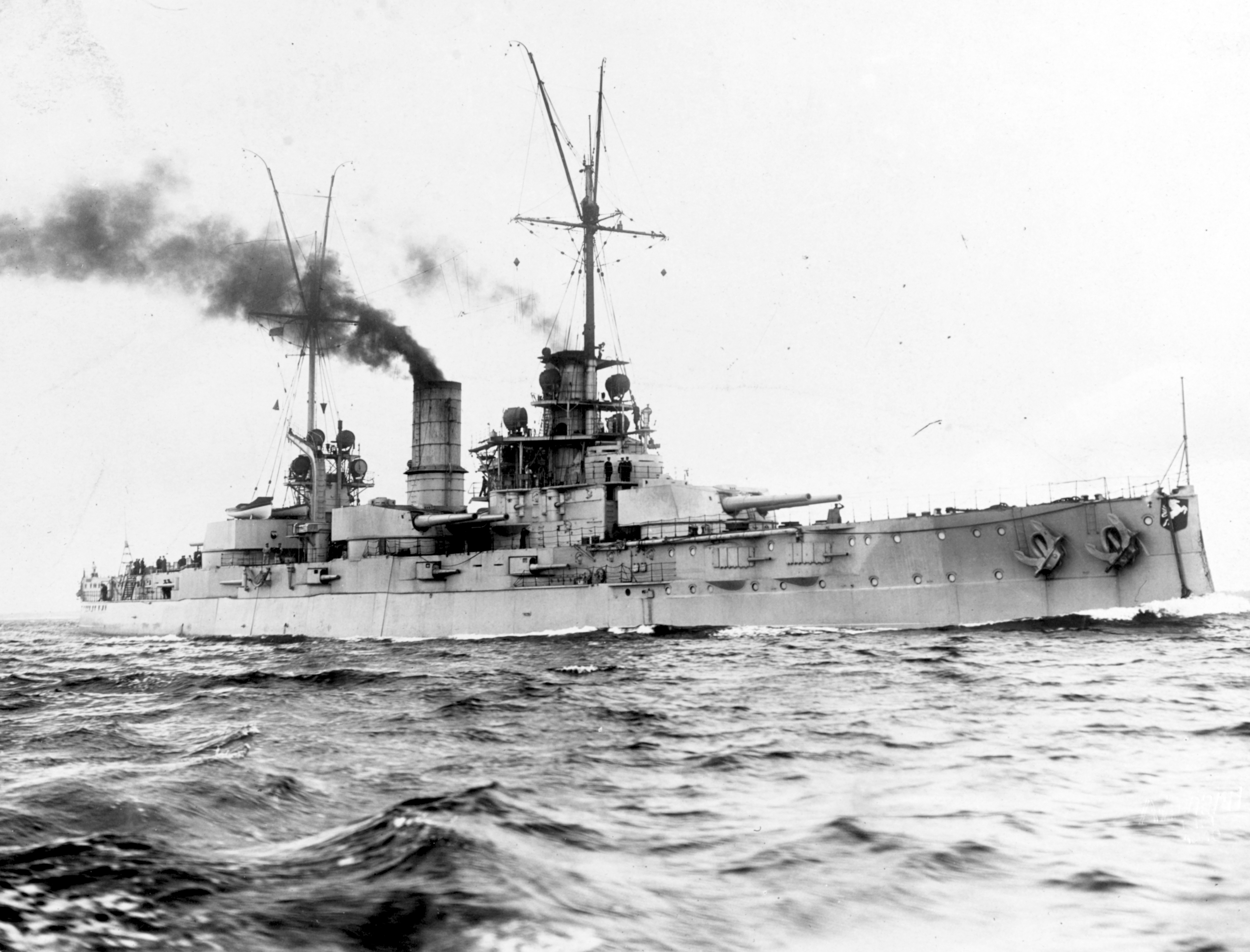
SMS Westfalen shortly after completion, c. 1910

The German Imperial Navy (Kaiserliche Marine) ordered Westfalen under the provisional name Ersatz Sachsen as a replacement for SMS Sachsen, the lead ship of the elderly Sachsen-class ironclads. (Note: German warships were ordered under provisional names. Additions to the fleet were given a single letter; ships intended to replace older or lost vessels were ordered as "Ersatz (name of the ship to be replaced)".) The Reichstag secretly approved and provided funds for Nassau and Westfalen at the end of March 1906, but construction on Westfalen was delayed while arms and armor were procured. She was laid down on 12 August 1907 at the AG Weser shipyard in Bremen. As with her sister Nassau, construction proceeded swiftly and secretly; detachments of soldiers guarded both the shipyard and the major contractors who supplied building materials, such as Krupp. The ship was launched on 1 July 1908, and Eberhard von der Recke von der Horst, the Oberpräsident (supreme president) of the ship's namesake province, gave a speech at the ceremony. Westfalen then underwent an initial fitting-out, and then in mid-September 1909 was transferred to Kiel by a crew composed of dockyard workers for a final fitting-out. However, the water level in the Weser River was low at this time of year, so six pontoons had to be attached to the ship to reduce her draft. Even so, it took two attempts before the ship cleared the river. The ship could not have been completed at AG Weser, as even at normal water levels, the ship would not have been able to clear the river at her completed displacement.

On 16 October 1909, before she was commissioned into the fleet, Westfalen along with her sister Nassau participated in a ceremony for the opening of the new third entrance in the Wilhelmshaven Naval Dockyard. Westfalen at that time still had her dockyard crew, and had still not completed fitting out. Exactly one month later, Westfalen was commissioned for sea trials, which were interrupted only by fleet training exercises in February 1910. The ship's first commander was Kapitän zur See (KzS—Captain at Sea) Friedrich Gädeke. At the completion of the trials on 3 May, Westfalen was added to I Battle Squadron of the High Seas Fleet, replacing the old battleship SMS Kaiser Barbarossa. Two days later, she became the squadron flagship, replacing the pre-dreadnought battleship SMS Hannover. At that time, the squadron was commanded by Konteradmiral (Rear Admiral) Hugo von Pohl. In May, the fleet conducted training maneuvers in the Kattegat. These were in accordance with Admiral Henning von Holtzendorff's strategy, which envisioned drawing the Royal Navy into the narrow waters there. The annual summer cruise was to Norway, and was followed by fleet training, during which another fleet review was held in Danzig on 29 August. KzS Paul Behncke replaced Gädeke after the review in September. A training cruise into the Baltic followed at the end of the year.

In March 1911, the fleet conducted exercises in the Skagerrak and Kattegat. Westfalen and the rest of the fleet received British and American naval squadrons at Kiel in June and July. The year's autumn maneuvers were confined to the Baltic and the Kattegat. Another fleet review was held afterward, during the exercises for a visiting Austro-Hungarian delegation that included Archduke Franz Ferdinand and Admiral Rudolf Montecuccoli. In October, KzS Wilhelm Starke relieved Behncke as the ship's captain. KzS Hugo Kraft took command of the ship in April 1912. On 29 April, the new battleship Ostfriesland joined I Squadron, replacing Westfalen as the squadron flagship, which then served as the flagship for the deputy commander of the squadron. In mid-1912, due to the Agadir Crisis, the summer cruise was confined to the Baltic, to avoid exposing the fleet during the period of heightened tension with Britain and France. A training cruise in the Baltic took place late in the year. The training program for 1913 proceeded in much the same pattern as in previous years. In October, KzS Johannes Redlich replaced Kraft as the ship's captain. The navy had intended to transfer the ship to II Battle Squadron in late 1914 to modernize that unit, but this plan was discarded after the outbreak of World War I in July.

=== World War I ===
Westfalen participated in most of the fleet advances into the North Sea throughout the war. The first operation was conducted primarily by Rear Admiral Franz von Hipper's battlecruisers; the ships bombarded the English coastal towns of Scarborough, Hartlepool, and Whitby on 15–16 December 1914. A German battlefleet of 12 dreadnoughts, including Westfalen, her three sisters and eight pre-dreadnoughts sailed in support of the battlecruisers. On the evening of 15 December, they came to within 10 nmi (19 km; 12 mi) of an isolated squadron of six British battleships. However, skirmishes between the rival destroyer screens in the darkness convinced the German fleet commander, Admiral Friedrich von Ingenohl, that the entire Grand Fleet was deployed before him. Under orders from Kaiser Wilhelm II, Ingenohl broke off the engagement and turned the battlefleet back towards Germany.

Westfalen next took part in the fleet advance on 24 January 1915 to support I Scouting Group after it was ambushed by the British 1st and 2nd Battlecruiser Squadrons during the Battle of Dogger Bank, though she again saw no action, as the battle had ended before the High Seas Fleet arrived late in the afternoon. Following the loss of the armored cruiser SMS Blücher at the Battle of Dogger Bank, the Kaiser removed Ingenohl from his post on 2 February. Now-Admiral Pohl replaced him as commander of the fleet. In late March, Westfalen went into drydock for periodic maintenance. Pohl conducted a series of fleet advances in 1915 in which Westfalen took part. On 21–22 April, the High Seas Fleet advanced towards the Dogger Bank, though again failed to meet any British forces. The fleet next went to sea on 29–30 May, advancing as far as Schiermonnikoog before being forced to turn back by inclement weather. On 10 August, the fleet steamed to the north of Helgoland to cover the return of the auxiliary cruiser Meteor.

==== Battle of the Gulf of Riga ====
In August 1915, the German fleet attempted to clear the Russian-held Gulf of Riga in order to assist the German army, which was planning an assault on Riga itself. To do so, the German planners intended to drive off or destroy the Russian naval forces in the Gulf, which included the pre-dreadnought battleship Slava and a number of smaller gunboats and destroyers. The German battlefleet was accompanied by several mine-warfare vessels, tasked first with clearing Russian minefields and then laying a series of their own minefields in the northern entrance to the Gulf to prevent Russian naval reinforcements from reaching the area. The assembled German fleet included Westfalen and her three sister ships, the four Helgoland-class battleships, the battlecruisers Von der Tann, Moltke, and Seydlitz, and several pre-dreadnoughts. The force operated under the command of Hipper, who had by now been promoted to vice admiral. The eight battleships were to provide cover for the forces engaging the Russian flotilla. The first attempt on 8 August was broken off, as it took too long to clear the Russian minefields.

On 16 August 1915, a second attempt was made to enter the gulf: Nassau and Posen, four light cruisers, and 31 torpedo boats managed to breach the Russian defenses. On the first day of the assault, two German light craft—the minesweeper T46 and the destroyer V99—were sunk. The following day, Nassau and Posen battled Slava, scoring three hits on the Russian ship that forced her to retreat. By 19 August, the Russian minefields had been cleared and the flotilla entered the gulf. However, reports of Allied submarines in the area prompted the Germans to call off the operation the following day. Admiral Hipper later remarked that "to keep valuable ships for a considerable time in a limited area in which enemy submarines were increasingly active, with the corresponding risk of damage and loss, was to indulge in a gamble out of all proportion to the advantage to be derived from the occupation of the gulf before the capture of Riga from the land side." In fact, the battlecruiser Moltke had been torpedoed that morning.

==== Return to the North Sea ====
Westfalen, date unknown

By the end of August Westfalen and the rest of the High Seas Fleet had returned to their anchorages in the North Sea. The next operation conducted was a sweep into the North Sea on 11–12 September, though it ended without any action. Another sortie followed on 23–24 October during which the German fleet did not encounter any British forces. On 12 January 1916, Admiral Reinhard Scheer replaced Pohl as the fleet commander; Scheer continued the aggressive fleet strategy of his predecessors. Westfalen was present during the fleet advance on 5–7 March, though this too ended without action. Further sorties were conducted on 26 March, 2–3 April, and 21–22 April, but none resulted in action with British forces. A bombardment mission followed two days later; Westfalen joined the battleship support for Hipper's battlecruisers while they attacked Yarmouth and Lowestoft on 24–25 April. During this operation, the battlecruiser Seydlitz was damaged by a British mine and had to return to port prematurely. Due to poor visibility, the operation was soon called off, leaving the British fleet no time to intercept the raiders.

==== Battle of Jutland ====
Maps showing the maneuvers of the British (blue) and German (red) fleets on 31 May – 1 June 1916

Scheer immediately planned another attack on the British coast. However, the damage to Seydlitz and condenser trouble on several of the III Battle Squadron dreadnoughts delayed the plan until the end of May 1916. The German battlefleet departed the Jade at 03:30 (Note: The times used in this article are in CET, which is one hour ahead of UTC, which is often used in British works.) on 31 May. Westfalen was assigned to II Division of I Battle Squadron, under the command of Rear Admiral W. Engelhardt. Westfalen was the last ship in the division, astern of her three sisters. II Division was the last unit of dreadnoughts in the fleet; they were followed by only the elderly pre-dreadnoughts of II Battle Squadron.

Between 17:48 and 17:52, eleven German dreadnoughts, including Westfalen, engaged and opened fire on the British 2nd Light Cruiser Squadron, though the range and poor visibility prevented effective fire, which was soon checked. At 18:05, Westfalen began firing again; her target was a British light cruiser, most probably the Southampton, at a range of 18,000 metres (19,690 yd). However, Westfalen scored no hits. Scheer had by this time called for maximum speed in order to pursue the British ships; Westfalen made 20 knots (37 km/h; 23 mph). By 19:30 when Scheer signaled "Go west", the German fleet had faced the deployed Grand Fleet for a second time and was forced to turn away. In doing so, the order of the German line was reversed; this would have put II Squadron in the lead, but Redlich of Westfalen noted that II Squadron was out of position and began his turn immediately, assuming the lead position.

Around 21:20, Westfalen and her sister ships began to be engaged by the battlecruisers of the 3rd Battlecruiser Squadron; several large shells straddled (fell to either side of) the ship and rained splinters on her deck. Shortly thereafter, two torpedo tracks were reported, though both turned out to be false sightings. The ships were then forced to slow down in order to allow the battlecruisers of I Scouting Group to pass ahead. Around 22:00, Westfalen and Rheinland observed unidentified light forces in the gathering darkness. After flashing a challenge via searchlight that was ignored, the two ships turned away to starboard in order to evade any torpedoes that might have been fired. The rest of I Battle Squadron followed them. During the brief encounter, Westfalen fired seven of her 28 cm shells in the span of about two and a half minutes. Westfalen again assumed a position guiding the fleet, this time because Scheer wanted lead ships with greater protection against torpedoes than the pre-dreadnoughts had.

At about 00:30, the leading units of the German line encountered British destroyers and cruisers. A violent firefight at close range ensued; Westfalen opened fire on the destroyer HMS Tipperary with her 15 cm and 8.8 cm guns at a distance of about 1,800 m (2,000 yd). Her first salvo destroyed Tipperary's bridge and forward deck gun. In the span of five minutes, Westfalen fired ninety-two 15 cm and forty-five 8.8 cm rounds at Tipperary before turning 90 degrees to starboard to evade any torpedoes that might have been fired. Nassau and several cruisers and destroyers joined in the attack on Tipperary; the ship was quickly turned into a burning wreck. The destroyer nevertheless continued to fire with her stern guns and launched her two starboard torpedoes. One of the British destroyers scored a hit on Westfalen's bridge with its 4-inch (10 cm) guns, killing two men and wounding eight; Redlich was slightly wounded. At 00:50, Westfalen spotted HMS Broke and briefly engaged her with her secondary guns; in about 45 seconds she fired thirteen 15 cm and thirteen 8.8 cm shells before turning away. Broke was engaged by other German warships, including the cruiser Rostock; she was hit at least seven times and suffered 42 dead, six missing, and 34 wounded crew members. An officer aboard the light cruiser Southampton described Broke as "an absolute shambles." Despite the serious damage inflicted, Broke managed to withdraw from the battle and reach port. Just after 01:00, Westfalen's searchlights fell on the destroyer Fortune, which was wrecked and set ablaze in a matter of seconds by Westfalen and Rheinland. At around 01:40, Westfalen engaged the destroyers Petard and Turbulent, inflicting serious damage to both with her secondary guns. Petard survived the encounter but Turbulent, which had also been hit repeatedly by other German battleships, was caught by a pair of torpedo boats, which took off survivors and then sank her with a torpedo.

Despite the ferocity of the night fighting, the High Seas Fleet punched through the British destroyer forces and reached Horns Reef by 4:00 on 1 June. With Westfalen in the lead, the German fleet reached Wilhelmshaven a few hours later, where the battleship and two of her sisters took up defensive positions in the outer roadstead. Over the course of the battle, the ship had fired fifty-one 28 cm shells, one-hundred and seventy-six 15 cm rounds, and one hundred and six 8.8 cm shells. Repair work followed immediately in Wilhelmshaven and was completed by 17 June.

==== Raid of 18–19 August ====
Another fleet advance followed on 18–22 August, during which the I Scouting Group battlecruisers were to bombard the coastal town of Sunderland in an attempt to draw out and destroy Beatty's battlecruisers. As only two of the four German battlecruisers were still in fighting condition, three dreadnoughts were assigned to the Scouting Group for the operation: Markgraf, Grosser Kurfürst, and the newly commissioned Bayern. The High Seas Fleet, including Westfalen at the rear of the line, would trail behind and provide cover. However, at 06:00 on 19 August, Westfalen was torpedoed by the British submarine HMS E23, some 55 nautical miles (102 km; 63 mi) north of Terschelling. The ship took in approximately 800 metric tons (790 long tons; 880 short tons) of water, but the torpedo bulkhead held. Three torpedo-boats were detached from the fleet to escort the damaged ship back to port; Westfalen made 14 kn (26 km/h; 16 mph) on the return trip. The British were aware of the German plans and sortied the Grand Fleet to meet them. By 14:35, Admiral Scheer had been warned of the Grand Fleet's approach and, unwilling to engage the whole of the Grand Fleet just 11 weeks after the close call at Jutland, turned his forces around and retreated to German ports. Repairs to Westfalen lasted until 26 September. During this period, KzS Hans Eberius relieved Redlich as the ship's commander.

Following the repair work, Westfalen briefly went into the Baltic Sea for training, before returning to the North Sea on 4 October. The fleet then advanced as far as the Dogger Bank on 19–20 October. The operation led to a brief action on 19 October, during which a British submarine torpedoed the cruiser München. The failure of the operation (coupled with the action of 19 August) convinced the German naval command to abandon its aggressive fleet strategy in favor of a resumption of the unrestricted submarine warfare campaign. The ship remained in port for the majority of 1917. In June, KzS Ernst Ewers briefly served as the ship's captain until he was replaced the following month, when he was replaced by KzS Hermann Bauer. The ship did not actively take part in Operation Albion in the Baltic, though she was stationed off Apenrade to prevent a possible British incursion into the area.

==== Expedition to Finland ====
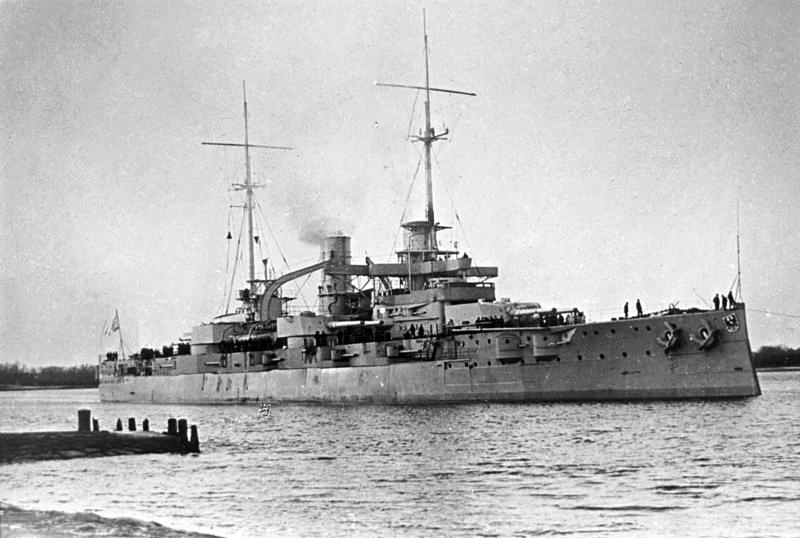
SMS Rheinland

In late 1917, the Grand Duchy of Finland declared independence from the collapsing Russian Empire, but the country quickly devolved into a civil war between the Whites and the Reds. As the latter were being supported by the new Communist government of Soviet Russia, which was still fighting Germany, the German government decided to intervene in Finland to aid the White faction. Westfalen was assigned as the flagship for a squadron that was to support a German expeditionary force deployed to Finland. The naval unit, commanded by Konteradmiral Hugo Meurer, was assigned three tasks: to seize the island of Åland for use as a forward operating base; transfer the army's Baltic Sea Division to Finland; and to support army operations along the Finnish coast. The squadron, which was named a Sonderverband (special unit), also included Rheinland, the minelaying cruiser Nautilus, III Sperrbrecher Group, the 9th Minesweeping Half-Flotilla, four torpedo boats, and a number of supporting vessels and transports.

On 23 February, the two battleships took on the 14th Jäger Battalion and a company of bicycle troops, and early on 24 February they departed for Åland. Sweden had previously granted permission for Germany to sail through Swedish territorial waters, but by this time had revoked the agreement, so the ship had to sail through international waters. Meuer initially intended to land the soldiers near Lemland, but the danger of mines and heavy sea ice forced him to move to Eckerö, despite Swedish objections. Sweden had already sent forces to the island, including a squadron that consisted of coastal defense ships Sverige, Thor, and Oscar II, and they were already in Eckerö when the Germans arrived. Negotiations ensued, which resulted in the landing of the German troops on Åland on 7 March; Westfalen then returned to Danzig, but Rheinland was left at Eckerö.

In Danzig, Meuer requested and received reinforcements, in the form of Posen, the coastal defense ship Beowulf, the light cruiser Kolberg, and several more auxiliaries. By that time, Germany and Russia had signed the Treaty of Brest-Litovsk, ending the fighting between the two countries. Westfalen remained in Danzig until 31 March, when she departed for Finland with Posen; the ships arrived at Russarö, which was the outer defense for Hanko, by 3 April. The fortress at Russarö was still under Russian control, and the garrison declared their neutrality, which allowed the Germans to go ashore without fighting. The German army quickly took the port, and the British submarines that had been based there were all scuttled by their crews. On 5 April, Meuer secured an agreement with the local Russian naval commander that his ships would not interfere in the German operations.

Helsinki (Swedish: Helsingfors) was the next major objective; Westfalen had sailed south to Reval to make preparations for the attack on the Finnish capital. The ship got underway on 11 April, and the following day, she and Posen passed the fortifications guarding Helsinki, and they were soon joined by Beowulf. The German ships sent men ashore to take control of the harbor and the Skatudden district, while the Baltic Division attacked the city from the land side. Westfalen and the other ships provided fire support while the German and White forces fought their way across the city. Five men from the ships' landing parties were killed in the fighting, but by 14 April, the Germans and White forces had taken control of Helsinki. Westfalen remained in Helsinki until 30 April, by which time the White government had been installed firmly in power. Upon leaving the city, Meuer handed control of the harbor facilities over to the White government.

Following the operation, Westfalen returned to the North Sea where she rejoined I Battle Squadron. On 11 August, Westfalen, Posen, Kaiser, and Kaiserin steamed out towards Terschelling to support German torpedo boat patrols in the area. While en route, Westfalen suffered serious damage to her boilers that reduced her speed to 16 kn (30 km/h; 18 mph). After returning to port, she was withdrawn from front-line service and employed as an artillery training ship with the Naval Artillery Inspectorate.

=== Fate ===
Following Germany's collapse in November 1918, a significant portion of the High Seas Fleet was interned in Scapa Flow under the terms of the Armistice. Westfalen and her three sisters—the oldest dreadnoughts in the German navy—were not among the ships listed for internment, so they remained in German ports. They had their guns disabled, along with the four Helgoland-class battleships. Under the terms of the Treaty of Versailles that formally ended the war in June 1919, Westfalen and the other dreadnoughts that had remained in Germany were to be surrendered to the Allies under Article 185. Negotiations between the Allies over which country received what vessels, and what those ships could be used for, began in November. Westfalen was struck from the German naval list on 5 November. While final decisions were still being made, the Allies decided that the ships in question were to sail to either a British or French port, and accordingly, on 31 July 1920, Westfalen, Helgoland, and twelve torpedo boats sailed for Rosyth, Britain, arriving on 5 August. By that time, Westfalen had been renamed "D". The ship was then sold to ship-breakers in Birkenhead, arriving there on 3 September 1921, where she was stripped of weapons and some equipment to lighten her. From there, she sailed to Barrow-in-Furness on 18 May 1922 to be broken up for scrap by 1924.
