= Nassau-class battleship =

Imperial German Navy ship class (1909–1919)

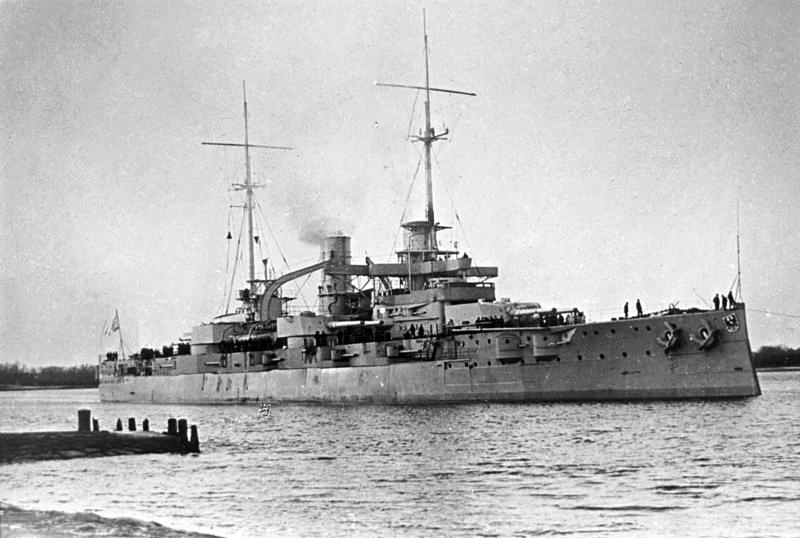
- SMS Rheinland in 1910

Class overview
- Name: Nassau
- Builders: AG Vulcan Stettin (1); AG Weser (1); Friedrich Krupp Germaniawerft (1); Kaiserliche Werft Wilhelmshaven (1)
- Operators: Imperial German Navy
- Preceded by: Deutschland class
- Succeeded by: Helgoland class
- Built: 1907–1910
- In commission: 1909–1919
- Completed: 4
- Scrapped: 4

General characteristics
- Type: Dreadnought battleship
- Displacement: Normal: 18,873 t (18,575 long tons); Full load: 21,000 t (21,000 long tons)
- Length: 146.1 m (479 ft 4 in)
- Beam: 26.9 m (88 ft 3 in)
- Draft: 8.76 m (28 ft 9 in)
- Installed power: 12 × water-tube boilers; 22,000 metric horsepower (22,000 ihp)
- Propulsion: 3 × triple-expansion steam engines; 3 × screw propellers
- Speed: Design: 19 knots (35 km/h; 22 mph); Maximum: 20.2 knots (37.4 km/h; 23.2 mph)
- Range: At 12 knots (22 km/h; 14 mph): 8,300 nmi (15,400 km; 9,600 mi)
- Complement: 40 officers; 968 men
- Armament: 12 × 28 cm (11 in) L/45 guns; 12 × 15 cm (5.9 in) SK L/45 guns; 16 × 8.8 cm (3.5 in) SK L/45 guns; 6 × 45 cm (17.7 in) torpedo tubes
- Armor: Belt: 30 cm (11.8 in); Turrets: 28 cm; Battery: 16 cm (6.3 in); Conning Tower: 40 cm (15.7 in); Torpedo bulkhead: 3 cm (1.2 in)

The Nassau class was a group of four dreadnought battleships built for the German Kaiserliche Marine (Imperial Navy) in the early 1900s. The class comprised Nassau, the lead ship, Westfalen, Rheinland, and Posen. All four ships were laid down in mid-1907, and completed by late 1910. They were Germany's first dreadnought class, and though commonly perceived as having been built in response to the British Dreadnought, their design traces its origin to 1903; they were in fact a response to Dreadnought's predecessors of the Lord Nelson class. The Nassaus adopted a main battery of twelve 28 cm (11 in) guns in six twin-gun turrets in an unusual hexagonal arrangement. Unlike many other dreadnoughts, the Nassau-class ships retained triple-expansion steam engines instead of more powerful steam turbines.

After entering service, the Nassau-class ships served as II Division, I Battle Squadron of the High Seas Fleet for the duration of their careers. From 1910 to 1914, the ships participated in the normal peacetime routine of the German fleet, including various squadron exercises, training cruises, and fleet maneuvers every August–September. Following the outbreak of World War I in July 1914, the ships took part in numerous fleet operations intended to isolate and destroy individual elements of the numerically superior British Grand Fleet. These frequently consisted of sailing as distant support to the battlecruisers of I Scouting Group as they raided British coastal towns. These operations culminated in the Battle of Jutland on 31 May – 1 June 1916, where the ships helped to sink the armored cruiser HMS Black Prince.

The ships also saw service in the Baltic Sea against the Russian Empire during the war; Nassau and Posen engaged the Russian pre-dreadnought Slava during the inconclusive Battle of the Gulf of Riga in 1915. Rheinland and Westfalen were sent to Finland to support White Finnish forces in the Finnish Civil War, though Rheinland ran aground and was badly damaged. Following Germany's defeat, all four ships were ceded as war prizes to the victorious Allied powers and broken up in the early 1920s.

== Design ==
=== Initial designs ===
Deutschland, the initial basis of the Nassau design

Though the Nassau class is commonly cited as a response to the revolutionary HMS Dreadnought, the decision to adopt an all-big-gun main battery predated the construction of the British vessel. Design work on what would eventually become the Nassau class began in 1903, with work scheduled to begin in 1906. Kaiser Wilhelm II argued that the navy ought to build large armored cruisers as a single capital ship type. In December 1903, Wilhelm II suggested a new ship, of about 13,300 metric tons (13,100 long tons) displacement, to be armed with four 28 cm (11 in) guns and eight 21 cm (8.3 in) guns. Speed was to be 18 knots (33 km/h; 21 mph). He requested the Construction Office submit proposals based on his ideas; by January 1904, three such designs had been prepared: "5A", "5B", and "6". The first two mounted eight 21 cm guns, in four single-gun turrets and four casemates for "5A" and in four twin-gun turrets in "5B". The "6" design carried ten of the guns in four casemates and the remaining six in a central battery. Though the naval command felt "5B" offered the best firing arcs, they forwarded the "6" design for further consideration. Evaluation of the design led to a conclusion that it offered no significant improvement over the preceding Deutschland-class battleships.

The Kaiser intervened again in February with a request for a 14,000 t (13,779 long tons) ship with secondary batteries of ten 21 cm or 24 cm (9.4 in) guns; the Construction Department and the Kaiserliche Werft (Imperial Shipyard) in Kiel submitted proposals. The first, "6B-D", was a variant on the earlier "6" design, while two others, "10A" and "10B" featured the larger guns; the submissions from Kiel have not survived and their details are not known. Wilhelm interrupted this design work by suggesting that speed should be increased significantly at the price of reducing the main battery to 24 cm guns, which resulted in further design studies that were completed by April. All of these were deemed unacceptable and further design work was carried out within the Reichsmarineamt (Imperial Naval Office). The officers there observed that the secondary battery should be limited to 21 cm guns, since the increased weight of the 24 cm weapons limited the number of guns. This resulted in "Project I", armed with twelve of the guns, "Project II", armed with sixteen of the guns, and "Project III", which carried eight 24 cm guns. All three variants kept a 28 cm main battery.

During deliberations in late April, "Project I" emerged as the favored design since it would be cheaper than "II" (which would also require widening of the Kaiser Wilhelm Canal). The design was refined into two versions, "IA" and "IB", with the former using casemates and the latter using single turrets. Wilhelm approved "IA" in May, though the arrangement of the secondary guns proved to be contentious, and in December another variant, "7D", which moved eight of the guns to twin turrets and adopted an improved underwater protection system was submitted, which the Kaiser approved on 7 January 1904. These plans were disrupted immediately when the Germans learned of the characteristics of the British Lord Nelson-class battleships, which carried a secondary battery of ten 9.2 in (230 mm) guns, and estimates of the next class of battleships, which were to carry an even more powerful armament. This meant that "7D" would be insufficient to counter the next generation of British battleships, and the design staff would have to start over.

=== All-big-gun proposals ===
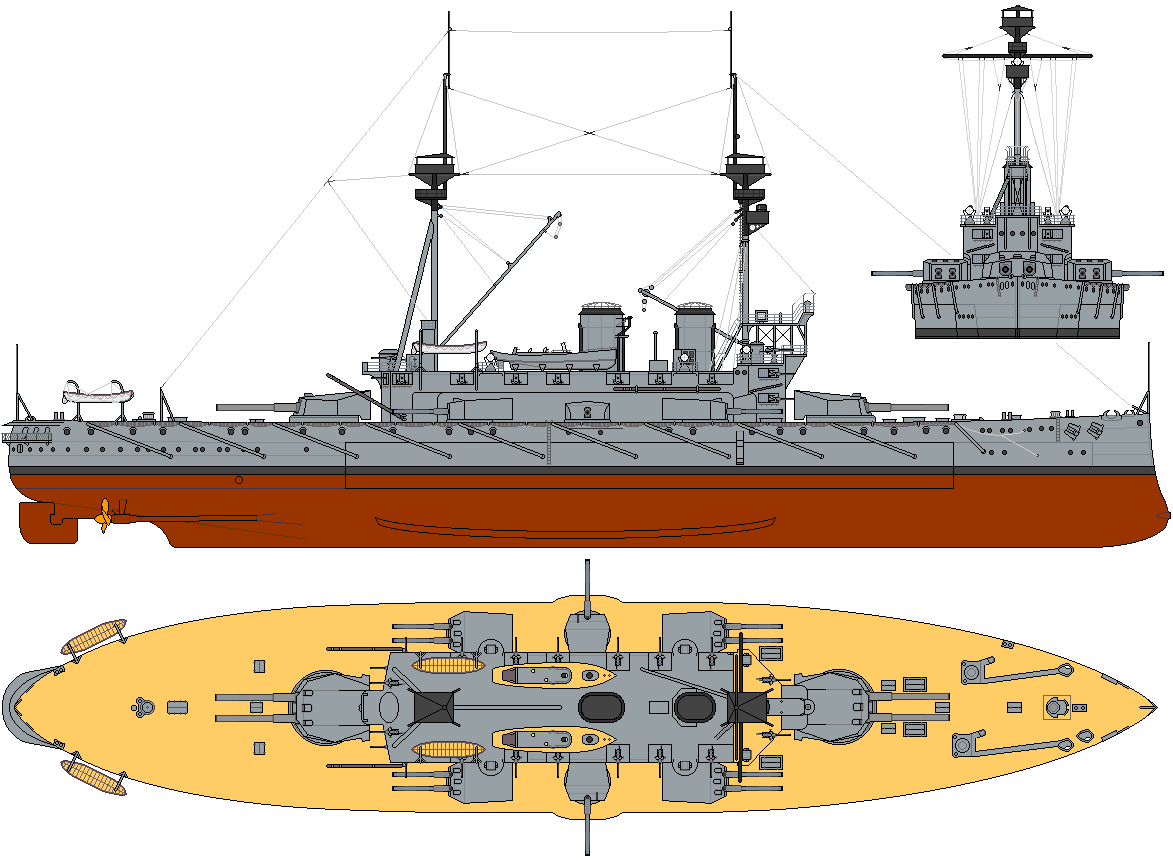
The British Lord Nelson design, which prompted the Germans to redesign their initial plans

Variants with six 21 cm twin-turrets were submitted, along with the first German all-big-gun battleships; these featured a battery of eight 28 cm guns, four in standard twin turrets and the rest in single-gun turrets. Wilhelm approved the all-big-gun version on 18 March 1905, after which further design refinement was carried out, which included increasing the beam, rearranging the secondary battery of eight 17 cm (6.7 in) guns, and improved turrets for the main battery guns. The Kaiser again attempted to meddle in the design process after he learned of the Italian Regina Elena-class battleships, which were capable of 22 knots (41 km/h; 25 mph); he pressed the navy to build a similar vessel, along the same lines as the type he had suggested in 1903. Admiral Alfred von Tirpitz pointed out that merging the battleship and armored cruiser categories would not be possible under the Naval Law of 1900, and that the Construction Office was too busy with other projects to take on another one.

During this period, Tirpitz worked to secure the passage of the next Naval Law; he had originally requested six new battleships and six armored cruisers, along with a number of miscellaneous smaller craft. As capital ship designs continued to grow in size and power, their cost spiraled upward. Opposition to budget increases in the Reichstag (Imperial Diet) forced Tirpitz to reduce his request to six armored cruisers—one of which was to have been placed in reserve—and 48 torpedo boats, dropping his request for new battleships completely; the reduced proposal was voted through on 19 May 1906 as the First Amendment to the Naval Law. A week after the amendment was passed, funds for two 18,000-ton battleships and a 15,000-ton armored cruiser were allocated to the Navy. Funds were also provided to widen the Kaiser Wilhelm Canal and enlarge dock facilities to accommodate the larger ships.

The design staff continued to refine the new ship, and by September 1905, several variants had been proposed, including "F", which replaced the four single-gun turrets with an equal number of twin-gun turrets. The 17 cm guns were also replaced with twelve 15 cm (5.9 in) guns on the basis that they offered a much higher rate of fire. An improved underwater protection system was adopted as well, resulting in the design finalized as "G", which was approved on 4 October. Internal rearrangements to the magazines and boiler rooms resulted in "G2", while an attempt to move all of the gun turrets to the broadside was presented as "G3", but this proved to be unworkable. "G2" was chosen for continued refinement, becoming "G7" and then "G7b", which the Kaiser approved on 3 March 1906. The initial arrangement with three funnels was altered to just two, and a new bow was incorporated, securing approval from the Kaiser on 14 April as "G7d". Construction of the first vessel was authorized on 31 May; another member was added shortly thereafter, with another two authorized for the 1907 construction program.

== Specifications ==
Nassau with some of her boats alongside

=== General characteristics ===
The ships were 146.1 m (479 ft 4 in) long, 26.9 m (88 ft 3 in) wide, and had a draught of 8.9 m (29 ft 2 in). The ships had a length to width ratio of 5.45, which was somewhat "stubby" compared to contemporary designs. To some extent, the greater than normal width was due to the four wing turrets, which necessitated a wider hull. They displaced 18,873 metric tons (18,575 long tons) with a standard load, and 20,535 t (20,211 long tons) fully laden. The ships had nineteen watertight compartments, with the exception of Nassau, which only had sixteen. All four ships had a double bottom for eighty-eight percent of the keel. Steering was controlled by a pair of rudders mounted side-by-side. The ships carried a number of boats, including a picket boat, three admiral's barges, two launches, two cutters, and two dinghies. The ships' standard crews numbered 40 officers and 968 enlisted men; while serving as squadron flagships, this was augmented by 13 officers and 66 enlisted men, and as divisional flagships, with 2 officers and 23 enlisted sailors.

As designed, the ships did not handle particularly well, even in calm seas, and their motion was quite stiff. The ships experienced severe rolling due to the weight of the wing turrets. The heavy wing turrets caused the ships to have a large metacentric height, which should have made them very stable gun platforms, but their roll period proved to coincide with that of the average North Sea swell. Bilge keels were later added, which helped to reduce the rolling problem. Despite the tendency to roll, the Nassau-class ships were maneuverable and had a small turning radius. They suffered minor speed loss in heavy seas, but up to 70 percent at hard rudder. The roll keels that had been fitted to improve handling caused a portion of the speed loss at hard rudder.

=== Propulsion ===
Plan and profile drawing of the Nassau class

The Imperial German Navy was slow to adopt the advanced Parsons turbine engines used in the British Dreadnought, primarily due to the resistance of both Tirpitz and the Navy's construction department. In 1905, the latter stated that the "use of turbines in heavy warships does not recommend itself." This decision was based solely on cost: at the time, Parsons held a monopoly on steam turbines and required a 1 million mark royalty fee for every turbine engine made. German firms were not ready to begin production of turbines on a large scale until 1910.

The Nassau class therefore retained three vertical, three-cylinder triple-expansion steam engines, each in its own engine room, with each driving a 3-bladed screw propeller that was 5 m (16 ft) in diameter. Steam for the engines was provided by twelve coal-fired, Schulz-Thornycroft water-tube boilers that were divided into three boiler rooms. The wing turrets and their magazines further divided the machinery into three separated groups, thereby increasing survivability. The boilers were ducted into a pair of funnels. The propulsion system was rated at 22,000 metric horsepower (22,000 ihp) for a top speed of 19 knots (35 km/h; 22 mph), though in service, all four ships exceeded these figures by a wide margin. Power output ranged from 26,244 to 28,117 metric horsepower (25,885 to 27,732 ihp), with top speeds of 20 to 20.2 knots (37.0 to 37.4 km/h; 23.0 to 23.2 mph). By comparison, Dreadnought's steam turbines provided a rated speed of 21 knots (39 km/h; 24 mph). Electrical power was provided by eight turbo-generators, producing 1,280 kW (1,720 hp) at 225 V.

The ships had a normal capacity of 950 t (930 long tons) of coal, though at full load they could carry up to 2,700 t (2,700 long tons). At a cruising speed of 10 knots (19 km/h; 12 mph), the ships could steam for 9,400 nautical miles (17,400 km; 10,800 mi); increasing speed to 12 knots (22 km/h; 14 mph) reduced their range to 8,300 nmi (15,400 km; 9,600 mi), and at 16 knots (30 km/h; 18 mph) their radius of action fell significantly, to 4,700 nmi (8,700 km; 5,400 mi). While steaming at 19 knots (35 km/h; 22 mph), the ships could steam for 2,800 nmi (5,200 km; 3,200 mi). In 1915, the boilers were fitted with supplementary oil firing, along with storage for 160 t (160 long tons) of fuel oil; this allowed oil to be sprayed on the coal to improve combustion rates. (Note: Due to the wartime situation, Germany had limited access to high quality coal, but was able to acquire lower-grade coal for its ships. The higher quality coal was generally reserved for the smaller craft, whose crews were less able to clean the boilers at the increased rate demanded by the low-quality coal. As a result, German capital ships were often supplied with poor coal, in the knowledge that their larger crews were better able to perform the increased maintenance. After 1915, the practice of spraying oil onto the low-quality coal was introduced, in order to increase the burn rate.)

=== Armament ===
A plan drawing of the Nassau class, showing the arrangement of the main battery

The vertical triple expansion engines consumed large amounts of internal space that could otherwise have been used for magazines. Without sufficient magazine capacity to support superfiring centerline turrets, designers were compelled to distribute six twin-gun turrets in an unusual hexagonal configuration. Two twin turrets were mounted fore and aft (one on each end), and two were mounted on each flank of the ship. Firing directly forward and aft, the ships could bring six guns to bear and eight on the broadside; this was the same theoretical capability as Dreadnought, but the Nassau-class ships required two additional guns to achieve it. The German designers considered that this arrangement provided a useful reserve of heavy guns that were shielded from enemy fire. While the arrangement was relatively common with semi-dreadnought battleships, the only other navy to adopt it for their dreadnoughts were the Japanese with their Kawachi-class battleships.

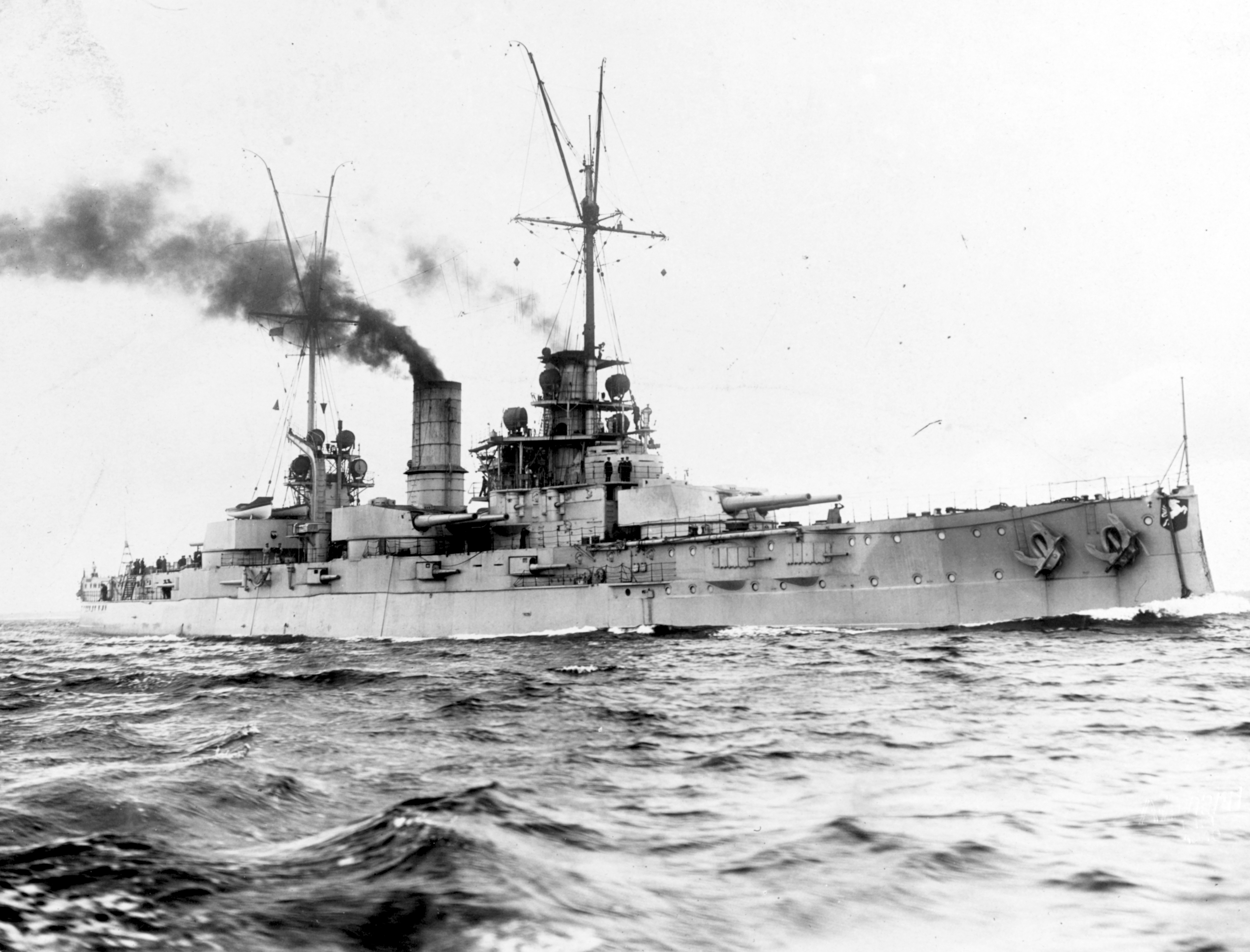
Westfalen underway, showing the arrangement of the main, secondary, and tertiary batteries

Each ship carried twelve 28 cm (11 in) SK L/45 guns. (Note: In Imperial German Navy gun nomenclature, "SK" (Schnelladekanone) denotes that the gun quick firing, while the L/45 denotes the length of the gun. In this case, the L/45 gun is 45 caliber, meaning that the gun is 45 times as long as it is in diameter.) The wing turrets were C/1906 mounts, as were the centerline turrets on the first two ships of the class, Nassau and Westfalen. Posen and Rheinland carried their centerline guns in C/1907 turrets, which had a longer trunk than the C/1906 design. The C/1906 turrets and 28 cm SK/L45 guns were designed specifically for the new German dreadnoughts in 1907. Both mountings allowed for elevation up to 20 degrees, but the C/1907 mounts could depress an additional two degrees, down to −8. The main battery propellant magazines were placed above shell rooms, with the exception of the centerline turrets of Nassau and Westfalen. These guns fired 666 lb shells, with a 24 kg (52.9 lb) fore propellant charge in silk bags and a 75 kg (165.3 lb) main charge in a brass case. The guns fired the shells at a muzzle velocity of 855 m/s (2,810 ft/s) and they had a maximum range of 20,500 m (67,300 ft).

The ships' secondary armament consisted of twelve 15 cm (5.9 in) SK L/45 guns, which were mounted individually in casemates. Six of these were placed on either side of the ship at main deck level on either broadside. These guns fired armor-piercing shells at a rate of 4 to 5 per minute. The guns could depress to −7 degrees and elevate to 20 degrees, for a maximum range of 13,500 m (14,800 yd). The shells weighed 51-kilogram (112 lb) and were fired at a muzzle velocity of 735 m/s (2,410 ft/s). The guns were manually elevated and trained.

For close-range defense against torpedo boats, the ships also carried sixteen 8.8 cm (3.5 in) SK L/45 guns, also in casemates. Four of these were in sponsons forward of the main battery, two on either side. Another four were in the forward superstructure, and the other four were in sponsons in the stern. These guns fired a 22-lb projectile at 2,133 ft/s (650 m/s), and could be trained up to 25 degrees for a maximum range of 10,500 yards (9,600 m). After 1915, two 8.8 cm guns were removed and replaced by two 8.8 cm Flak guns, and between 1916 and 1917, the remaining twelve 8.8 cm casemated guns were removed. These anti-aircraft guns fired a slightly lighter 21.2 lb shell at 2,510 ft/s (765 m/s). They could be elevated to 45 degrees and could hit targets 12,900 yards (11,800 m) away.

The Nassau-class ships were also armed with six 45 cm (17.7 in) submerged torpedo tubes. One tube was mounted in the bow, another in the stern, and two on each broadside, on either ends of the torpedo bulkhead. These were supplied with C/06D torpedoes; they had a range of 6,300 m (20,700 ft) with a speed of 26.5 knots (49.1 km/h; 30.5 mph), and they carried a 122.6 kg (270 lb) warhead. The bow tube could be trained thirty degrees to either side and the broadside tubes could be aimed thirty degrees forward and sixty degrees aft.

=== Armor ===
Cross-section amidships showing the armor layout

The Nassau-class ships were protected with Krupp cemented steel armor. The basic armor layout divided the ships into three sections: the bow, the stern, and the central citadel, the latter extending from the fore to the aft main battery barbette. The citadel consisted of the main section of belt armor, connected at either end by transverse armored bulkheads, and supported by a curved armor deck at mid-deck level. It protected the ships' vitals, including their propulsion machinery spaces and ammunition magazines. On either end of the citadel, the belt was considerably reduced in thickness and the deck was lowered to waterline level forward, though aft it remained at mid-deck level. The need for improved underwater protection had been demonstrated during the Russo-Japanese War of 1904–1905, during which several battleships of both sides had been badly damaged or sunk by naval mines and torpedoes; also of major importance was the severe damage to the battleship SMS Kaiser Friedrich III in 1901 after having struck an uncharted rock.

The main section of belt armor was 29 cm (11.5 in) for a height of 1.2 m (4 ft), increased to 30 cm (11.8 in) abreast the engine rooms, though it tapered to 17 cm (6.7 in) on the bottom edge, which was 1.60 m (5.25 ft) below the waterline. It also thinned at the top edge to 16 cm (6.3 in) at upper deck level. Toward the bow, it was reduced to 14 cm (5.5 in) and then to 10 cm (4 in). Aft of the citadel, the belt reduced to 13 cm (5 in) to 9 cm (3.5 in) before terminating at another transverse bulkhead that was also 9 cm thick. Behind the main belt was a torpedo bulkhead 3 cm (1.2 in) thick; there was some difficulty mounting the torpedo bulkhead, due to the four wing turrets and their barbettes, which took up considerable space close to the edge of the hull. The casemate battery, located directly above the central portion of the belt, was protected by a strake of armor that was 16 cm thick. This portion of the side armor was also capped on either end by a bulkhead that was 2 cm (0.8 in) thick.

The ships' main armor deck was 3.8 cm (1.5 in) thick in the central citadel, and the sides of the deck sloped downward to connect to the bottom edge of the belt. The sloped portion increased in thickness to 5.8 cm (2.3 in), and the resulting compartment created was used as a coal bunker, which would provide additional protection for the ships' interiors when the bunkers were full. Compartments on either side of the torpedo bulkhead, which were set back about 4 m (13 ft), were similarly used to store coal. In the bow and stern sections, the deck was thickened to 5.6 cm (2.2 in); it was increased further to 8.1 cm (3.2 in) over the steering compartment. The forecastle deck was 2.5 to 3.0 cm (1 to 1.2 in) over the secondary battery and 2 to 3 cm above the torpedo bulkhead.

The forward conning tower had a roof that was 8 cm (3.1 in) thick; the sides were 30 cm thick. Atop the conning tower was the smaller gunnery control tower, which had a curved face that was 40 cm (15.7 in) thick. The aft conning tower was less well protected, with a 5 cm (2 in) thick roof and 20 cm (7.9 in) sides. The main battery turrets had 28 cm thick faces, 22 cm (8.7 in) sides, and 26 cm (10.25 in) rear plates to balance the turrets. Their roofs consisted of two parts: a sloped front section that was 9 cm and a flat rear section that was 6.1 cm (2.4 in) thick. The casemated secondary battery was protected by the upper belt and had 8 cm thick gun shields; each gun was divided by a 2 cm transverse screen to prevent shell fragments that might hit one gun from entering the adjacent casemate. The ships were also fitted with anti-torpedo nets, but these were removed after 1916.

== Construction ==
Nassau underway, probably before World War I

Construction data
Ship	Contract name	Builder	laid down	Launched	Commissioned
Nassau	Ersatz Bayern	Kaiserliche Werft, Wilhelmshaven	22 July 1907	7 March 1908	1 October 1909
Westfalen	Ersatz Sachsen	AG Weser, Bremen	12 August 1907	1 July 1908	16 November 1909
Rheinland	Ersatz Baden	AG Vulcan, Stettin	1 June 1907	26 September 1908	30 April 1910
Posen	Ersatz Württemberg	Germaniawerft, Kiel	11 June 1907	12 December 1908	31 May 1910

== Service history ==
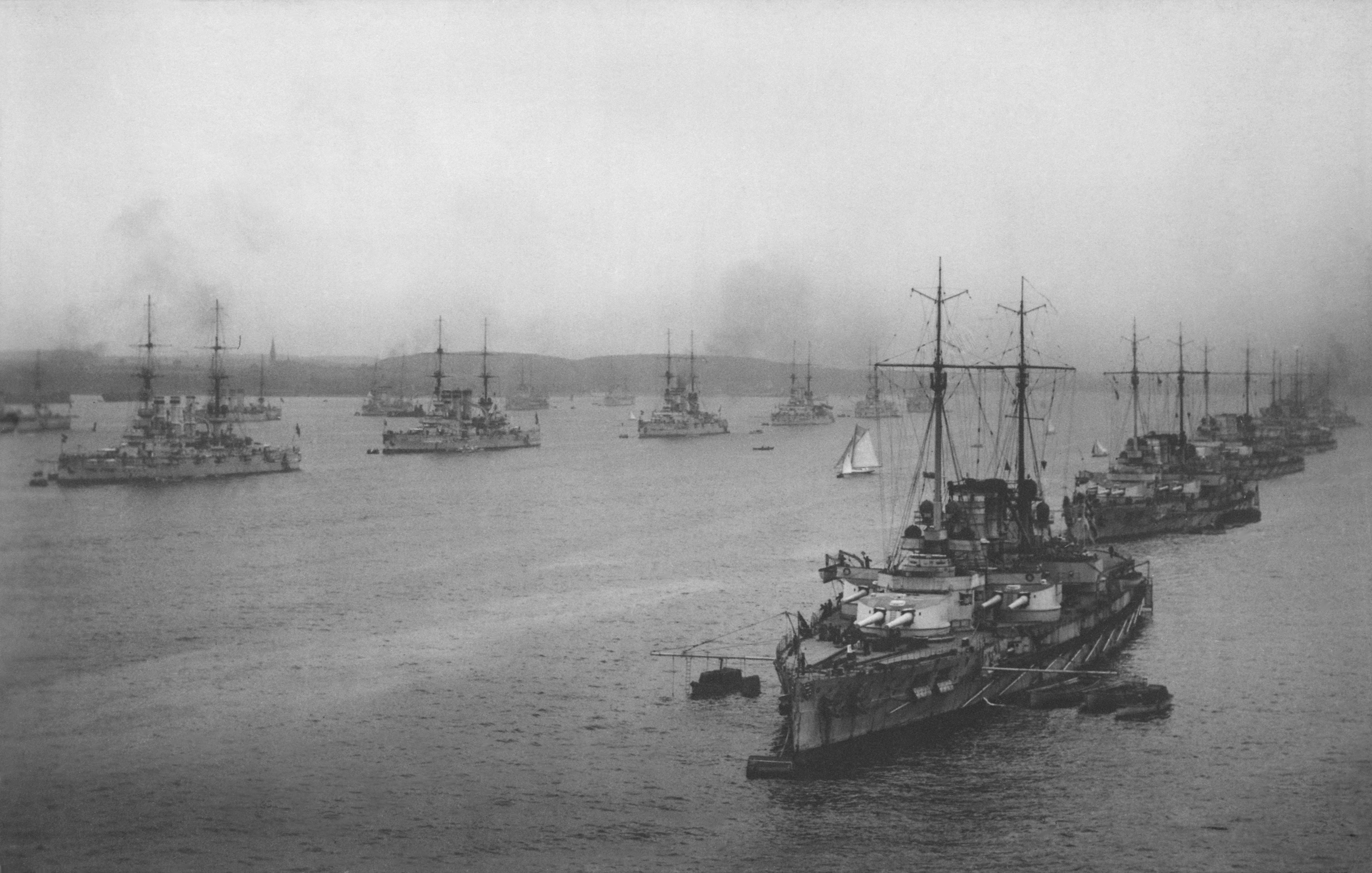
The four Nassau class ships (bottom right) with the rest of I Battle Squadron and II Battle Squadron before the outbreak of war

=== Pre-war service ===
After entering service in early 1910, Nassau and Westfalen joined I Battle Squadron, with the latter serving as the flagship. Later that year, they were joined by Posen and Rheinland as they were commissioned for service. Over the next four years, the ships took part in a routine of squadron and fleet maneuvers, gunnery practice, and training cruises. Each year typically culminated in a summer training cruise in July, frequently to Norwegian waters, followed by the annual fleet maneuvers held in late August and early September. The one exception to this was 1912, when the summer training cruise remained in the Baltic Sea owing to increased tensions with Britain and France as a result of the Agadir Crisis. The ships were in Norway during the July Crisis in 1914 and were hastily recalled to begin the mobilization for war when it became apparent that conflict between Austria-Hungary and Serbia would not be avoided.

=== World War I ===
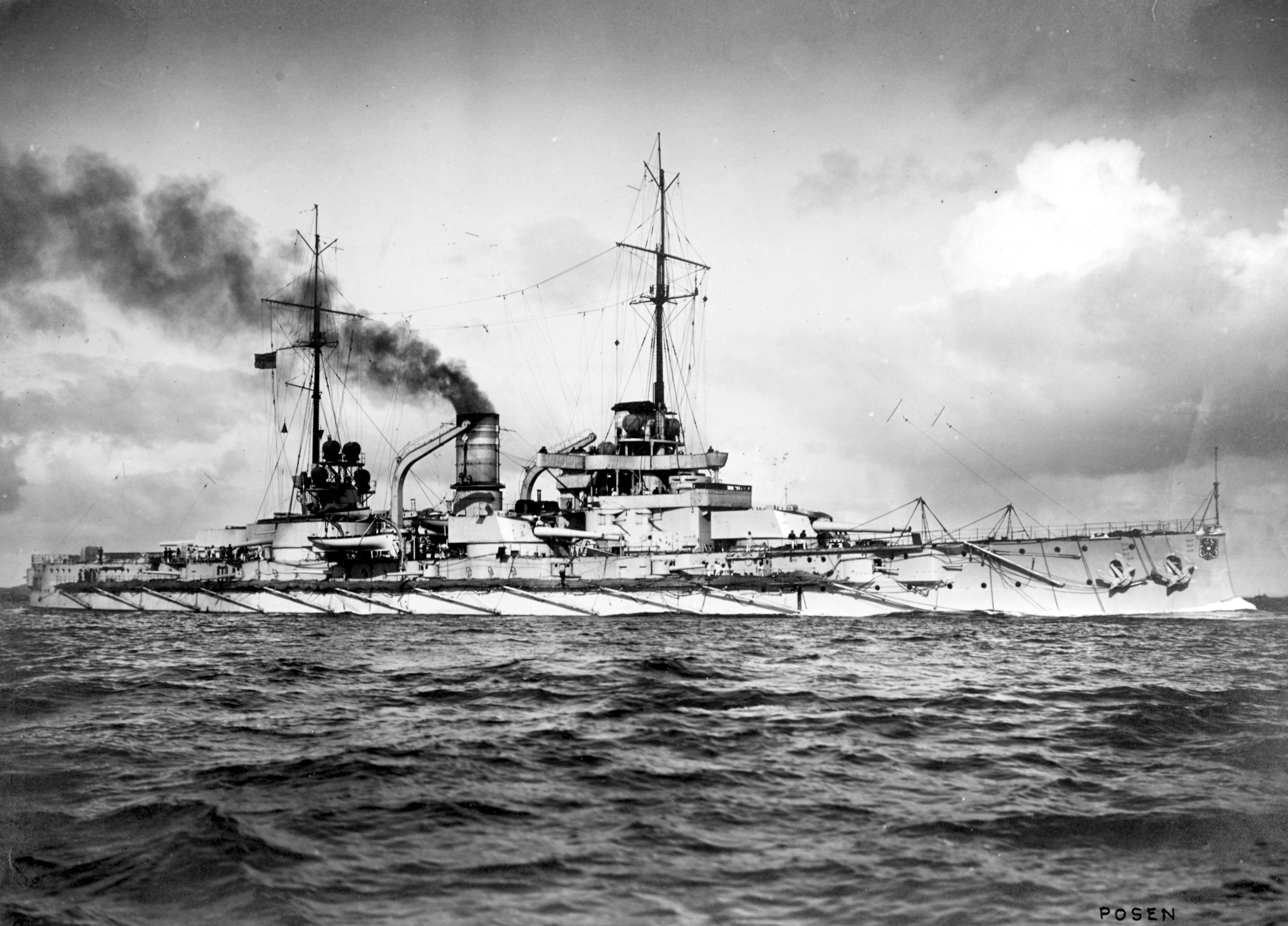
Posen at sea, c. 1911

After the start of the war, the German fleet embarked on a campaign of raids of the British coast intended to draw out portions of the British Grand Fleet or force the British to disperse their forces to stop the raids. The High Seas Fleet would then be able to concentrate its own ships to destroy isolated elements, thereby reducing the numerical superiority of the British fleet. The first of these was the raid on Yarmouth on 2–3 November 1914, which was conducted by the battlecruisers of Konteradmiral (KAdm—Rear Admiral) Franz von Hipper's I Scouting Group while the battleships provided distant support. The operation failed to locate any significant British forces. It was followed by the raid on Scarborough, Hartlepool, and Whitby on 15–16 December. During the night, the fleet destroyer screen encountered British warships—a squadron of six battleships and their escorts—but the German commander, Vizeadmiral (VAdm—Vice Admiral) Friedrich von Ingenohl believed he was confronting the entire Grand Fleet and disengaged. The Nassaus and the rest of the fleet got underway to relieve the battlecruisers after they were ambushed in the Battle of Dogger Bank on 24 January 1915, but they arrived too late to intervene. The fleet conducted several sweeps in to the North Sea to try to locate British patrols in March, April, and May but did not encounter any.

In August, I Battle Squadron and three battlecruisers were detached from the fleet to temporarily reinforce the German fleet in the Baltic Sea. The Germans planned to clear the Gulf of Riga to facilitate the capture of the city by the Imperial German Army. The Russian Baltic Fleet had stationed the pre-dreadnought Slava and a number of gunboats and destroyers in the gulf, the entrances to which were protected by a series of minefields. The first attempt during the Battle of the Gulf of Riga to breach the minefields and enter the gulf on 8 August was unsuccessful as it had taken too long to clear the Russian minefields to allow the minelayer Deutschland to lay a minefield of her own. They made another attempt beginning on 16 August, led by Nassau and Posen, along with four light cruisers and thirty-one torpedo boats. A minesweeper and destroyer were sunk that day, and the next day Nassau and Posen engaged in an artillery duel with Slava, forcing her to withdraw after scoring three hits. The remaining minesweepers cleared a path into the gulf, but reports of Allied submarines prompted a German withdrawal. The ships then returned to the High Seas Fleet in the North Sea.

After returning to the North Sea, the fleet conducted another sortie in the hope of catching a British squadron in October, with further operations beginning in March 1916, now under the direction of VAdm Reinhard Scheer. These operations included the attack on Yarmouth and Lowestoft in April. Unknown to the Germans, the British were aware of their intentions before embarking on these raids; the German light cruiser Magdeburg had run aground in the Baltic in August 1914, and Russian forces had salvaged German code books from the wreck and passed a copy to their British allies. With the ability to decode German wireless signals, they could send forces to attack the High Seas Fleet under conditions favorable to themselves, as they had done at Dogger Bank. This led to the Battle of Jutland on 31 May, when the British sought to catch the German fleet far enough away from port that it could be cut off and destroyed.

==== Battle of Jutland ====
Maps showing the maneuvers of the British (blue) and German (red) fleets on 31 May – 1 June 1916

The German fleet sortied in the early hours of 31 May, intending to make a demonstration with Hipper's battlecruisers to draw out his British counterparts of the Battle Cruiser Fleet. The British, aware of Scheer's plans, were already at sea, having left their base at Scapa Flow late on 30 May. The four Nassaus and the rest of I Battle Squadron formed the center of the German line of battle, astern of KAdm Paul Behncke's III Battle Squadron and ahead of the old pre-dreadnoughts of KAdm Franz Mauve's II Battle Squadron. Posen served as the flagship of II Division under KAdm Walter Engelhardt. The initial phase of the action, which began at 16:00 on 31 May, consisted of a running battle between the opposing battlecruiser squadrons as Hipper lured the British commander, Vice Admiral David Beatty, south toward Scheer's fleet. Upon spotting the German fleet, Beatty turned north, leading the Germans toward the approaching Grand Fleet under Admiral John Jellicoe.

As the fleets converged close to 18:00, the German battleships, including the Nassaus, engaged British light cruisers and destroyers, with Posen contributing to the destruction of the destroyer Nestor. By 18:30, the Grand Fleet had arrived on the scene, and was deployed into a position that would cross Scheer's "T" from the northeast. To extricate his fleet from this precarious position, Scheer ordered a 16-point turn to the south-west. At 18:55, Scheer decided to conduct another 16-point turn to launch an attack on the British fleet but was quickly forced to break off and withdraw. The Germans then maneuvered to disengage from the Grand Fleet and return to port; as darkness fell, the High Seas Fleet attempted to pass astern of the Grand Fleet as the latter steamed south, before turning south themselves to reach Wilhelmshaven. At around 21:20, lookouts aboard Posen spotted a group of British battlecruisers and she opened fire, scoring a hit on Princess Royal and straddling Indomitable, though her sisters could not make out targets and held their fire. Shortly thereafter, Nassau and Westfalen engaged British light cruisers and forced them to withdraw.

At around midnight on 1 June, Nassau came in contact with the British destroyer Spitfire, and in the confusion, attempted to ram her. Spitfire tried to evade, but could not maneuver away fast enough, and the two ships collided. Nassau fired her forward 11-inch guns at the destroyer, but they could not depress low enough for Nassau to be able to score a hit. Nonetheless, the blast from the guns destroyed Spitfire's bridge. At that point, Spitfire was able to disengage from Nassau, and took with her a 20-foot (6 m) portion of Nassau's side plating. The collision disabled one of her 5.9-inch guns, and left an 11.5-foot (3.5 m) gash above the waterline; this slowed the ship to 15 knots until it could be repaired. At approximately the same time, Posen accidentally rammed the light cruiser Elbing and holed her below the waterline. Elbing was damaged so severely that her engine room was completely flooded and she was unable to move; the captain of the ship ordered Elbing be scuttled to prevent her capture by the British.

Shortly after 01:00, Nassau and Thüringen encountered the British armored cruiser Black Prince. Thüringen opened fire first, and pummeled Black Prince with a total of 27 large-caliber shells and 24 shells from her secondary battery. Nassau and Ostfriesland joined in, followed by Friedrich der Grosse; the combined weight of fire destroyed Black Prince in a tremendous explosion. The wreck of the ship was directly in the path of Nassau; to avoid it, the ship had to steer sharply towards III Battle Squadron. It was necessary for the ship to steam at full speed astern in order to avoid a collision with Kaiserin. Nassau then fell back into a position between the pre-dreadnoughts Hessen and Hannover. Following the return to German waters, Nassau, Posen, and Westfalen, along with the Helgoland-class battleships Helgoland and Thüringen, took up defensive positions in the Jade roadstead for the night, while Rheinland refueled and rearmed. The Nassau-class ships suffered only a handful of secondary battery hits from the opposing Grand Fleet; Nassau was hit twice, Westfalen and Rheinland each once, and Posen escaped completely unscathed. Not a single ship of the four was struck by a heavy-caliber shell.

==== Later operations ====
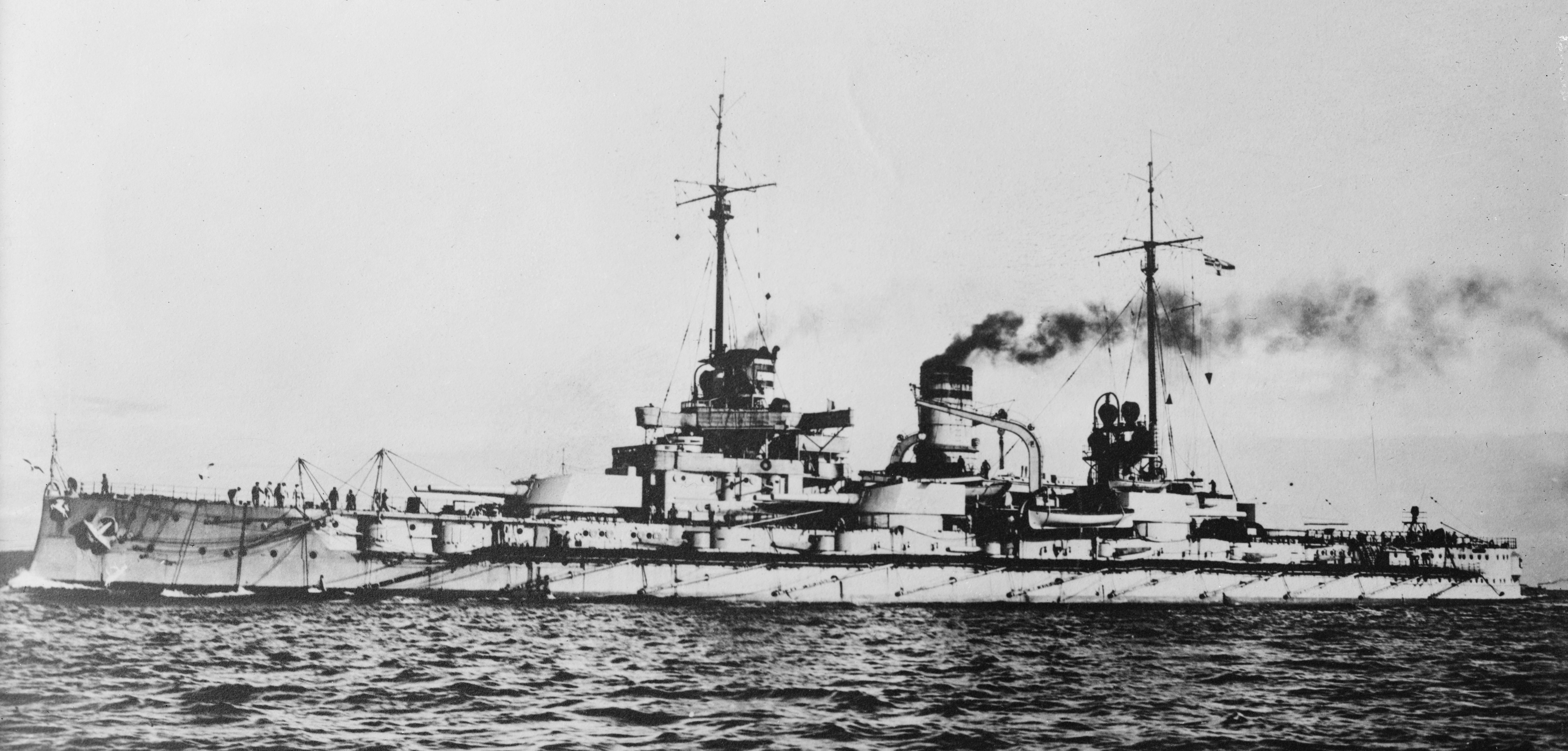
Westfalen underway prior to 1917

Less than three months after Jutland, Scheer embarked on another operation in the North Sea; in the resulting action of 19 August 1916, Westfalen was torpedoed by the British submarine HMS E23, but suffered minimal damage and was soon repaired. Further operations took place in September and October, though the fleet saw little activity in 1917. While the bulk of the fleet conducted Operation Albion in the Gulf of Riga in October 1917, the four Nassaus patrolled the eastern Baltic to block a potential British incursion to support Russia. In February 1918, Westfalen and Rheinland were detached from the High Seas Fleet and ordered into the Baltic Sea. A civil war had broken out in the newly independent Finland between the German-aligned Whites and Russia-aligned Reds, and the two ships were to aid the Whites. Posen joined them there in early April. On 11 April, Rheinland ran aground off Åland. Approximately 6,000 tons of guns, belt armor, and coal were removed in order to lighten her enough to be refloated, which was not accomplished until 9 July. Rheinland was never repaired, and instead saw the remainder of her service as a barracks ship in Kiel. Westfalen and Posen participated in the Battle of Helsinki, transporting German troops and providing artillery support.

In late 1917, German light forces had begun raiding British convoys to Norway, prompting the British to send heavy escorts. This provided the German fleet with the opportunity for which it had been waiting the entire war: a chance to destroy an isolated portion of the Grand Fleet. The Germans had mistaken intelligence about the timing of the convoys, however, and failed to intercept one when they sortied in April 1918; Nassau was the only member of the class to take part in the operation. While returning from Finland in August, Westfalen was removed from active service for use as a gunnery training ship. The fleet saw little activity in the final months of the war and morale plummeted, leading to the Wilhelmshaven mutiny when it became clear that Scheer and Hipper intended to mount a last-ditch attack on the Grand Fleet in the last days of the war.

Following the end of the First World War in 1918, eleven battleships of the König, Kaiser, and Bayern classes and all five battlecruisers, along with a number of light cruisers and destroyers, were interned in Scapa Flow, while their fate was determined in the negotiations over the Treaty of Versailles. The Nassau and Helgoland-class battleships were left in Germany, though when the treaty was signed in 1919, they were listed as war prizes to be surrendered to the Allies. All of the ships save Rheinland, which was in too poor a condition, were transferred to Rosyth, Britain, to be divided between the Allies. Nassau was ceded to Japan, Britain received Westfalen and Posen, and Rheinland was sold directly to the breakers at Dordrecht. Between 1920 and 1924, Westfalen was scrapped at Birkenhead and the remaining ships were scrapped at Dordrecht.
