= Soviet destroyer Moskva =

Soviet Leningrad-class destroyer leaders

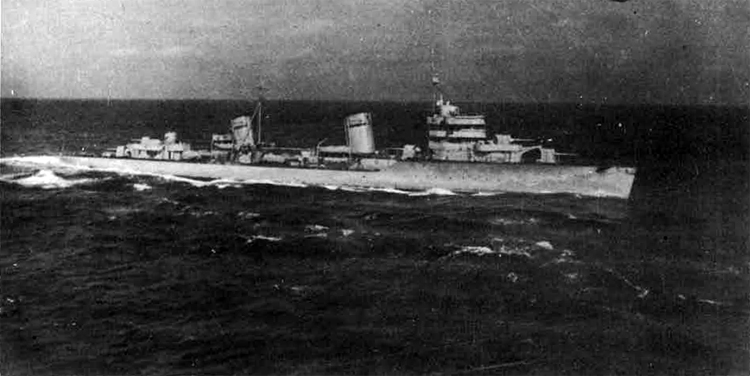
- Moskva at sea

History

Soviet Union
- Name: Moskva
- Namesake: Moscow
- Ordered: 1st Five-Year Plan
- Builder: Shipyard No. 198 (Marti South), Nikolayev
- Yard number: 224
- Laid down: 29 October 1932
- Launched: 30 October 1934
- Commissioned: 10 August 1938
- Fate: Sunk by mine, 26 June 1941; 44°04.033′N 028°57.145′E

General characteristics (as built)
- Class & type: Leningrad-class destroyer leader
- Displacement: 2,150 long tons (2,180 t) (standard); 2,582 long tons (2,623 t) (full load)
- Length: 127.5 m (418 ft 4 in) (o/a)
- Beam: 11.7 m (38 ft 5 in)
- Draft: 4.06 m (13 ft 4 in)
- Installed power: 3 Three-drum boilers; 66,000 shp (49,000 kW)
- Propulsion: 3 shafts; 3 geared steam turbines
- Speed: 40 knots (74 km/h; 46 mph)
- Range: 2,100 nmi (3,900 km; 2,400 mi) at 20 knots (37 km/h; 23 mph)
- Complement: 250 (311 wartime)
- Sensors & processing systems: Arktur hydrophones
- Armament: 5 × single 130 mm (5.1 in) guns; 2 × single 76.2 mm (3 in) AA guns; 2 × single 45 mm (1.8 in) AA guns; 2 × quadruple 533 mm (21 in) torpedo tubes; 68–115 mines; 52 depth charges

Moskva (Russian: Москва́) was one of six Leningrad-class destroyer leaders built for the Soviet Navy during the 1930s, one of the three Project 1 variants. Completed in 1938 and assigned to the Black Sea Fleet, she participated in the Raid on Constanța on 26 June 1941, a few days after the beginning of the German invasion of the Soviet Union. After the ship had finished bombarding targets in the port, she was sunk by a mine.

== Design and description ==
Impressed by the French large destroyer (contre-torpilleur) designs such as the Vauquelin class of the early 1930s, the Soviets designed their own version. The Leningrads had an overall length of 127.5 meters (418 ft 4 in) and were 122 meters (400 ft 3 in) long at the waterline. The ships had a beam of 11.7 meters (38 ft 5 in), and a draft of 4.06 meters (13 ft 4 in) at deep load. Built in two batches, the first batch (Project 1) displaced 2,150 long tons (2,180 t) at standard load and 2,582 long tons (2,623 t) at deep load. Their crew numbered 250 officers and sailors in peacetime and 311 in wartime. The ships had three geared steam turbines, each driving one propeller, designed to produce 66,000 shaft horsepower (49,000 kW) using steam from three three-drum boilers which was intended to give them a maximum speed of 40 knots (74 km/h; 46 mph). The Leningrads carried enough fuel oil to give them a range of 2,100 nautical miles (3,900 km; 2,400 mi) at 20 knots (37 km/h; 23 mph).

As built, the Leningrad-class ships mounted five 130-millimeter (5.1 in) B-13 guns in two pairs of superfiring single mounts fore and aft of the superstructure and another mount between the bridge and the forward funnel. The guns were protected by gun shields. Anti-aircraft defense was provided by a pair of 76.2-millimeter (3 in) 34-K AA guns in single mounts on the aft superstructure and a pair of 45-millimeter (1.8 in) 21-K AA guns mounted on either side of the bridge as well as a dozen 12.7-millimeter (0.50 in) M2 Browning machine guns in six twin mounts. They carried eight 533 mm (21.0 in) torpedo tubes in two rotating quadruple mounts; each tube was provided with a reload. The ships could also carry a maximum of either 68 or 115 mines and 52 depth charges. They were fitted with a set of Arktur hydrophones for anti-submarine detection.

== Construction and career ==
Moskva, named after the capital of the Russian Soviet Federative Socialist Republic, was laid down on 29 October 1932 at Shipyard No. 198 (Marti South) in Nikolayev as yard number 224, and launched on 30 October 1934. She was towed to Shipyard No. 201 in Sevastopol for completion, and reached 43 knots (80 km/h; 49 mph) in sea trials during April 1938. Commissioned on 10 August of that year, she was assigned to the 3rd Division of the Light Forces Detachment of the Black Sea Fleet three days earlier. On 16 November she left for Istanbul to participate in the funeral of Turkish President Mustafa Kemal Atatürk, arriving there a day later. While in Turkey, 40 officers and sailors traveled to Ankara to lay a wreath before the destroyer leader departed Istanbul on 25 November, returning to Sevastopol three days later after exercises in the Black Sea. Moskva transported Turkish Minister of Foreign Affairs Şükrü Saracoğlu back to Istanbul between 19 and 20 October 1939, visiting the port with the destroyer Besposhchadny until 23 October.

She was included with the Light Forces Detachment in a squadron of ships intended to participate in engagements with enemy fleets formed by the Black Sea Fleet in May 1940, leading one of the two destroyer divisions of the Light Forces Detachment, which was capable of independent operations. Late that year, she participated in joint maneuvers with the Transcaucasian Military District in the eastern Black Sea. Kapitan-leytenant (Captain lieutenant) Alexander Tukhov took command of the ship in February 1941. In the event of a Romanian attack on the Soviet Union, Moskva, as part of the Black Sea Fleet squadron, was to destroy or capture the Romanian fleet and cut communications, blockade the Romanian coast, support a potential amphibious landing and Soviet troops advancing along the Black Sea coast. To practice this plan, she participated in exercises with the Red Army's 9th Special Rifle Corps between 4 and 19 June, supporting a mock amphibious landing on the west coast of Crimea, near Tendra.

=== Raid on Constanța ===
Following the beginning of Operation Barbarossa, the German invasion of the Soviet Union, the squadron of the Black Sea Fleet was tasked with disrupting Axis supply lines by bombarding the Romanian port of Constanța and its oil tanks. The time of the bombardment was set for 05:00 on 26 June, to be preceded by a 30-minute airstrike by aircraft of the fleet beginning an hour earlier. For the raid, the heavy cruiser Voroshilov and Moskva were to cover the bombardment of the port by the latter's sister ship Kharkov and the destroyers Soobrazitelny and Smyshleny. To prevent Axis air attack, the ships began to depart Sevastopol at night, at 18:00 on 25 June. However, before exiting the bay, the ships were ordered back to port because the plan was changed by the People's Commissar for the Navy, Vitse-admiral (Vice Admiral) Nikolay Kuznetsov, who ordered that the two destroyer leaders conduct the bombardment, with the other ships in support. Moskva and Kharkov departed Sevastopol Bay at 20:10, initially heading towards Odessa as a deception measure and then turning towards their destination slightly more than an hour later, followed by the support group.

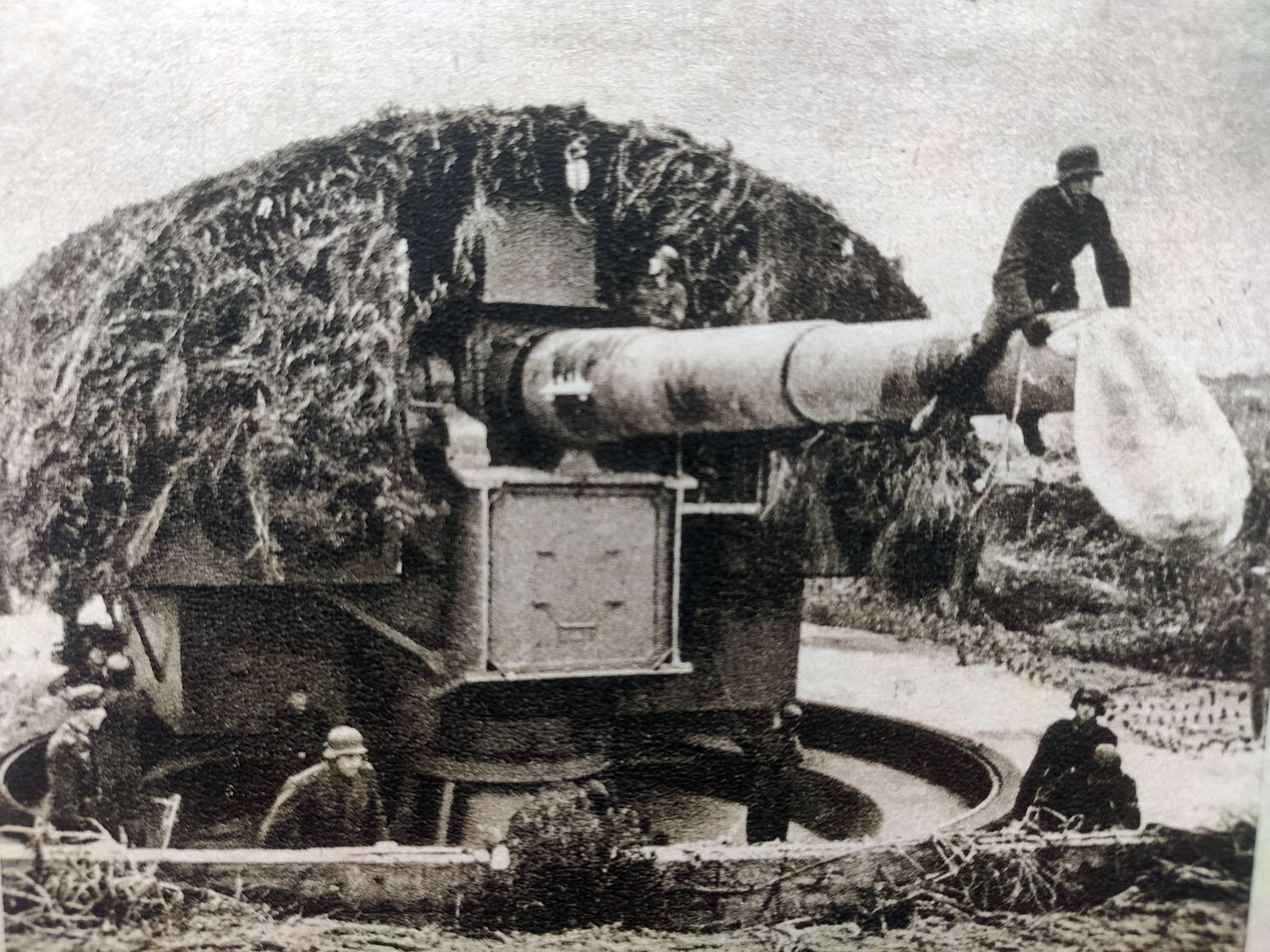
Moskva marked on the barrel of a 28 cm gun of the Tirpitz battery

On the morning of 26 June, Moskva and Kharkov bombarded the port as scheduled, although the airstrike was not carried out. The former contributed 196 out of the 350 rounds fired between them at oil tanks and railway stations from a range of about 20 km (12 mi), blowing up an ammunition train and inflicting considerable damage. As they were preparing to depart after having fired for 10 minutes, they were engaged by German coastal artillery and the Romanian destroyers Regina Maria and Mărăști at ranges between 11,000 to 16,000 m (12,000 to 17,000 yd). Silhouetted against the dawn, the Axis fire soon bracketed Moskva and hit her mainmast. Shortly afterwards, she struck a mine, probably laid by the Romanians on 16–19 June, which broke the ship in half; prior to the raid, the ships conducting it were not given precise charts of minefield locations. Moskva sank quickly, but German Heinkel He 59 floatplanes and Romanian motor torpedo boats were able to rescue 69 survivors, including seven officers. (Note: Rohwer attributes the sinking to a friendly fire attack by the Shchuka-class submarine Soviet submarine Shch-206, but in 2001 Hervieux noted that the latest post-Cold War information stated that the submarine attacked, and missed, Kharkov and Soobrazitelnyy later that morning in two separate incidents.) Among those captured was Tukhov, who was reported by Soviet accounts to have later escaped and been killed while fighting as a partisan.

In 2011, the wreck of Moskva was discovered by Romanian divers at a depth of 40 meters (130 ft) 20 kilometers (12 mi) from Constanța.

== Bibliography ==
- Breyer, Siegfried (1992). Soviet Warship Development: Volume 1: 1917–1937. London: Conway Maritime Press. ISBN 0-85177-604-3.
- Budzbon, Przemysław (1980). "Soviet Union". In Chesneau, Roger (ed.). Conway's All the World's Fighting Ships 1922–1946. Greenwich, UK: Conway Maritime Press. pp. 318–346. ISBN 0-85177-146-7.
- Budzbon, Przemysław; Radziemski, Jan & Twardowski, Marek (2022). Warships of the Soviet Fleets 1939–1945. Vol. I: Major Combatants. Annapolis, Maryland: Naval Institute Press. ISBN 978-1-68247-877-6.
- Hervieux, Pierre (2001). "The Romanian Navy at War, 1941–1945". In Preston, Antony (ed.). Warship 2001–2002. London: Conway Maritime Press. pp. 70–88. ISBN 0-85177-901-8.
- Hill, Alexander (2018). Soviet Destroyers of World War II. New Vanguard. Vol. 256. Oxford, UK: Osprey Publishing. ISBN 978-1-4728-2256-7.
- Kachur, Pavel (2008). "Гончие псы" Красного флота. "Ташкент", "Баку", "Ленинград" [Hounds of the Red Fleet: Tashkent, Baku, Leningrad] (in Russian). Moscow: Yauza/Eksmo. ISBN 978-5-699-31614-4.
- Komoedov, V.P., ed. (2002). Черноморский флот России: Исторический очерк [Black Sea Fleet of Russia: Historical Essay] (in Russian). Simferopol: Tavrida. ISBN 966-584-194-7.
- Rohwer, Jürgen (2005). Chronology of the War at Sea 1939–1945: The Naval History of World War Two (Third Revised ed.). Annapolis, Maryland: Naval Institute Press. ISBN 1-59114-119-2.
- Rohwer, Jürgen & Monakov, Mikhail S. (2001). Stalin's Ocean-Going Fleet. London: Frank Cass. ISBN 0-7146-4895-7.
