= Romanian Fortifications of Constanța =

Romanian fortifications in southeastern Romania

A Romanian bunker south of Costinești

The Romanian Fortifications of Constanța span decades, from the 1920s through World War II. Constanța is a coastal city in eastern Romania, and is Romania's chief naval base. Since it is Romania's main naval base, it was fortified, both with land and naval fortifications.

== Elisabetha Battery ==
The Elisabetha Battery was built in 1926, and was armed with 12 cm St. Chamond naval guns. The St. Chamond 12 cm guns were taken from the NMS Elisabeta, which was retired in 1926, after a service of nearly 50 years. The battery is located south part of Constanța. 4 concrete positions were created for the guns, which were left out in the open in barbette positions. The shells were stored beneath the guns and were accessed via a concrete staircase in front of the gun. A shell elevator raised the shells up to the gun, and the shell storage rooms were very large. Facing anyone who came down the stairs was a machine gun embrasure designed to protect the rest of the underground complex. A tall tower was built for spotting and fire control, and was equipped with a rangefinder. Alongside the tower is the command building.

The Elisabetha Battery was only involved in 1 engagement during World War II, which occurred in late June 1941. The Soviet ships, the 2 destoyers Kharkov and Moskva, sortied from Sevastopol late on June 25, 1941, to test the harbor defenses of Constanța. The Soviet ships fired from about 10 mi away, and the guns of the Elisabetha Battery's 12 cm guns didn't have the range to hit them. However, the fire control tower was able to provide accurate spotting for the German battery Tirpitz, which its 28 cm guns could hit the ships. The ship was silhouetted against the morning sky, making German gunnery easier. German artillery fire was accurate, and the Moskva was hit in the center of the ship, and began to withdraw with Kharkov. The ship could still make port with the damage sustained, but struck a Romanian naval mine, broke in half, and sank quickly. For the rest of the war, the guns didn't fire a shot. The guns were later used by the Soviet government to defend the port.

== Machine gun bunkers of Constanța Harbor ==
Located on a breakwater that stretches out into the sea are 3 machine gun bunkers alongside 3 supporting bunkers. The MG and supporting bunkers were paired up, with the support bunker doing the spotting. The 6 bunkers surround a gothic-looking abandoned casino, and are located behind large concrete tetra pods. The bunkers are a variation of a Czech design and are fitted to be armed with a Czech heavy machine gun. Each of the support bunkers was equipped with a periscope on a triangular base for observation.

== Anti-invasion bunkers south of Constanța ==
An old Romanian bunker is slowly consumed by the sea near Costinești

About 20 mi south of Constanța, near the town of Costinești, are several hexagonal concrete bunkers meant to stop an amphibious landing. They are located on a beach a few hundred meters north of the town, and are partially underwater now. Each bunker was equipped with a periscope and was armed with a Czech-made ZB vz. 37 medium machine gun.
