= Heavy artillery in the Royal Romanian Armed Forces =

Throughout the existence of the Kingdom of Romania, its Army and Navy employed numerous pieces of heavy artillery (150 mm or greater).

== Army ==
=== World War I ===
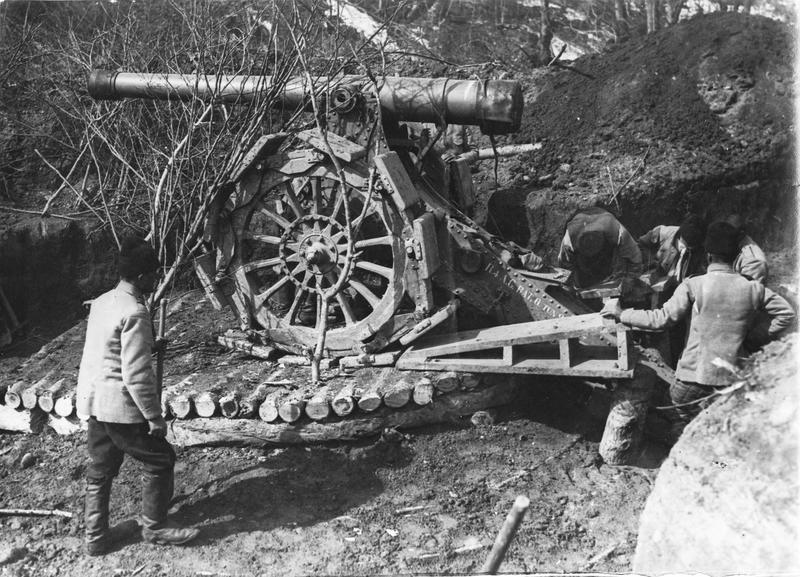
155 mm De Bange gun of the 4th Heavy Artillery Regiment

In 1914, at the start of the First World War, the Romanian Army had the following models and numbers of heavy artillery pieces:

- 150 mm/L12 Schneider Model 1912 quick-fire heavy field howitzer (8 pieces, 330 meters/second muzzle velocity, 7,500 meters range)
- 150 mm Krupp Model 1887 heavy fortress gun (4 pieces)
- 150 mm/L25 Krupp Model 1891 heavy fortress gun (88 pieces, 520 meters/second muzzle velocity, 9,800 meters range)
- 210 mm Krupp Model 1887 heavy fortress gun (6 pieces, 12,000 meters range)
- 210 mm/L12 Krupp Model 1891 heavy fortress gun (36 pieces, 300 meters/second muzzle velocity, 7,269 meters range)
- 210 mm Krupp Model 1885 mortar (4 pieces)
- 152 mm/L32 Armstrong Model 1884 coastal gun (10 pieces, 576 meters/second muzzle velocity, 7,800 meters range)
- 150 mm/L25 Krupp Model 1885 heavy fortress gun (6 pieces; used for stests)
- 155 mm De Bange Model 1877 heavy gun (3 pieces; used for tests)

Other heavy artillery pieces operated during the war included:

- 155 mm Saint Chamond Model 1915 (14 pieces)
- 155 mm Schneider Model 1917 (12 pieces)
- 250 mm Negrei Model 1916 mortar

=== World War II ===
Not counting any World War I-era obsolete heavy gun that may have still been in service, the only piece of heavy artillery operated by the Romanian Army during the Second World War was the 150 mm Skoda K-type gun. Known in the Romanian Army as M34, 180 pieces of this model were acquired between 1936 and 1939.

== Navy ==
The Romanian protected cruiser Elisabeta was originally fitted with four 150 mm Krupp guns. This lasted until 1907, when she was rearmed with four 120 mm Saint Chamond guns.

The two warships of the Vifor-class, acquired by Romania in 1920, were originally armed with three 152 mm Armstrong guns each. This lasted until 1925–1926, when they were rearmed.

== See also ==
- Coastal batteries of Romania
