= Raid on Constanța =

Attack by the Soviet Black Sea Fleet on the Romanian port of Constanța in 1941

- Part of the Black Sea Campaigns of the Eastern Front of World War II
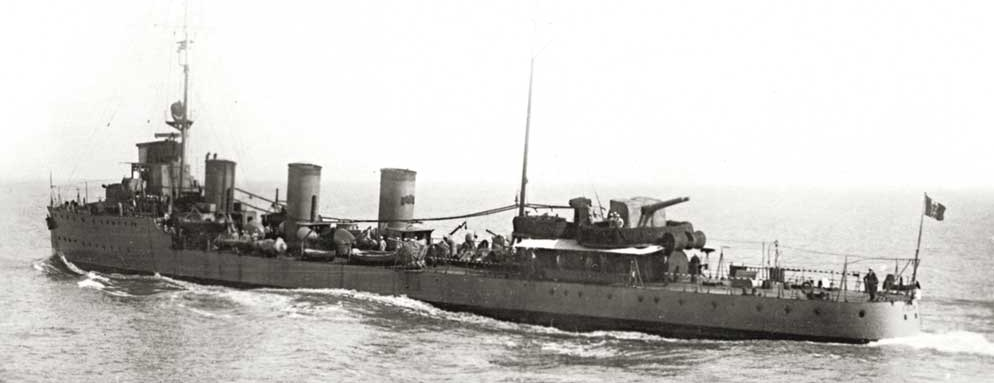
- Romanian destroyer Mărăști
Date	26 June 1941
Location	Constanța, Romania
Result	Axis victory

Belligerents
(Kingdom of Romania) Romania; Germany	Soviet Union

Commanders and leaders
	(Soviet Union) Filipp Oktyabrskiy

Strength
2 destroyers 1 minelayer 1 anti-aircraft battery 2 coastal artillery batteries	1 cruiser 2 destroyer leaders 2 destroyers unknown number of bombers

Casualties and losses
Constanța port facilities damaged	1 cruiser damaged 1 destroyer leader sunk 9 bombers destroyed 268+ killed 69 captured

The Raid on Constanța was an attack by the Soviet Black Sea Fleet on the Romanian port of Constanța on 26 June 1941, shortly after the beginning of Operation Barbarossa, the Axis invasion of the Soviet Union, and resulted in the only encounter between major warships in the Black Sea during World War II. The attack was intended to be a coordinated effort between the fleet's ships and aircraft to split the attention of the defenders, but the bombers did not attack at the designated times.

Two destroyer leaders were ordered to bombard the port in the early morning, covered by a cruiser and a destroyer. They caused some damage, but they were engaged by Axis coastal artillery and several Romanian ships. The two destroyer leaders were slightly damaged and withdrew under fire, steaming into a Romanian minefield; one of the destroyer leaders was sunk and the cruiser was damaged by the mines as they departed the area.

Several groups of bombers later bombed the city that day and the following night, but caused no damage to their targets. Nine bombers were shot down by anti-aircraft fire and Axis fighters. The defeat caused the Soviets to be much more cautious in using their ships within range of Axis defenses.

== Background ==
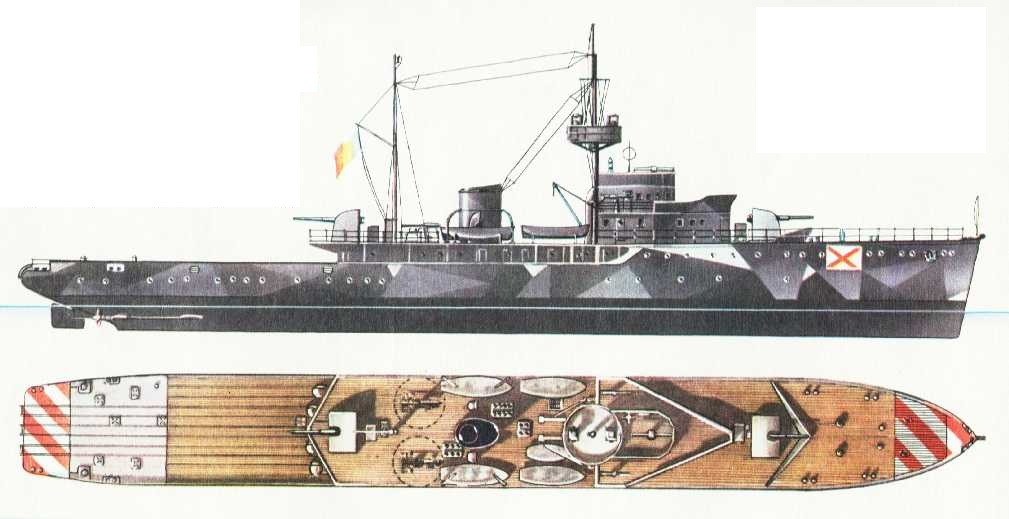
Romanian minelayer Amiral Murgescu

After Romania joined the Tripartite Pact in November 1940, the Germans agreed to construct coastal artillery batteries to bolster obsolete Romanian coastal defences, including the Tirpitz battery south of Constanța, armed with three World War I-era 28 cm (11 in) SK L/45 guns. The battery was operated by 700 Kriegsmarine personnel, although it was nominally under Romanian control like all Axis forces in Romania.

Forewarned by Adolf Hitler about the scheduled date for the German invasion of the Soviet Union, codenamed Operation Barbarossa, on 22 June 1941, the Romanian minelayers Amiral Murgescu, Regele Carol I and Aurora laid 1,000 mines between Cape Midia and Tuzla to protect Constanța between 16 and 19 June.

On 22 June the Royal Romanian Air Force launched attacks against Soviet airfields in Bessarabia, destroying 37 Soviet aircraft on the ground. In retaliation four Tupolev SB light bombers of the Black Sea Fleet's 40th Bomber Aviation Regiment and four Ilyushin DB-3 bombers from the 2nd Mine-Torpedo Aviation Regiment unsuccessfully attacked Constanța during the afternoon. Two SBs failed to return; the Romanian fighter pilot Horia Agarici was credited with shooting down three SB bombers down during the raid and was celebrated as a national hero in a propaganda song. Three other DB-3s later bombed Constanța that night with neither effect nor loss. With the failure of the initial air attacks, Vice Admiral Filipp Oktyabrsky, commander of the Black Sea Fleet, decided to launch a combined aerial and naval attack on Constanța and a seaborne assault on the Danube Delta.

== Bombardment ==
Two Leningrad-class destroyer leaders, Moskva and Kharkov, covered by the cruiser Voroshilov, and the destroyers Soobrazitelny and Smyshleny, were organized into a task force for the attack. The latter destroyer, however, ran aground en route and had to return to port. The Soviets also had the battleship Pariskaya Komuna kept 100 miles (160 km) offshore to exploit any initial success, and Soviet bombers also joined in the attack.

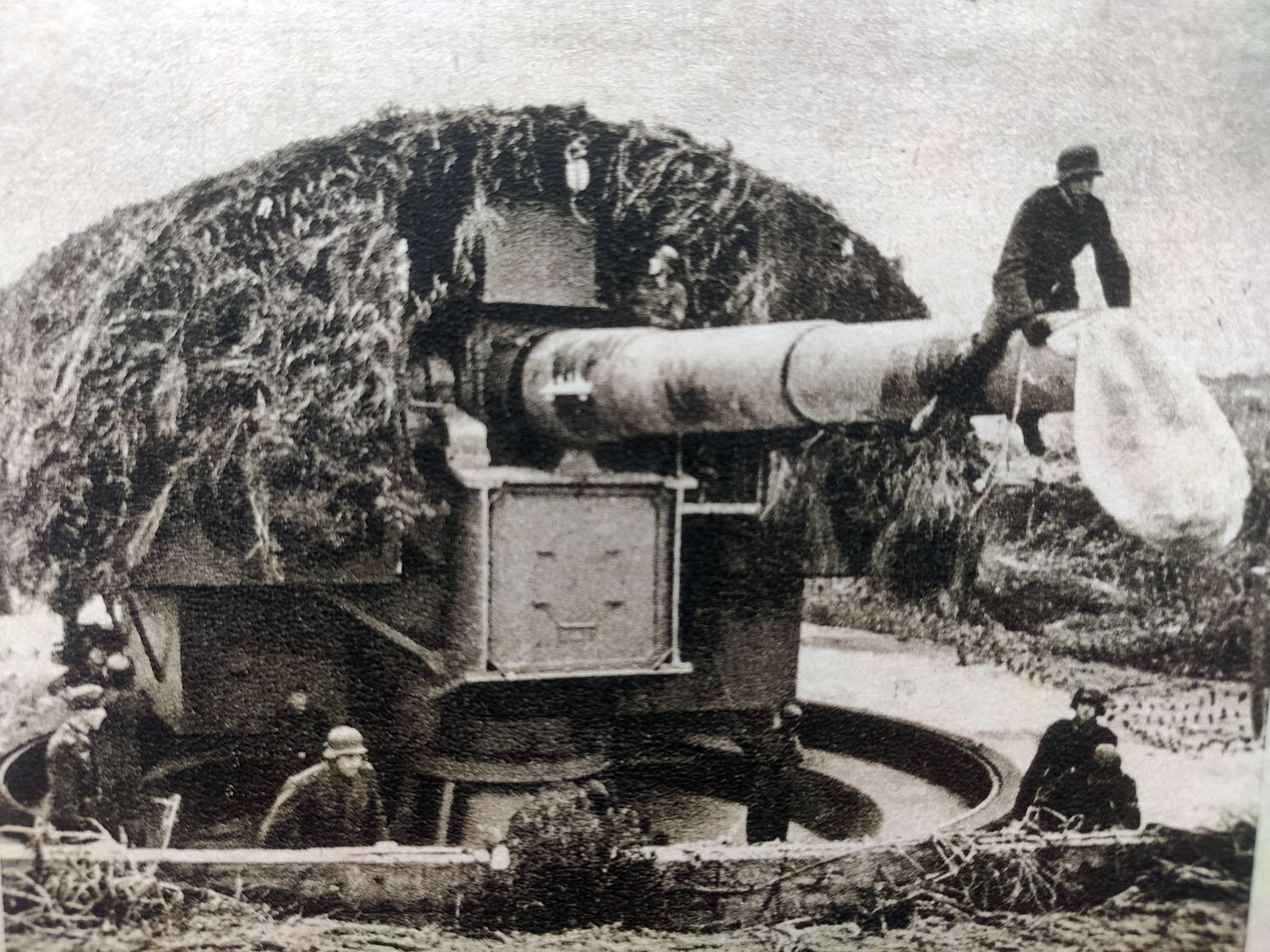
28 cm gun of the Tirpitz battery

The Voroshilov task force approached and shelled Constanța in the early hours of 26 June 1941, setting ablaze some oil tanks and warehouses, and damaging port infrastructure. The Romanians were expecting a Soviet raid and their defences, consisting of the destroyers Regina Maria, Mărăști, the Romanian coastal battery Elisabeta, and the German coastal battery Tirpitz, were prepared to engage the Soviet ships. In ten minutes, starting from 04:02, Moskva and Kharkov fired no less than 350 shells from their 130 mm (5.1 in) guns. At 4:09, aircraft of the Romanian Naval Aviation took off for observation and surveillance. At the same time, the Romanian coastal battery and two warships opened fire with their 120 mm (4.7 in) guns from a distance of 14 miles (23 km). The Tirpitz battery also began to adjust its fire on the Soviet ships. Moskva was damaged by the Romanian warships, her mainmast being brought down by a 120 mm shell while Kharkov was further hit by Tirpitz which caused damage to her steam piping. The Soviets began to withdraw at 4:12 while laying a smoke screen, but sailed into a Romanian minefield. Moskva struck a mine at 4:21 and sank within a few minutes, with 268 sailors killed and 69 survivors captured by the Romanians. According to most sources, she was sunk by Romanian mines, although shells from Regina Maria and the Tirpitz coastal battery or an unintentional friendly fire torpedo attack by Soviet submarine Shch-206 have also been suggested as causes. Voroshilov was also damaged by a mine that exploded when Soobrazitelny's paravanes triggered it.

Long-Range Aviation and the Black Sea Fleet's 63rd Soviet Naval Aviation Brigade coordinated their attacks against targets in Bucharest, Sulina, Constanța and the Danube River on the morning of 26 June. Seventeen DB-3s from the 21st Long-Range Bomber Regiment took off from their airfield in Saky, Crimea. Anti-aircraft fire from the ships in Constanța harbor was heavy and at least one bomber deliberately dropped its bombs into the sea. They were intercepted by Axis fighters after bombing Constanța and one bomber was shot down, although the bomber gunners claimed to have shot down two fighters. The regiment lost seven aircraft that morning to all causes, and an additional pair returned home with one engine knocked out. Afterwards, the Long-Range Aviation commanders decided that their bombers would only fly over Romania at night.

The 63rd Naval Aviation Brigade's operations were more closely integrated into the navy's bombardment with attacks on Constanța in three waves. The first was intended to be before the ships opened fire, the second wave was to be during the bombardment and the last was to distract the Axis forces as the ships withdrew. The pair of Ilyushin Il-4 twin-engined bombers from the 2nd Mine-Torpedo Aviation Regiment that comprised the first wave had to return because of mechanical problems before reaching their target. Of the two SB fast bombers of the second wave, one returned because of a malfunction and the other failed to return. The third wave was intercepted by a squadron (staffel) of Messerschmitt Bf 109 fighters from the 3rd Group of Fighter Wing 52 (Jagdgeschwader 52), well after Moskva had sunk, which claimed to have shot down 11 DB-3s and 7 SBs. (Note: The actual Soviet losses are unknown.) Seven SBs did get through to attack Constanța.

The Romanians claimed to have shot down nine Tupolev SB bombers during the battle, two of them claimed by Amiral Murgescu and one by Mărăşti. The remaining six aircraft were shot down by a Romanian AA battery of 102 mm (4 in) Ansaldo guns. The failure of the raid, together with other losses suffered by the Black Sea Fleet, caused Oktyabrsky to be much more cautious in his use of surface warships.

== Bibliography ==
- Bernád, Dénes; Karlenko, Dmitriy & Roba, Jean-Louis (2007). From Barbarossa to Odessa: The Luftwaffe and Axis Allies Strike South-East, June-October 1941. Hinckley, UK: Midland. ISBN 978-1-85780-273-3.
- Forczyk, Robert (2014). Where the Iron Crosses Grow: The Crimea 1941–44. Oxford, UK: Osprey Publishing. ISBN 978-1-78200-625-1.
- Hervieux, Pierre (2001). "The Romanian Navy at War, 1941–1945". In Preston, Antony (ed.). Warship 2001–2002. London: Conway Maritime Press. pp. 70–88. ISBN 0-85177-901-8.
- Kirchubel, Robert (2003). Operation Barbarossa 1941 (1): Army Group South. Campaign 129. Oxford, UK: Osprey Publishing. ISBN 1-84176-697-6.
- Paterson, Lawrence (2016). Steel and Ice: The U-boat Battle in the Arctic and Black Sea 1941–45. Annapolis, Maryland: Naval Institute Press. ISBN 978-1-59114-258-4.
- Rohwer, Jürgen (2005). Chronology of the War at Sea 1939–1945: The Naval History of World War Two (Third Revised ed.). Annapolis, Maryland: Naval Institute Press. ISBN 1-59114-119-2.
- Stroea, Adrian & Băjenaru, Gheorghe (2010). Artileria Română în date și imagini (in Romanian). București: Editura Centrului Tehnic-Editorial al Armatei [CTEA]. ISBN 978-6-06524-080-3.
- Trigg, Jonathan (2013). Death on the Don: The Destruction of Germany's Allies on the Eastern Front. Stroud, UK: The History Press. ISBN 978-0-7509-5189-0.
- Yakubov, Vladimir & Worth, Richard (2008). "The Soviet Project 7/7U Destroyers". In Jordan, John & Dent, Stephen (eds.). Warship 2008. London: Conway Maritime Press. pp. 99–114. ISBN 978-1-84486-062-3.
- Yakubov, Vladimir & Worth, Richard (2009). "The Soviet Light Cruisers of the Kirov Class". In Jordan, John (ed.). Warship 2009. London: Conway Maritime Press. pp. 82–95. ISBN 978-1-84486-089-0.
