= HMS E23 =

Submarine of the Royal Navy

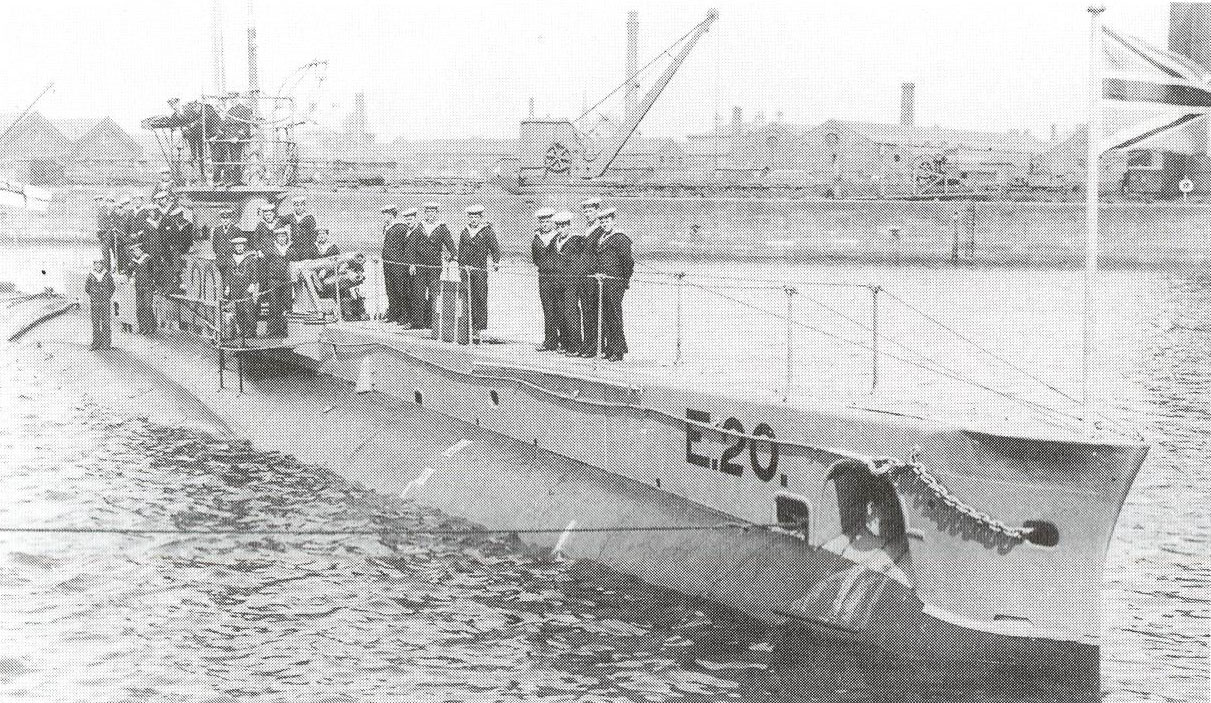
- E-class submarine (HMS E20)

History

United Kingdom
- Name: E23
- Builder: Vickers, Barrow
- Laid down: 28 September 1914
- Launched: 28 September 1915
- Commissioned: 6 December 1915
- Fate: Sold, 6 September 1922

General characteristics
- Class & type: E-class submarine
- Displacement: 662 long tons (673 t) surfaced; 807 long tons (820 t) submerged
- Length: 181 ft (55 m)
- Beam: 15 ft (4.6 m)
- Propulsion: 2 × 800 hp (597 kW) diesel; 2 × 420 hp (313 kW) electric; 2 screws
- Speed: 15 kn (28 km/h; 17 mph) surfaced; 10 kn (19 km/h; 12 mph) submerged
- Range: 3,000 nmi (3,500 mi; 5,600 km) at 10 kn (12 mph; 19 km/h); 65 nmi (75 mi; 120 km) at 5 kn (5.8 mph; 9.3 km/h)
- Complement: 3 officers, 28 ratings
- Crew: 30
- Armament: 5 × 18-inch (450 mm) torpedo tubes (2 bow, 2 beam, 1 stern); 1 × 12-pounder gun

HMS E23 was an E-class submarine built by Vickers, Barrow-in-Furness. She was laid down on 28 September 1914 and was commissioned on 6 December 1915. E23 torpedoed the German dreadnought SMS Westfalen (18,900 tons), holing her off Terschelling on 19 August 1916. E23 was sold on 6 September 1922 in Sunderland.

== Design ==
Like all post-E8 British E-class submarines, E23 had a displacement of 662 long tons (673 t) at the surface and 807 long tons (820 t) while submerged. She had a length of 180 ft (55 m) and a beam of 22 ft 8.5 in (6.922 m). She was powered by two 800 hp (600 kW) Vickers eight-cylinder two-stroke diesel engines and two 420 hp (310 kW) electric motors. The submarine had a maximum surface speed of 16 kn (18 mph; 30 km/h) and a submerged speed of 10 kn (12 mph; 19 km/h). British E-class submarines had a fuel capacity of 50 t (55 short tons) of diesel and ranges of 3,255 nmi (3,746 mi; 6,028 km) when travelling at 10 kn (12 mph; 19 km/h). E23 was capable of operating submerged for five hours when travelling at 5 kn (5.8 mph; 9.3 km/h).

E23 was armed with a 12-pounder 76 mm (3.0 in) QF gun, mounted forward of the conning tower. She had five 18-inch (450 mm) torpedo tubes, two in the bow, one either side amidships and one in the stern with ten torpedoes on board.

E-class submarines had wireless systems with 1 kW (1.3 hp) power ratings; in some submarines, these were later upgraded to 3 kW (4.0 hp) systems by removing a midship torpedo tube. Their maximum design depth was 100 ft (30 m) although in service some reached depths of below 200 ft (61 m). Some submarines contained Fessenden oscillator systems.

== Crew ==
Her complement was three officers and 28 men.
