= 28 cm SK L/45 gun =

28 cm SK L/45
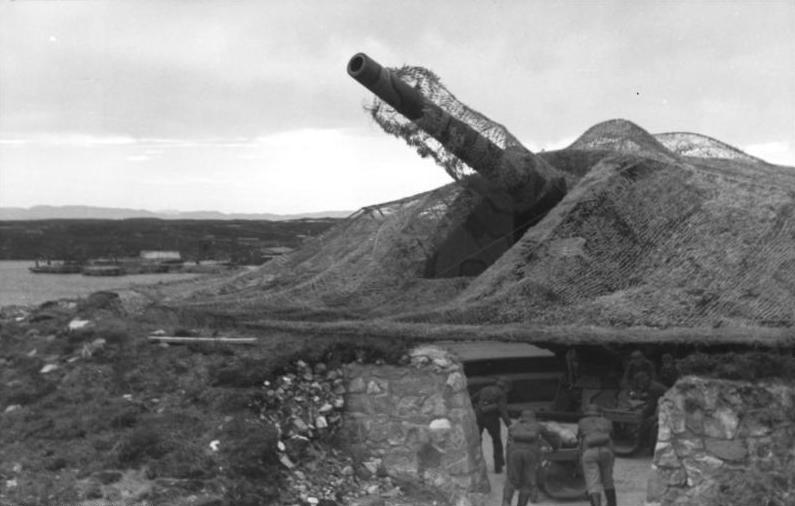
- Coast defense mounting of the SK L/45 gun at MAB 1./507 Husøya in Norway, during World War II
- Type: Naval gun Coast-defence gun
- Place of origin: German Empire

Service history
- In service: 1910—1945
- Used by: German Empire; Nazi Germany; Romania
- Wars: World War I World War II

Production history
- Designer: Krupp
- Designed: 1907—1909
- Manufacturer: Krupp
- Produced: 1909—1913?

Specifications
- Mass: 39.8 t (39 long tons; 44 short tons)
- Length: 12.735 m (41 ft 9 in)
- Barrel length: 12.006 m (39 ft 5 in) (bore length)
- Shell: Separate-loading, cased charge
- Shell weight: 284–302 kg (626–666 lb)
- Caliber: 283 mm (11 in)
- Breech: Horizontal sliding-wedge
- Muzzle velocity: 855 to 875 m/s (2,810 to 2,870 ft/s)

The 28 cm SK L/45 (Note: SK - Schnelladekanone (quick loading cannon); L - Länge in Kaliber (length in caliber)) was a German naval gun that was used in World War I and World War II. Originally a naval gun, it was adapted for land service after World War I.

== Description ==
The 28 cm SK L/45 gun weighed 39.8 metric tons (39.2 long tons; 43.9 short tons), had an overall length of 12.735 meters (41 ft 9.4 in) and its bore length was 12.006 meters (39.39 ft). Although designated as 28 cm (11 in), its actual caliber was 28.3 centimeters (11.1 in). It used the Krupp horizontal sliding-block breech design (or “wedge”, as it is sometimes referred to) rather than the interrupted screw commonly used in heavy guns of other nations. This required that the propellant charge be loaded in a metal, usually brass, case which provides obduration i.e. seals the breech to prevent escape of the expanding propellant gas.

== History ==
=== Naval guns ===
Mounted on Nassau-class battleships and the battlecruiser SMS Von der Tann.

=== Coast defense guns ===
Three guns were mounted at Battery Goeben on Husøya island, near Trondheim, Norway and formed Naval Coast Artillery Battery (Marine Artillerie Batterie) "Goeben", later 1st Battery, Naval Artillery Battalion (1./Marine Artillerie Abteilung) 507 "Husöen".

Another three guns were mounted at Battery Tirpitz on the Romanian coast, south of Constanța, from April 1941 to August 1944, when the battery was destroyed by the retreating Germans. The battery, like all Axis forces in Romania, was nominally under Romanian control, but operated by Kriegsmarine personnel, and contributed to the defence of Constanța in 1941.

== See also ==
- List of naval guns

== Bibliography ==
- Campbell, John (2002). Naval Weapons of World War Two. London: Conway Maritime Press. ISBN 0-87021-459-4.
- Gander, Terry; Chamberlain, Peter (1979). Weapons of the Third Reich: An Encyclopedic Survey of All Small Arms, Artillery and Special Weapons of the German Land Forces 1939–1945. New York: Doubleday. ISBN 0-385-15090-3.
- Hogg, Ian V. (1997). German Artillery of World War Two (2nd corrected ed.). Mechanicsville, PA: Stackpole Books. ISBN 1-85367-480-X.
- Rolf, Rudi (1998). Der Atlantikwall: Bauten der deutschen Küstenbefestigungen 1940-1945. Osnabrück: Biblio. ISBN 3-7648-2469-7.
- Rolf, Rudi (2004). A Dictionary on Modern Fortification: An Illustrated Lexicon on European Fortification in the Period 1800-1945. Middleburg, Netherlands: PRAK.
- Schmalenbach, Paul (1983). "German Navy Large Bore Guns Operational Ashore During World War I". Warship International. XX (2): 123–153. ISSN 0043-0374.
