= The Sailor's Song =

1958 East German black-and-white film

- Film poster
- Directed by: Kurt Maetzig; Günter Reisch
- Written by: Karl-Georg Egel; Paul Wiens
- Produced by: Hans Mahlich
- Starring: Günther Simon
- Cinematography: Joachim Hasler, Otto Merz
- Edited by: Lena Neumann
- Music by: Wilhelm Neef
- Production company: DEFA
- Distributed by: Progress Film
- Release date: 9 November 1958
- Running time: 126 minutes
- Country: East Germany
- Language: German

The Sailor's Song (German: Das Lied der Matrosen) is an East German black-and-white film directed by Kurt Maetzig and Günter Reisch. It was released in 1958.

== Plot ==
As the news of the October Revolution sweep through the world, the German High Seas Fleet's command, wary of a mutiny, decides to send all its ships to a suicide mission in the English Channel. Sailors Albin Köbis and Max Reichpietsch are sentenced to death for political activity. When the socialist sailor Steigert, a member of the firing detail, cannot bring himself to shoot them, he is arrested. On the cruiser Prince Heinrich, Steigert's friends Lenz, Lobke, Kasten and Bartuschek receive Vladimir Lenin's transmit to all of mankind calling for peace. Slowly, the sailors in Kiel — all members of different socialist parties: the Social Democrats, the Independent Socialists and the Spartakists — begin to realize the need for a revolution. The workers and the shipmates rebel against the officers, but the political gaps between them lead the uprising to a failure. In the end, many of the rebel sailors attend the foundation conference of the new Communist Party of Germany.

== Cast ==
- Hilmar Thate as Ludwig Bartuschek
- Raimund Schelcher as August Lenz
- Günther Simon as Erich Steigert
- Ulrich Thein as Henne Lobke
- Horst Kube as Jens Kasten
- Stefan Lisewski as Jupp König
- Jochen Thomas as Sebastian Huber
- Vladimir Gulyaev as Grisha
- Dieter Klamand as Kuddel König
- Elfriede Née as Berta König
- Ekkehard Schall as Schuckert
- Adolf Peter Hoffmann as Gollwitz
- Wolfgang Langhoff as attorney
- Siegfried Weiß as Captain
- Hans-Ulrich Lauffer as machine gunner
- Hans-Hartmut Krüger as officer
- Fred Delmare as sailor
- Rolf Ripperger as sailor
- Sabine Thalbach as lady

== Production ==
The Sailor's Song was conceived in aftermath of the Socialist Unity Party's Conference on Cultural Affairs at October 1957, during which the East German establishment embraced a conservative line and ended the brief period of liberalization that begun after Nikita Khrushchev's Secret Speech. The Sailor's Song was commissioned shortly after, for the celebrations of the fortieth anniversary to the German Revolution.

The script writers Paul Wiens and Karl Georg Egel were instructed to present the 1918 Revolution in accordance with the official Soviet interpretation of history; Walter Ulbricht told that it failed due to the "opportunistic" Social Democrats and to the lack of a Marxist–Leninist party that would have led the workers "in the smashing of the capitalistic economical apparatus." The plot places emphasis on the Spartacus League, and culminates in the founding of the Communist Party of Germany.

Principal photography commenced on June 3, 1958. Directors Kurt Maetzig and Günter Reisch worked separately; the former's crew was responsible for the scenes involving the officers and the admirals, while the latter filmed those with the sailors and the crowds. The Sailor's Song was the greatest project undertaken by DEFA up to that time, and was larger in scale even than Ernst Thälmann. 15,000 workers, soldiers and Volkspolizei members were used as extras during the filming. Since Kiel, the city in which the revolution took place, was located in West Germany, the directors used sets that were constructed in Goerlitz, Warnemünde and Rostock.

== Reception ==
In 1959, Maetzig won East Germany's National Prize, 2nd degree, for his work on the film, as well as a special Peace Prize at the 1st Moscow International Film Festival.

DEFA Studio's director Albert Wilkening wrote that no picture, except Ernst Thälmann, ever touched the people of East Germany as deeply as The Sailor's Song. The SED considered it as one of the country's greatest cinematic achievements, and this view was upheld until the German Reunification. Critics Miera and Antonin Liehm claimed that it was a "made for order" film that was "clumsy and heavy-handed". A West German Film Lexicon cited it as "well designed, but obviously propagandistic."
