= Nazism and the Wehrmacht =

Relationship between the NSDAP and the Wehrmacht

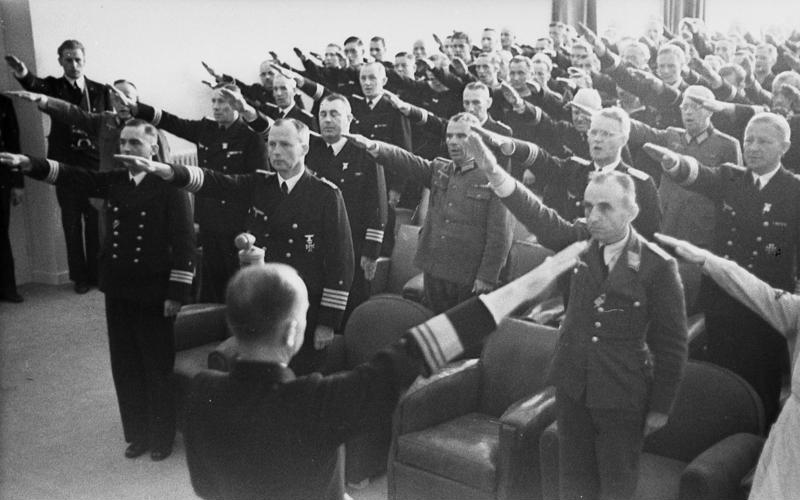
Admiral Karl Dönitz (center, back to camera) returning the Nazi salute of assembled Wehrmacht officers, in France, 1941

The relationship between the Wehrmacht (from 1935 to 1945 the regular combined armed forces of Nazi Germany) and the Nazi Party which ruled Germany has been the subject of an extensive historiographical debate.

After the Nazis came to power, they sought to control all aspects of civil society and the state, including the military. Historically, the German armed forces had operated with a great deal of autonomy, which was steadily eroded until they were under the direct control of the Nazis.

Following the war, many former Nazis denied and downplayed the extensive war crimes committed by the Wehrmacht and its complicity in the Holocaust. This is referred to as the myth of the clean Wehrmacht.

== Politics of the Wehrmacht ==
The German military had traditionally functioned as a "state within a state", with a very large amount of institutional autonomy. Thus Chancellor Otto von Bismarck had been forbidden to attend meetings of the Supreme Council of War because as it was insultingly phrased "Lest this civilian might betray the secrets of the State". In the First World War, the military began to complain more and more that both the Chancellor Theobald von Bethmann Hollweg and the Emperor Wilhelm II were grossly incompetent, and needed to step aside in order to allow the military to win the war.

In March–April 1915, Admiral Alfred von Tirpitz stated that the only thing that was keeping Germany from winning the war was the poor leadership of the Chancellor and the Emperor. His solution was a plan in which Bethmann Hollweg would be sacked and the office of Chancellor abolished; the Kaiser would "temporarily" abdicate; and Field Marshal Hindenburg be given the new office of "Dictator of the Reich", concentrating all political and military power into his hands in order to win the war. Though the Tirpitz plan was not implemented, the very fact it was mooted showed the extent of military dissatisfaction with the existing leadership, and the strength of the "state within the state" in that Tirpitz was not punished despite having essentially called for deposing the Kaiser. In August 1916, Germany became a de facto military dictatorship under the duumvirate of Field Marshal Hindenburg and General Ludendorff, who ruled Germany until 1918. During the rule of the "silent dictatorship" of Hindenburg and Ludendorff, the German government advocated a set of imperialist war aims calling for the annexation of most of Europe and Africa that in many ways were a prototype for the war aims of the Second World War.

=== Aftermath of World War I ===
In October 1918, in order to avoid responsibility for losing the First World War, the military returned power to the civilians and transformed Germany into a democracy, largely because the Allies made it clear that they would never sign an armistice with the Hindenburg-Ludendorff duumvirate. After the November Revolution of 1918, there were demands for the dissolution of the military that had led to such a defeat, but on 23 December 1918, the Provisional government under Friedrich Ebert came under attack from the radical left-wing "People's Marine Division". Ebert called General Wilhelm Gröner for help, and what resulted was the so-called Ebert–Groener pact, where in return for saving the government, the military would be allowed to retain its traditional and informal "state within the state" status. To fulfil his side of the deal, Gröner created a new force of volunteers, the Freikorps to protect the government. In return for crushing the Communist Spartacus League in early January 1919 with its new Freikorps units, the government ended all efforts to democratize the military later that month. Under the laws of the Weimar Republic, no soldier of the Reichswehr was allowed to be a member of a political party or to vote in an election.

=== Weimar Republic ===
In the 1920s, the military did not accept the democratic Weimar Republic as legitimate, and so the Reichswehr under the leadership of Hans von Seeckt became, even more so than under the monarchy, a "state within the state" that operated largely outside the control of politicians. During the Kapp Putsch of March 1920, Seeckt disobeyed orders from the Defence Minister Gustav Noske, the Chancellor Gustav Bauer and the Reich President Friedrich Ebert to suppress the putsch, claiming "There can be no question of sending the Reichswehr to fight these people". Seeckt's actions were entirely illegal as under the Weimar constitution the President was the Supreme Commander-in-Chief, and moreover Seeckt had violated the Reichswehreid, which committed the military to defend the republic. Seeckt ordered the military to disregard Ebert's orders to defend the republic, and instead assumed a stance of apparent neutrality, which in effect meant siding with the Kapp putsch by depriving the government of the means of defending itself. The position of the military as "state within the state" led to only those few officers and soldiers who had attempted to defend the republic being dismissed, and the officers led by Seeckt who had done nothing to defend the republic were allowed to continue with their jobs. The same officers who violated the Reichswehreid during the Kapp putsch by disobeying Ebert's orders to suppress the putsch were later to claim that the Hitler oath made it impossible for them to resist the Nazi regime.

Right from the onset, Seeckt made it clear that he expected to see another world war based on the French political atmosphere concerning German failure to meet the Treaty of Versailles restitution payments. His famous "Memo on the Russian Question" of 11 September 1922, arguing the benefits of an alliance with England or Russia, noted that, "We should be quite clear as to France's attitude. She is following a policy of annihilation pure and simple, which she must follow in pursuance of the unshakable principles of her policy. The hope that economic decisions may divert French policy into another course can be discounted altogether, quite apart from the fact that it is doubtful whether in any case, the economic strengthening of Germany would be in the interests of the ruling industrial circles of France. The contrary appears to be the case, and the French economic interests have the same object as the purely political, that is, the annihilation of Germany. This aim is not affected by the consideration that the debtor, already insolvent, will become even less able to pay up. France no longer expects payment, and in fact, does not want it as it would upset her political plans.... The whole policy of reconciliation and appeasement towards France ... is hopeless in as far as it aims at political success. The question of orientation towards the West, as far as France is concerned, is ruled out. French policy is not quite indifferent as to whether we ally ourselves with Russia or not, for in either case the complete destruction of Germany, not yet fully brought about, remains her objective, and this aim would be more difficult to achieve if Germany were supported by Russia."

Seeckt's memo goes on to cite the unacceptability of the creation of Poland by the Treaty of Versailles as another reason for the coming war: "With Poland [sic] we come now to the core of the Eastern problem. The existence of Poland is intolerable and incompatible with Germany's vital interests. She must disappear and will do so through her own inner weakness and through Russia - with our help. Poland is more intolerable for Russia than for ourselves; Russia can never tolerate Poland. With [sic] Poland collapses one of the strongest pillars of the Peace of Versailles, France's advance post of power. The attainment of this objective must be one of the firmest guiding principles of German policy, as it is capable of achievement – but only through Russia or with her help. Poland can never offer Germany any advantage, either economically, because she is incapable of development, or politically, because she is a vassal state of France. The restoration of the frontier between Russia and Germany is a necessary condition before both sides can become strong. The 1914 frontier between Russia and Germany should be the basis of any understanding between the two countries."

The memo then goes on to cite the necessity of war: "The man who still lives in the days of Versailles, and maintains that Germany has permanently abjured all 'imperialist and military aims', that is, stripped of its demogogic [sic] jargon, all policy of action, is not fit to represent German interests in Russia, nor perhaps anywhere else.... Germany today is certainly not in a position to resist France. Our policy should be to prepare the means of doing so in the future.... The German nation, with its Socialist majority, would be averse from a policy of action, which has to reckon with the possibility of war. It must be admitted that the spirit surrounding the Peace Delegation at Versailles has not yet disappeared, and that the stupid cry of 'No more war! ' is widely echoed. It is echoed by many bourgeois-pacifist elements, but among the workers and also among the members of the official Social Democrat Party there are many who are not prepared to eat out of the hands of France and Poland. It is true that there is a widespread and understandable need for peace among the German people. The clearest heads, when considering the pros and cons of war, will be those of the military, but to pursue a policy means to take the lead. In spite of everything, the German people will follow the leader in the struggle for their existence. Our task is to prepare for this struggle, for we shall not be spared it. If it comes to war – and that seems to be already within measurable distance – it will not be the duty of our leading statesmen to keep Germany out of war – that would be either impossible or suicidal – but to come in on the right side with all possible strength." After meeting Adolf Hitler on 11 March 1923, Seeckt wrote: "We were one in our aim; only our paths were different".

In 1927, the Phoebus film studio went bankrupt. Subsequently, bankruptcy proceedings established that the studio was a front company created by the Reichsmarine to obtain nitrate and that the navy had poured millions of Reichsmark to subsidize the financially struggling studio over the last few years. These disclosures of his knowledge of this matter forced the Defence Minister Otto Gessler to resign in disgrace in January 1928. The military took advantage of the opening created by Gessler's resignation to convince President Paul von Hindenburg to impose General Wilhelm Gröner as the new Defence minister. Gessler was the last civilian Defence minister of the Weimar Republic, and until the abolition of the War ministry by Hitler in 1938, every Defence/War minister was a serving general. The practice of having active duty generals run the Bendlerstrasse (the street in Berlin where the Defence/War ministry was located) in turn further weakened the already weak civilian control of the military, and also led to further politicization of the military since through their representative in the Cabinet the military become involved in issues that had nothing to do with military matters (though that the fact that Cabinet virtually stopped meeting after 1934 did weaken this venue of exercising power).

Reflecting this position as a "state within the state", the Reichswehr created the Ministeramt or Office of the Ministerial Affairs in 1928 under General Kurt von Schleicher to lobby politicians ostensibly for improved military budgets, but in fact the Ministeramt was the vehicle for military interference with politics. German historian Eberhard Kolb wrote that:

"...from the mid-1920s onwards the Army leaders had developed and propagated new social conceptions of a militarist kind, tending towards a fusion of the military and civilian sectors and ultimately a totalitarian military state (Wehrstaat)".

In 1926, Seeckt was ousted by the so-called "modern" faction within the Reichswehr as a group of more technocratic officers were known, which saw Seeckt as too conservative as he was less willing to see the sort of radical reorganization of German society that the "modern" faction wanted. What the German military wanted to see above all was the Wiederwehrhaftmachung of Germany, namely the total militarization of German society in order to fight a total war and thus ensure that Germany did not lose the next war. As such, what both the Nazis and the German Army wanted to see was Germany remade into a totally militarized Volksgemeinschaft that would be ruthlessly purged of those considered to be internal enemies, such as the Jews who were believed to have "stabbed" Germany in "the back" in 1918.

Many officers in the early 1930s started to express admiration for Nazism, which they saw as the best way of creating the much desired Wehrstaat (literally defense state but in actuality a military state akin to that of ancient Sparta). An important sign of the sympathy for Nazism within the military came in September–October 1930, with the trial in Leipzig of three junior officers, Lieutenant Richard Scheringer, Hans Friedrich Wendt and Hans Ludin. The three men were charged with membership in the Nazi Party; at that time membership in political parties was forbidden for members of the Reichswehr. The three officers openly admitted to Nazi Party membership and used it as their defence to claim that the Nazi Party membership should not be forbidden to Reichswehr personnel. When the three officers were caught red-handed distributing Nazi literature at their base, their commanding officer, General Ludwig Beck (of the 5th Artillery Regiment based in Ulm), was furious at their arrest, and argued that since the Nazi Party was a force for good, Reichswehr personnel should be allowed to join the Party. At the Leipzig trial of Ludin and Scheringer, Beck and other officers testified about the good character of the accused, described the Nazi Party as a positive force in German life, and proclaimed his belief that the Reichswehr ban on Nazi Party membership should be rescinded. The trial in Leipzig caused a media sensation and Hitler himself testified at the trial about how much Nazi and Reichswehr values were one and the same. After the trial, many Reichswehr officers started to favour the NSDAP.

By 1931, Germany's reserves of experienced reservists were coming to an end, because Part V of the Treaty of Versailles forbade conscription and existing reservists were ageing. General Kurt von Schleicher worried that unless conscription was restored soon, German military power would be destroyed forever. So, Schleicher and the rest of the Reichswehr leadership were determined that Germany must end Versailles, and in the meantime saw the SA and the other right-wing paramilitary groups as the best substitute for conscription. Schleicher and other Reichswehr generals made secret contacts with the SA leadership starting in 1931. Like the rest of the Reichswehr leadership, Schleicher viewed democracy as a great impediment to military power, and firmly believed that only a dictatorship could make Germany a great military power again. Thus Schleicher worked to replace the democracy with a dictatorship headed by himself. In this way, Schleicher played a key role in the downfall of the Weimar Republic and unintentionally helped to bring about Nazi Germany.

=== Nazis rise to power ===
The military played a major role in January 1933 in persuading President Paul von Hindenburg to dismiss Schleicher and appoint Hitler as Chancellor. The reasons for this was by January 1933 that it was clear that the Schleicher government could only stay in power by proclaiming martial law, and by sending the Reichswehr to crush popular opposition. In doing so, the military would have to kill hundreds, if not thousands of German civilians; any regime established in this way could never expect to build the national consensus necessary to create the Wehrstaat. The military had decided that Hitler alone was capable of peacefully creating the national consensus that would allow the creation of the Wehrstaat, and thus the military successfully brought pressure on Hindenburg to appoint Hitler Chancellor.

Despite their sympathy and approval of the Nazi regime, the military leadership was in the early years of Nazi rule determined to defend their position as a "state within the state" against all rivals. In January 1934, when the Army commander Kurt von Hammerstein resigned, Hitler's choice for Hammerstein's successor General Walter von Reichenau was vetoed by the Army officer corps with the support of President von Hindenburg under the grounds that Reichenau was too much a military radical, and so Werner von Fritsch was chosen as a compromise.

A more serious trial of strength concerned the military and the SA. By 1934, the generals were fearful of Ernst Röhm's desire to have the SA, a force of over 3 million men, absorb the much smaller German Army into its ranks under his leadership. Further, reports of a huge cache of weapons in the hands of SA members gave the army commanders great concern. Matters came to a head in June 1934 when President von Hindenburg, who had the complete loyalty of the Reichswehr, informed Hitler that if he did not move to curb the SA then Hindenburg would dissolve the Government and declare martial law. The Reichswehr leadership also pressured Hitler to act against the SA by threatening to block his plans for merging the offices of the Chancellorship and the Presidency after the soon to be expected death of the gravely ill Hindenburg. The result was the Night of the Long Knives which began on 30 June 1934, and led to the execution of the majority of the SA leadership, much to the barely veiled glee of the military.

British historian A.J. Nicholls wrote that the popular stereotype of the German military in the 1920s–1930s as old-fashioned reactionary Junkers is incorrect, and a disproportionate number of officers had a technocratic bent, and instead of looking back to the German Empire looked with confidence towards a new dynamic, high-tech and revolutionary future dominated by men like themselves. The more technocratic the officer, the more likely he was to be a Nazi. Israeli historian Omer Bartov wrote that most officers were Nazis "because they believed had it not been for [Hitler] they would never have been able to realize their dreams of a highly modern, total war of expansion".

=== Growing alignment with Nazism ===
As part of an effort to preserve the "state within a state", starting in the mid-1930s, the military began to more and more Nazify itself in an effort to persuade Hitler that it was not necessary to end the traditional "state within a state", to prevent Gleichschaltung ("synchronization") being imposed by engaging in what Omer Bartov called a process of "self-Gleichschaltung". As part and parcel of the process of "self-Gleichschaltung", the Defence Minister Werner von Blomberg in February 1934, acting on his own initiative, had all of the Jews serving in the Reichswehr given an automatic and immediate dishonorable discharge. In this way, 74 Jewish soldiers lost their jobs for no other reason than that they were Jewish. Again, on his own initiative Blomberg had the Reichswehr in May 1934 adopt Nazi symbols into their uniforms. In August 1934, again on Blomberg's initiative and that of the Ministeramt chief General Walther von Reichenau, the entire military took an oath of personal loyalty to Hitler, who was most surprised at the offer; the popular view that Hitler imposed the oath on the military is false. The intention of Blomberg and Reichenau in having the military swear an oath to Hitler was to create a personal special bond between Hitler and the military, which was intended to tie Hitler more tightly towards the military and away from the NSDAP. The American historian Gerhard Weinberg wrote about the oath to Hitler:

The assertion that most felt bound by their oath of loyalty to Hitler should be seen in the context of prior oaths and subsequent oaths taken and broken by the same individuals, especially in the highest ranks. They had sworn to uphold the Weimar constitution, and many had sworn to uphold its laws-which included the Versailles Treaty. It was considered desirable, even honourable, to break this oath as often as possible, and anyone who wanted to keep it was despised. After World War II, a substantial number of the military leaders were called on to testify under oath. Anyone who has studied their sworn testimony carefully will have noticed that many took this oath very lightly indeed. If of all the oaths generals and field marshals took, only the one to Hitler is so often cited, that may reveal more about their attitude toward Hitler than towards oaths.

The unintentional effect of these measures to defend the "state within a state" by "self-Gleichschaltung" was to ultimately weaken such a status. At the same time, a new generation of technocratic officers was coming to the fore which was less concerned about maintaining the "state within a state", and more comfortable about being integrated into the Nazi Wehrstaat. Bartov wrote about the new sort of technocratic officers and their views about the Nazi regime:

The combined gratification of personal ambitions, technological obsessions and nationalist aspirations greatly enhanced their identification with Hitler's regime as individuals, professionals, representatives of a caste and leaders of a vast conscript army. Men such as Beck and Guderian, Manstein and Rommel, Doenitz and Kesselring, Milch and Udet cannot be described as mere soldiers strictly devoted to their profession, rearmament and the autonomy of the military establishment while remaining indifferent to and detached from Nazi rule and ideology. The many points of contact between Hitler and his young generals were thus important elements in the integration of the Wehrmacht into the Nazi state, in stark contradiction of its image as a "haven" from Nazism.

Because of these conceptions of Germany being remade into a totalitarian Wehrstaat, the leadership of the military welcomed and embraced the Nazi regime. The German historian Jürgen Förster wrote that it was wrong as many historians have to dismiss the Wehrmacht's self-proclaimed role as one of the "twin pillars" of Nazi Germany (the other pillar being the NSDAP). General Ludwig Beck welcomed the coming of the Nazi regime in 1933, writing "I have wished for years for the political revolution, and now my wishes have come true. It is the first ray of hope since 1918.". (Beck was later executed for opposing Nazism.) In addition, many soldiers had previously been in the Hitler Youth and Reichsarbeitsdienst and had thus been subjected to intensive Nazi indoctrination; as a result, many newly commissioned officers were committed Nazis. In general, the Luftwaffe (air force) was heavily Nazi-influenced, as were the navy and army to a lesser degree, though that was only relative. Caitlin Talmadge explains that Prussian martial tradition gave Hitler an advantage when it came to his officer corps. While most dictatorships had to make a trade-off between competence and loyalty when selecting their officers (due to the risk of facing a coup), Hitler found he had an ample supply of men who possessed both attributes, significantly reducing the coup risk Hitler faced from building an effective army. However, as the successor to a conventionally oriented imperial army of the German Empire, the Wehrmacht tended to fight more effectively than the Waffen-SS, as, within the SS, adherence to Nazism mattered more for advancement. Despite this, Hitler regretted not having purged his officer corps the way Stalin did.

The Blomberg–Fritsch Affair of January–February 1938 that ended with the dismissals of Werner von Fritsch as Army commander and Werner von Blomberg as War Minister was the first Nazi attempt to undermine the position of the military as a "state within the state". At the same time, Hitler abolished the War Ministry and replaced it with the OKW. The Blomberg-Fritsch Affair marked the moment when the leadership of the military began to change from the leaders of a more or less autonomous "state within the state" to that of a merely functional, technocratic elite that existed only to execute the Führer's plans. In one of the last demonstrations of the power of the "state within the state", the Army again vetoed Hitler's plans to appoint Walter von Reichenau as Army commander, and following tense negotiations between Hitler and Gerd von Rundstedt, who was acting as the Army's spokesman in this matter and who wanted Ludwig Beck as Fritsch's successor, agreed to Walter von Brauchitsch as a compromise.

On 8 December 1938, the OKW had instructed all officers in all three services to be thoroughly versed in Nazism and to apply its values in all situations. Starting in February 1939, pamphlets were issued that were made required reading in the military. The content can be gauged by the titles: "Hitler's World Historical Mission", "The Battle for German Living Space", "Hands off Danzig!", and "The Final Solution of the Jewish Question in the Third Reich". The last essay included:

The defensive battle against Jewry will continue, even if the last Jew has left Germany. Two big and important tasks remain: 1) the eradication of all Jewish influence, above all in the economy and in culture; 2) the battle against World Jewry, which tries to incite all people in the world against Germany.

== World War II ==
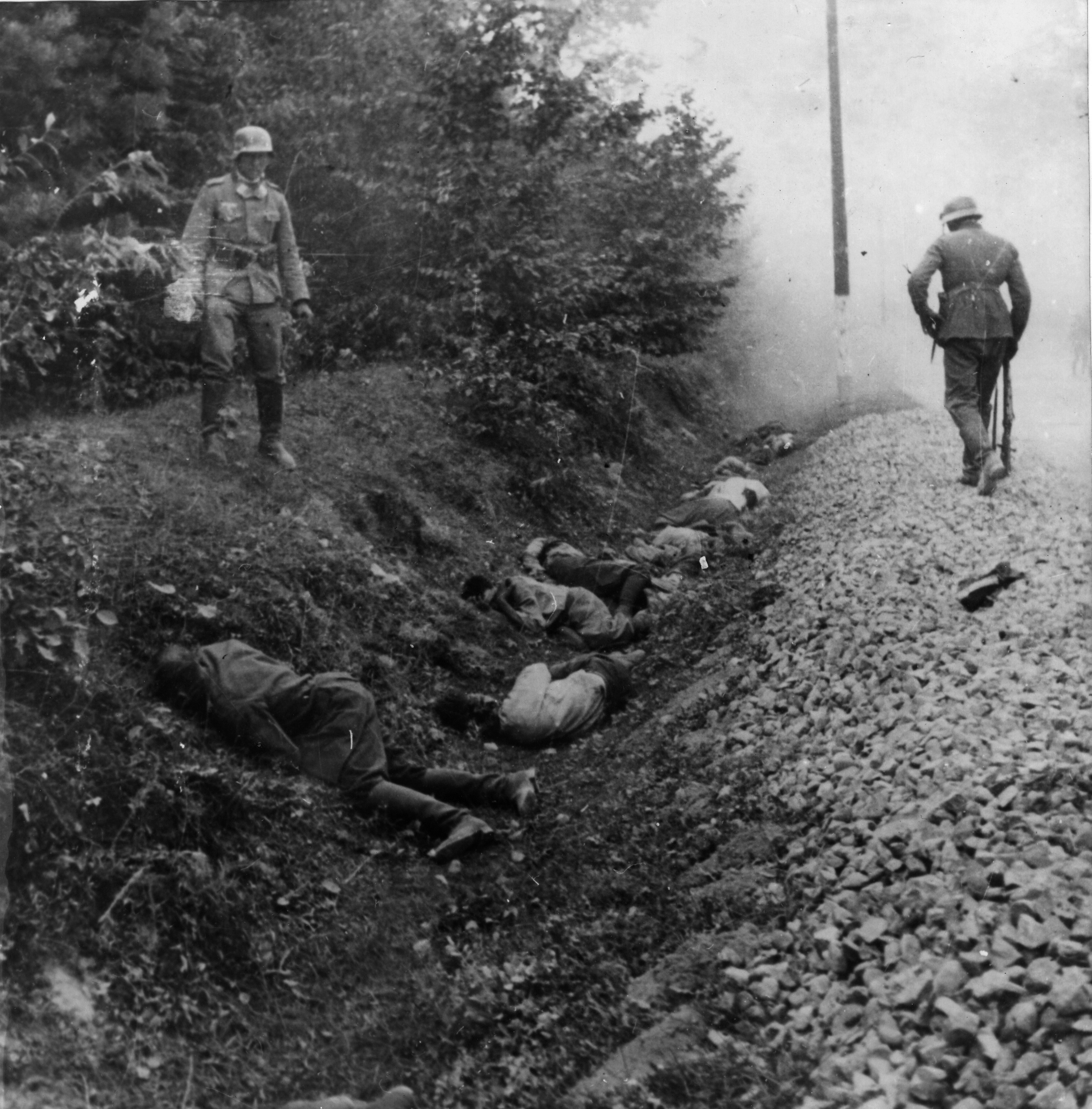
About 300 Polish POWs murdered by the soldiers of the German 15th motorized infantry regiment in the Ciepielów massacre on 9 September 1939.

=== Planning the war of extermination in the East ===
On 22 August 1939, in a conference between Hitler and all of the Reich's senior military leaders, Hitler stated quite explicitly that the coming war against Poland was to be a "war of extermination" in which Hitler expressed his intention to "...to kill without pity or mercy all men, women and children of the Polish race or language". The British historian Sir John Wheeler-Bennett wrote that whatever doubts the Wehrmacht might still have had about the sort of regime that they were about to go to war for and the kind of people that they would be fighting for in this war, should have been clearly dispelled by Hitler's genocidal comments during the conference of 22 August 1939, and that the claims made after the war that the Wehrmacht simply did not understand the nature of the regime that they fought for, are not believable. Anti-Semitic and anti-Polish attitudes like the views expressed above coloured all the instructions that came to Wehrmacht during the summer of 1939 as part of the preparations for the invasion of Poland.

The war against the Soviet Union was presented as a war of extermination right from the start. On 3 March 1941, Hitler summoned the entire military leadership to hear a secret speech about the upcoming Operation Barbarossa in which Hitler stressed that Barbarossa was to be a "war of extermination", that the German military was to disregard all the laws of war, and that he both expected and wanted to see the deaths of millions of people. With the exception of Admiral Wilhelm Canaris, who protested that this was both morally and legally wrong, none of the officers who heard Hitler's speech voiced any objections.

Since some of the officers, such as General Franz Halder, who had previously argued with Hitler about military matters remained silent after hearing this speech, John Wheeler-Bennett presumes that they had no objections to the sort of war that Hitler intended to wage. In 1989, British historian Richard J. Evans wrote that right from the beginning of the war against the Soviet Union on 22 June 1941, the Wehrmacht waged a genocidal war of "extreme brutality and barbarism". Evans wrote that Wehrmacht officers regarded the Russians as "subhuman"; were from the time of the invasion of Poland in 1939 telling their troops the war was caused by "Jewish vermin"; and explained to their troops that war with the Soviet Union was to wipe out the "Jewish Bolshevik subhumans", the "Mongol hordes", the "Asiatic flood" and the "red beast", language clearly intended to produce war crimes by reducing the enemy to something less than human. Such views helped to explain why 3,300,000 of the 5,700,000 Soviet POWs taken by the Germans died in captivity.

=== Criminal orders ===
On 19 May 1941, the OKW issued the "Guidelines for the Conduct of the Troops in Russia", which began by declaring that "Judeo-Bolshevism" to be the most deadly enemy of the German nation and that "It is against this destructive ideology and its adherents that Germany is waging war". The "Guidelines" urged "ruthless and vigorous measures against Bolshevik inciters, guerrillas, saboteurs, Jews and the complete elimination of all active and passive resistance". Reflecting the influence of the guidelines, in a directive sent out to the troops under his command, General Erich Hoepner of the Panzer Group 4 proclaimed:

The war against Russia is an important chapter in the German nation's struggle for existence. It is the old battle of the Germanic against the Slavic people, of the defense of European culture against Muscovite-Asiatic inundation and of the repluse [sic] of Jewish Bolshevism. The objective of this battle must be the demolition of present-day Russia and must, therefore, be conducted with unprecedented severity. Every military action must be guided in planning and execution by an iron resolution to exterminate the enemy remorselessy [sic] and totally. In particular no adherents of the contemporary Russian Bolshevik system are to be spared.

Very typical of the German Army propaganda as part of the preparations for Barbarossa was the following passage from a pamphlet issued in June 1941:

Anyone who has ever looked into the face of a Red commissar knows what the Bolsheviks are. There is no need here for theoretical reflections. It would be an insult to animals if one were to call the features of these, largely Jewish, tormentors of people beasts. They are the embodiment of the infernal, of the personified insane hatred of everything that is noble in humanity. In the shape of these commissars we witness the revolt of the subhuman against noble blood. The masses whom they are driving to their deaths with every means of icy terror and lunatic incitement would have brought about an end of all meaningful life, had the incursion not been prevented at the last moment" [the last statement is a reference to the "preventive war" that Barbarossa was alleged to be].

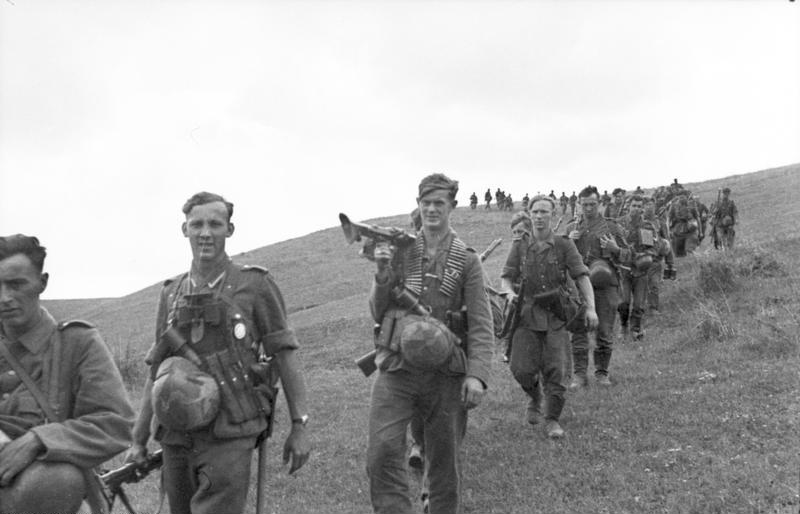
German infantry marching, Soviet Union, June 1943

As a result of the very intense anti-Semitic and anti-Slavic propaganda before and during Barbarossa, most Army officers and soldiers tended to regard the war against the Soviet Union in Nazi terms, seeing their Soviet opponents as so much sub-human trash deserving to be destroyed without mercy. One German soldier wrote home on 4 August 1941, that:

Having encountered these Bolshevik hordes and having seen how they live has made a lasting impression on me. Everyone, even the last doubter knows today, that the battle against these sub-humans, who've been whipped into a frenzy by the Jews, was not only necessary but came in the nick of time. Our Führer has saved Europe from certain chaos.

=== Cooperation with genocidal policies ===
The vast majority of the Wehrmacht officers fully co-operated with the SS in murdering Jews in the Soviet Union. The American historians Williamson Murray and Alan Millet wrote about Wehrmacht-SS relations:

A slogan about partisan war linked the treatment of both Russians and Jews in the great atrocities of 1941: "Where the partisan is, the Jew is, and where the Jew is, is the partisan". Across the breadth of European Russia, the invading Germans took matters into their own hands, as Hitler intended. Einsatzgruppen were responsible for the great bulk of the killing, but they received full cooperation from the Army. At Babi Yar outside of Kiev, SS-Sonderkommando 4a murdered 33,771 Jews and other Soviet citizens in a two-day orgy of violence in revenge for Soviet destruction of Kiev. The local army commander, Major General Kurt Eberhard, cooperated enthusiastically, even providing the SS with an army propaganda company to persuade Kiev's Jews that they were moving for resettlement. On numerous occasions, troop commanders ordered their men to participate in "special actions" against Jews and Communists. The repetitive nature of such orders suggests the level of cooperation between SS and Army that occurred throughout the German advance. Everywhere the Germans advanced, the tide of murder, violence, and destruction followed, on Jews above all, but on the Soviet population in general.

=== Nazis within the armed forces ===
The British historian Richard J. Evans wrote that junior officers in the Army were inclined to be especially zealous Nazis with a third of them having joined the Nazi Party by 1941. Reinforcing the work of the junior leaders were the National Socialist Leadership Guidance Officers, which were created with the purpose of indoctrinating the troops for the "war of extermination" against Soviet Russia. Among higher-ranking officers, 29.2% were NSDAP members by 1941. The Wehrmacht obeyed Hitler's criminal orders for Barbarossa not because of obedience to orders, but because they, like Hitler, believed that the Soviet Union was run by Jews and that Germany must completely destroy "Judeo-Bolshevism". German historian Jürgen Förster wrote that most Wehrmacht officers genuinely believed that most Red Army commissars were Jews who in turn were what kept the Red Army going and that the best way to bring about victory against the Soviet Union was to exterminate the commissars via enforcing the Commissar Order so as to deprive the Russian soldiers of their Jewish leaders.

Sonke Neitzel and Harald Welzer opine that the Wehrmacht "were participants in, if not executioners of, unparalleled mass murder." Using transcriptions of secret records of conversations among POWs, they conclude that most soldiers were not interested in ideology and politics. In reality, being a Nazi, supporting anti-Semitism, and possessing the willingness to kill and commit unnecessary violence usually had nothing to do with each other: many hated the Jews but were shocked at mass extermination by firing squads, while some "anti-Nazis" supported anti-Jewish policies.

From 1943 onwards, the influx of officers and conscripts who had been mainly educated under the Nazis began to further increase the influence of Nazism in the army. Political influence in the military command began to increase later in the war when Hitler's flawed strategic decisions began showing up as serious defeats for the German Army and tensions mounted between the military and the government. When Hitler appointed unqualified personnel such as Hermann Göring to lead his Air Force, failure ensued. A sign of the close ties between Hitler and his armed forces was his choice of the ardent Nazi Grand Admiral Karl Dönitz to be the next Führer, a man whose "...dedication to National Socialist ideas and his close identification with Hitler's strategy in the last stages of the war made him a logical, not surprising, choice by Hitler as his successor".

=== Impact of ideology on war-making ability ===
The Israeli historian Omer Bartov wrote that on the Eastern Front, it was the belief in Nazism that allowed the Wehrmacht to continue to fight, despite enormous losses. Bartov argued that the claim that it was "primary group loyalty", by which men are motivated to fight by loyalty towards their comrades in their unit with little thought to the cause that one is fighting for, cannot possibly have been what motivated the Wehrmacht to fight on the Eastern Front. Bartov wrote that on the Eastern Front, the Wehrmacht was taking such heavy losses that there were no "primary groups" for men to give their loyalty to and that only a belief in Nazism could explain why the Wehrmacht continued to be so aggressive and determined on the offensive, and so dogged and tenacious on the defence, despite often very high numbers of dead and wounded. The Bartov thesis was endorsed by American historians Alan Millet and Williamson Murray, who wrote that, by early 1944, "group cohesion alone" could not explain why the German soldiers carried on fighting:

The explanation seems to be that at every level German officers inculcated their troops with the values and assumptions of Nazi ideology and the mortal menace of the racial-Communist threat. By early 1944, ideological indoctrination was playing a major role in combat preparation on the Eastern and Western fronts. After the war, German generals claimed that neither they nor their troops had taken ideological instruction seriously, but the evidence suggests otherwise. Not only letters and diaries of combat soldiers indicate that ideology was a considerable factor in German combat effectiveness, but unit commanders from the division level on down consistently picked highly decorated combat officers to serve as "leadership" officers in charge of troop indoctrination. Such assignments underline the seriousness with which the army as a whole was taking ideological motivation.

Stephen Fritz argues that the Nazis' vision of the volksgemeinschaft, a classless society which would balance individual achievement with group solidarity, cooperation with competition, as the individual fulfilled their potential within the framework of the broader community, was an immensely powerful vision to many German soldiers, to the extent they were willing to overlook its racist and anti-Semitic essence. This vision allowed Hitler to maintain popular support amongst German soldiers right up until the end of the war and inspired fierce devotion and loyalty. Fritz argues that the concept was appealing to the German military even before Hitler assumed power, as they saw it as a way to create a more cohesive and effective combat force. Since the military envisioned any future war as a total one that would require the complete mobilisation of German society, military leaders pursued the volksgemeinschaft as a means of realising national unity. According to Fritz, it was not simply rhetoric – the officer corp began to become the least snobbish in German history, opening up positions based on talent and had a general sympathy to the volksgemeinschaft; Hitler spoke proudly of this process. Hitler and his generals shared a vision in which the spirit of the Frontgemeinschaft of the First World War would become a permanent state of affairs.

MacGregor Knox explains that traditionally, the German officer corp had been dominated by the German nobility and upper-classes. During his rule, Hitler broke down this institutional preference and created a "people's officer corps" – Knox observes that in 1937, 14% of lieutenants had been noble, yet this fell to 4% by 1943. While in 1941 90% of officer candidates possessed the Abitur, an elite secondary-school leaving certificate, by the second half of the war this fell to 44% and 12% of officers had only primary education, while candidates from lower-class backgrounds had risen from 5% in 1937 to 20% in 1942. By removing the institutional social restrictions on who could become an officer, Hitler instead made rank dependent upon combat ability and élan, thus encouraging soldiers to fight even harder to earn the prospect of a swift rise through the ranks. The Wehrmacht thus became a "soldier's community" fused by shared ambition, fanaticism, and crime. The Nazi "pursuit of happiness" thus immunised both the military and German society at large from a repeat of 1918 and while incapable of delaying the defeat of the regime, ensured many soldiers held out far longer than they may otherwise have.

In 1944, the 20 July plot involving a minority of officers received overwhelming disapproval from the Wehrmacht, who rallied for the Nazi regime. The American historian Gerhard Weinberg wrote about the 20 July putsch and the military: "As both sides sent their orders over the teleprinters in Germany's last 'election' as a united country until 1990, most generals chose to support the Hitler regime and to reinforce rather than arrest the police." The 20 July putsch attempt was crushed by Army troops commanded by Major Otto Ernst Remer with no involvement from the SS. Stephen Fritz explains that the putsch was seen by soldiers at the front as the treacherous actions of an unrepresentative aristocratic clique and that by that point in the war, the Wehrmacht had become essentially "Nazified."

== Mechanisms of control ==
=== Terror ===
Because the military believed that Germany had not been defeated in World War I, the lesson that the Wehrmacht took from this was for the need for a draconian military justice system that would ruthlessly stamp out anything that might lead to any new "stab in the back". It had been neither forgotten nor forgiven by the military that the November Revolution had started with the High Seas mutiny. In August 1917, there had been a mutiny in the High Seas Fleet, which after it was crushed, saw the execution of its leaders' Max Reichpietsch and Albin Köbis with the rest of the mutineers given long prison sentences. The "lesson" drawn by the Navy and the rest of the Wehrmacht had been that if only the High Seas Fleet mutiny of 1917 been followed up with more executions instead of just Reichpietsch and Köbis, then the much more serious mutiny of November 1918 would have been avoided. For this reason, all violations of the military code that hindered the war effort were treated by military courts as equivalent to high treason, though in the vast majority of the cases, politics were not a factor.

During World War II, the German military had thousands of its members executed, often for the most trivial violations of discipline. In World War I, the German Army had executed only 48 of its soldiers; in World War II between 13,000 and 15,000 German soldiers were executed for violations of military code. The German historians' Manfred Messerschmidt and Fritz Wüllner in a 1987 study of Wehrmacht justice have argued that the figure of 15,000 executed is too low, as it only records verdicts handed down by military courts and that in the last months of the war, the Wehrmacht abandoned even the pretence of holding trials, and simply executed extrajudicially so-called "defeatists". Messerschmidt and Wüllner contended that, if one takes into account extrajudicial executions, the real figure is about 30,000 executions of Wehrmacht personnel between 1939 and 1945. The only country that executed more of its own servicemen than Germany in World War II was the Soviet Union. By way of contrast, during all of World War II, Britain executed 40 of its servicemen, France executed 102 and the United States executed 146 while the Wehrmacht executed 519 of its personnel during the first 13 months of the war alone. In addition, German courts-martial sentenced ten of thousands of German soldiers to service in Strafbattalion (penal battalions). Their conditions were so brutal that service in a Wehrmacht penal battalion was equivalent to a death sentence. Those sentenced to serve in the penal battalions called them "death battalions" given the fact that the chances for survival were almost nil.

The exception towards the otherwise ferocious application of military justice was the widespread tolerance of war crimes against civilians and POWs, especially in Eastern Europe, provided that such actions took place in a "disciplined" and "orderly" way. So-called "wild shootings" and "wild requisitions" against civilians were always disapproved of, whereas massive violence against civilians provided that it took place in a context that was "disciplined" and pseudo-legal were considered to be acceptable. This was especially the case with Jews in the occupied areas of the Soviet Union, where it was official policy to generally not prosecute those soldiers who murdered Soviet Jews, and even in those cases, where prosecutions did occur, claiming that one hated Jews and killed out of a desire for "revenge" for the November Revolution of 1918 was allowed as a defence (though in fact, the Soviet Jewish population had nothing to do with the November Revolution). German military courts always gave very light sentences to those soldiers who murdered Soviet Jews, even in an "undisciplined" way, and even then, Hitler usually intervened to pardon the accused.

On 17 August 1938 the German military code was re-written to make desertion equivalent to high treason, and created a new crime of Wehrkraftzersetzung (literally: "subversion of the war effort"), a vaguely defined crime that carried the death penalty for anyone serving in the Wehrmacht who either attempted to influence others to not carry out orders fully and unconditionally and/or weakened the resolve of the German nation to continue the fight until total victory. About 20% of the death sentences imposed by Wehrmacht courts were for Wehrkraftzersetzung. Wehrkraftzersetzung was so vaguely defined as to constitute anything from grumbling about the quality of food to making unflattering remarks about an officer. German military courts-martial consisted of three judges, one lawyer serving as a prosecutor, and two Wehrmacht men, usually a staff officer and another man, who was expected to be of the same rank as the defendant. In theory, the defendant had the automatic right to a defence lawyer for all charges that involved the death penalty and could be granted defence counsel in a non-capital case only if the court decided to permit that privilege, but in practice, the right to defence counsel was rarely granted, even in cases that carried capital punishment where the law required it.

The abrogation of the rights of the accused was part of the "simplified operating procedure", which as its name implied stripped away rights from the defendant, and turned the courts-martial into a drumhead tribunal that was not concerned with questions of innocence and guilt, but rather how harsh the punishment would be. After the sentence was passed, there was no right of judicial appeal, and the case went up to the commander of the fleet, army or air fleet that the defendant was serving in, who could either confirm the sentence or order a new trial if he believed the sentence to be either too harsh or too lenient. All commanders received advice from a panel of judges which was not binding, but usually acted upon. The system served to deflect responsibility; commanders who upheld death sentences claimed that they were only following the advice of the judges while the judges claimed that their opinions were purely advisory, and the actual responsibility to uphold the death sentences rested with the commander.

A major latter-day debate about German military justice has been the demand by families of Wehrmacht men executed for desertion that they should be recognized as part of the resistance to Hitler under the grounds that by refusing to fight for the Nazi regime, they were also opposing it. Messerschmidt and Wüllner wrote that many of Wehrmacht desertions were politically motivated out of disgust with the genocidal politics of the Nazi regime, and that "Whom were these military judges serving who sent soldiers to their deaths? In numerous judgments, this question is clearly answered: they were serving the Führer, final victory, Nazi Germany". German veterans have for the most part been opposed to this. Only in September 2009 did Germany pardon the men convicted of desertion under the grounds that to desert from a criminal war was not a crime. At the time, there were three Wehrmacht deserters still alive, the vast majority having been either executed or killed in penal battalions during the war, and the few who survived the war were shunned as traitors and cowards by the German public after the war. One of the surviving deserters, a sailor who attempted to desert in 1942 named Ludwig Baumann, summarized the arguments against people such as himself as:

"It went like this: an act of treason might have endangered the lives of other German soldiers, therefore we can't absolve you. But what I say is, if only more soldiers had committed treason so many millions of lives could have been saved, in the concentration camps and so on. You can't place the lives of some soldiers above all those millions who died. And until Germany recognizes this, it will not have broken with its Nazi past."

=== Corruption ===
In order to ensure the absolute loyalty of the Wehrmacht officers, Hitler had created what the American historian Gerhard Weinberg called a "...a vast secret program of bribery involving practically all at the highest levels of command". Hitler routinely presented his leading commanders with "gifts" of free estates, cars, cheques made out for large sums of cash and lifetime exemptions from paying taxes.

Typical of the Führer's "gifts" was the cheque made out for a half-million Reichsmark presented to Field-Marshal Günther von Kluge in October 1942 together with the promise that Kluge could bill the German treasury for improvements to his estate. Such was the success of Hitler's bribery system that by 1942 many officers had come to expect "gifts" from Hitler and generally lost their willingness to disobey or sleight him. When Hitler sacked Field Marshal Fedor von Bock in December 1941, Bock's first reaction was to contact Hitler's aide Rudolf Schmundt to ask him if his sacking meant that he was no longer to receive the money.

The first officer to be bribed into loyalty was the old World War I hero Field Marshal August von Mackensen, who criticized the Nazi regime for the murder of General Kurt von Schleicher in a speech before General Staff Association in February 1935. To silence him, Hitler gave Mackensen a free estate of 1,250 hectares later that same year in exchange for a promise never to criticize the Nazi regime again in either public or private. The agreement mostly worked; Mackensen never criticized the Nazi regime in public again, through Hitler was offended in February 1940 when Mackensen mentioned to Walter von Brauchitsch that the army had disgraced itself by committing massacres during the recent campaign in Poland. Hitler felt that to be a violation of their agreement of 1935, though Mackensen kept his estate.

==== Konto 5 fund ====
The basis of the corruption system were regular monthly tax-free payments of 4,000 Reichsmark for field marshals and grand admirals and 2,000 RM for all other senior officers, which came from a special fund called Konto 5 run by the chief of the Reich Chancellery Hans Lammers. In addition, officers received as birthday presents cheques usually made out for the sum of 250,000 RM, which were exempt from income taxes. This money was on top of the official salary of 26,000 RM a year for field marshals and grand admirals and 24,000 RM a year for colonel generals and general admirals. Senior officers were given a life-time exemption from paying income tax (up to 65 per cent by 1939); they also received spending allowances for food, medical care, clothing, and housing. By way of contrast, infantrymen who were given the task of clearing landmines were given a one-RM a day danger pay supplement. The money from Konto 5 was deposited for the officer's life-time, and did not stop if the officer retired.

The Konto 5 slush fund started with a budget of about 150,000 RM in 1933 and by 1945 had grown to about 40 million RM Payments from Konto 5, known officially as Aufwandsentschädigungen (compensation for expenses) were made to Cabinet ministers and senior civil servants from April 1936 onwards. As part of the reorganization of the military command structure following the Blomberg–Fritsch Affair in early 1938, it was declared that the service chiefs, namely OKW chief Wilhelm Keitel, Army commander Walter von Brauchitsch, Luftwaffe commander Hermann Göring and Kriegsmarine commander Erich Raeder were to have the same status as Cabinet ministers and as such, they all started to receive publicly the same pay as a Cabinet member and privately payments from Konto 5.

==== Nature of payments ====
Every officer who started to receive the money always had a meeting first with Lammers, who informed them that the future payments would depend on how much loyalty they were willing to show Hitler, and what the Führer gave with one hand, could just as easily be taken away with the other. Payments from Konto 5 to the bank account of General Friedrich Paulus stopped in August 1943 not because Paulus had lost the Battle of Stalingrad, but because Paulus had gone on Soviet radio to blame Hitler for the defeat.

In the same way, after the failure of the July 20 putsch of 1944, the families of Erwin Rommel, Franz Halder, Friedrich Fromm and Günther von Kluge were punished by being cut off from the monthly payments from Konto 5. In the case of Field Marshal Erwin von Witzleben, it was demanded that his family pay back all of the bribe money he had taken from Konto 5 since the money was given as a reward for loyalty to the Führer, which Witzleben was evidently not. The illicit nature of these payments was underlined by Lammers who would warn an officer that was to receive money from Konto 5 not to speak about these payments to anyone and to keep as few written records as possible.

==== Consequences ====
The American historian Norman Goda wrote that after General Heinz Guderian received a free estate of 937 hectares in Poland in the spring of 1943, that the doubts that he had been expressing since late 1941 about the Hitler's military leadership suddenly ceased, and he became one of Hitler's most ardent military supporters, or as Joseph Goebbels described him in his diary, "a glowing and unqualified follower of the Führer". Before receiving the estate, Guderian as Inspector General for the Panzers had been opposed to the plans for Operation Zitadelle, which subsequently led to Wehrmacht's failure in the Battle of Kursk; after receiving the estate, he apparently changed his mind. Instead of criticizing Zitadelle openly, Guderian approached Goebbels to ask him if he could somehow talk Hitler out of Zitadelle, behaviour that Goda described as very atypical for Guderian. During 20 July putsch of 1944, Guderian ordered Panzer units to Berlin to crush it, and then sat on the Court of Honor that had the responsibility of expelling officers involved so that they could be tried before the People's Court, a duty that Guderian performed with considerable zeal. It was only after January 1945, when Guderian's estate fell behind Soviet lines that Guderian began to once more to disagree with Hitler, leading to Guderian being fired as Chief of the General Staff in March 1945.

Goda used Field Marshal Wilhelm Ritter von Leeb as an all-too-typical example of a Wehrmacht officer whose greed overwhelmed any moral revulsion that they might have felt about the "Final Solution". In late June-early July 1941, Leeb, as the commander of Army Group North, had witnessed the massacres of Jews by the Einsatzgruppen, Lithuanian auxiliaries and the men of the 16th Army outside of Kaunas. Leeb was described as being "moderately disturbed", and sent in mildly critical reports about the massacres. Leeb approved of the killing of Jewish men, claiming that this was justified by their supposed crimes during the Soviet occupation of Lithuania, but that the killing of women and children might have been taking things too far. In response, Hitler's aide General Rudolf Schmundt told Leeb that he was out of line and should in the future co-operate fully with the SS in "special tasks". Schmundt asked if Leeb appreciated his monthly payments from Konto 5, and reminded him that his birthday was coming up, for which the Führer was planning to give him a 250,000 R.M cheque for his loyalty. Leeb never again protested about the massacres, and duly received 250,000 R.M in September 1941. In the same month, Franz Walter Stahlecker, the commander of Einsatzgruppe A, in a report to Berlin praised Leeb's Army Group for its exemplary co-operation.

The subject of corruption proved to be embarrassing for its recipients. Under oath at Nuremberg, Walther von Brauchitsch committed perjury when he denied taking any bribes. Brauchitsch's bank records showed that he had been receiving 4,000 R.M/month payments from Konto 5 from 1938 until the end of the war. At his trial in 1948, General Franz Halder perjured himself when he denied that he had taken bribes, and then had to maintain a stern silence when the American prosecutor James M. McHaney produced bank records showing otherwise. Weinberg commented that "the bribery system understandably does not figure prominently in the endless memoir literature of the recipients and has attracted little scholarly attention".

=== Chaplaincy ===
In the Wehrmacht, chaplains were required to serve at the front under fire. This regulation was introduced by the Nazi regime, which expressed strong and barely veiled anti-Christian tendencies out of the hope that it would lead to most of the chaplaincy getting killed in battle. Protestant chaplains carried firearms, were required to undergo military training, were expected to fight if necessary and those Protestant clergymen who were World War I veterans were given preference in recruiting chaplains. Catholic chaplains, by contrast, were unarmed, did not receive military training and were not expected to fight. All chaplains, Catholic and Protestant had to know first-aid because of their role in ministering at the front.

A great many of the Protestant chaplains in the Wehrmacht were members of the "German Christian" movement that sought to "de-Judize" Christianity, and even those chaplains who were not members of the "German Christian" movement were influenced by it in various ways. Because of their emphasis upon an aggressively "manly", militaristic and ultra-nationalistic interpretation of Christianity, a disproportionate number of German Christian pastors joined the Wehrmacht to serve as chaplains. The requirement that Lutheran chaplains serve at the front with firearms served to attract German Christian pastors, most of whom were World War I veterans who saw a chance to practice what they preached by becoming figuratively "combat priests". Likewise, the Wehrmacht favoured the recruitment of German Christian pastors, and banned those pastors belonging to the Confessing Church from becoming chaplains. Both Heinrich Lonicier, the Lutheran bishop of Breslau (modern Wrocław, Poland) who was also a senior Army chaplain, a leading German Christian and NSDAP member and the equally ardent German Christian and NSDAP member Friedrich Ronneberger, the Navy's chief Protestant chaplain had ambitions to become the Reich bishop of the Lutheran church, and saw the military as a basis for achieving their ambitions. Lonicier, in particular, enjoyed the open backing of his close friends Joseph Goebbels and Walter von Brauchitsch in his attempts to depose the Lutheran Reich bishop Ludwig Müller. However, Bishop Lonicier's efforts created powerful opposition from the SS and other NSDAP elements who argued that the incompetent Müller made for a far more pliable Reich bishop than what the able and vigorous Lonicier would ever be, and that anyhow Lonicier's plans for a military-backed Nazified Lutheran church under his leadership playing a major role in German public life conflicted directly with their plans to ultimately do away with Christianity altogether in favour of a revived paganism.

As part of their efforts to promote "Aryan Christianity" in the Wehrmacht, the Old Testament was in effect banned, and only the New Testament was available to Wehrmacht members. In the same way, German Christian chaplains preached a "manly Christianity" to Wehrmacht members that unabashedly glorified war as the only fit and proper activity for "real men". Besides for being outspoken supporters of the war, German Christian Wehrmacht chaplains preached in their sermons support for the Nazi regime, antisemitism, and the superiority of the "Aryan race" over all others. Owing to the fear of death and disfigurement faced by men in the chaos of battlefields everywhere together with the loss of friends and comrades, many Wehrmacht men sought solace in religion, and so the chaplains had considerable spiritual influence with the Wehrmacht rank and file. Moreover, the vast majority of Germans of that generation regularly attended church, and so the chaplains had a greater role in the social life of the Wehrmacht than what chaplains do today in a more secular age. Despite their support for the Nazi regime, the anti-Christian tendencies of the regime meant that it did its utmost to restrict both the numbers and powers of chaplains including the German Christians throughout the war.

There was no equivalent to the German Christian Movement in the Catholic Church, though Franz-Justus Rarkowski, the Catholic bishop who was the chief Catholic chaplain of the Wehrmacht was a strong supporter of the regime. In his Christmas message in 1940 for Catholics serving in the Wehrmacht, Bishop Rarkowski used the occasion to blame the Jews not only for the war but for every problem in German history. Perhaps more typical was the case of a Catholic chaplain named Ernst Tewes serving on the Eastern Front, known not to be a supporter of the regime, who had led the protests against the massacre at Belaya Tserkov in August 1941, who in 1967-68 gave evidence against eleven members of Sonderkommando 4a for the massacre of thousands of Jews in the southern USSR., and yet in 1942 wrote in his diary concerning the "anti-partisan" massacres of 1942 that "the furies of war had been unleashed". Another Catholic chaplain serving on the Eastern Front was deeply shocked when another Catholic chaplain told him "There is a curse upon this people [Jews] ever since the crucifixion of Jesus when they cried: 'Let his blood be on our heads and the heads of our children', and as such, the Jews were only getting what they deserved."

A large part of the reason why most chaplains, both Protestant and Catholic supported the regime was due to the intense background checks performed on any priest who wanted to join the Wehrmacht as a chaplain by their own churches (who did not want any "trouble-makers" becoming chaplains lest they strain an already fraught relationship with the regime), the Gestapo and the Wehrmacht. Mindful of the important role chaplains played in the social life of the Wehrmacht, any priest who had done or said anything "pro-Jewish" in the past was instantly disqualified from becoming a chaplain. The American historian Doris Bergen wrote that a great number of Lutheran and Catholic priests must have been either anti-Semitics or at least not done anything "pro-Jewish" as the Wehrmacht never suffered from a shortage of chaplains despite the "high" standards they had imposed in 1935 for the new expanded Wehrmacht created by the return of conscription, which was maintained right to the end of 1945. Only a "handful" of potential chaplains were excluded by the Gestapo for "pro-Jewish" actions in the past. Moreover, the energetic activities of the German Christian pastors together with the general anti-Christian tone of the regime led to those chaplains who were not German Christians to incorporate aspects of their theology as a way of counteracting their influence.

Despite the screening process, there were occasions when chaplains did protest. In August 1941, when the commander of the 6th Army, General Walter von Reichenau ordered his men to assist the Einsatzgruppen and its Ukrainian auxiliaries with shooting the Jewish children at an orphanage in Belaya Tserkov who had been rendered orphans after their parents had been shot in the preceding days, the Protestant and Catholic chaplains, namely Pastor Wilczek and Father Ernst Tewes attached to 295th Infantry Division made strenuous efforts first to save the children, and when that failed, to protest the massacre. In 1968 Father Tewes was a leading witness for the prosecution at the trial of the SS leaders who had ordered the massacre at Belaya Tserkov, where he noted that "All those we wanted to save, were shot. Because of our initiative it just happened a few days later than planned". Even more dramatic was the case at a military base outside of Stettin (modern Szczecin, Poland), where two local Catholic chaplains, disgusted by atrocities that one had seen while serving in Poland in 1939, formed an oppositional group, the "Wednesday Circle" for Catholic soldiers, where they provided detailed information about the "Final Solution" and predicted God would punish Germany with the most terrible defeat for the Holocaust. Betrayed when one of the soldiers they had recruited to the "Wednesday Circle" denounced them, Fathers Herbert Simoleit and Friedrich Lorenz were convicted by a court-martial for high treason and executed in November 1944.

Bergen wrote that such case was the exception, not the rule, and most chaplains loyally supported the regime. Only ten out of a thousand chaplains were known to protest genocide. Bergen wrote that by rationalizing the Shoah as something the Jews had brought down on themselves, and by doing their utmost to maintain morale, the majority of military chaplains played an important role in maintaining the fighting spirit of the Wehrmacht, and thereby in their own way helped to prolong the war, and with it the "Final Solution".

== See also ==
Overviews

- History of Germany
- Military history of Germany
- German Army (1935–1945)

Specific issues

- German war crimes
- War crimes in occupied Poland during World War II
- Nazi crimes against the Polish nation
- Consequences of Nazism
- Guidelines for the Conduct of the Troops in Russia

General reference entries

- Glossary of Nazi Germany
