= High Seas Fleet =

Imperial German Navy fleet

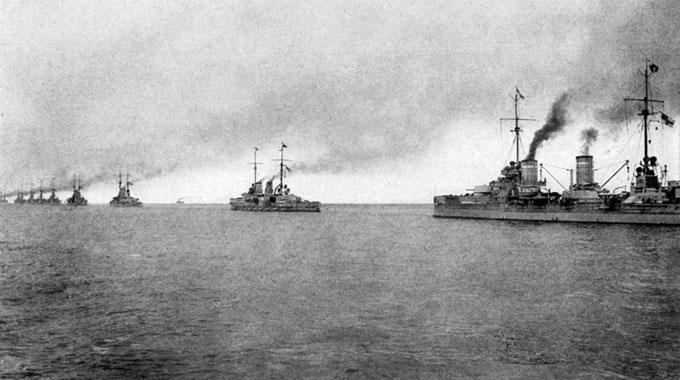
- Dreadnoughts of the High Seas Fleet
- Active: 16 February 1907 – 10 January 1919
- Country: German Empire
- Branch: Imperial German Navy
- Type: Fleet
- Size: ~100 ships
- Engagements: Battle of Jutland

Commanders
- Notable commanders: Prince Heinrich; Henning von Holtzendorff; Friedrich von Ingenohl; Hugo von Pohl; Reinhard Scheer; Franz von Hipper; Ludwig von Reuter

The High Seas Fleet (German: Hochseeflotte) was the battle fleet of the Imperial German Navy and saw action during the First World War. In February 1907, the Home Fleet (Heimatflotte) was renamed the High Seas Fleet. Admiral Alfred von Tirpitz was the architect of the fleet; he envisioned a force powerful enough to challenge the Royal Navy. Kaiser Wilhelm II, the German Emperor, championed the fleet as the instrument by which he would seize overseas possessions and make Germany a global power. By concentrating a powerful battle fleet in the North Sea while the Royal Navy was required to disperse its forces around the British Empire, Tirpitz believed Germany could achieve a balance of force that could seriously damage British naval hegemony. This was the heart of Tirpitz's "Risk Theory", which held that Britain would not challenge Germany if the latter's fleet posed such a significant threat to its own.

The primary component of the Fleet was its battleships, typically organized in eight-ship squadrons, though it also contained various other formations, including the I Scouting Group. At its creation in 1907, the High Seas Fleet consisted of two squadrons of battleships, and by 1914, a third squadron had been added. The dreadnought revolution in 1906 greatly affected the composition of the fleet; the twenty-four pre-dreadnoughts in the fleet were rendered obsolete and required replacement. Enough dreadnoughts for two full squadrons were completed by the outbreak of war in mid-1914; the eight most modern pre-dreadnoughts were used to constitute a third squadron. Two additional squadrons of older vessels were mobilized but later disbanded.

The fleet conducted a series of sorties into the North Sea during the war, designed to lure out an isolated portion of the numerically superior British Grand Fleet. These operations frequently used the fast battlecruisers of the I Scouting Group to raid the British coast as the bait for the Royal Navy. These operations culminated in the Battle of Jutland, on 31 May – 1 June 1916, where the High Seas Fleet confronted the whole of the Grand Fleet. The battle was inconclusive but it was a strategic victory for the British as it convinced Admiral Reinhard Scheer, the German fleet commander, that even a highly favorable outcome to a fleet action would not secure German victory in the war. Scheer and other senior admirals advised the Kaiser to order a resumption of the unrestricted submarine warfare campaign. The primary responsibility of the High Seas Fleet in 1917 and 1918 was to secure the German naval bases in the North Sea for U-boat operations. The fleet continued to conduct sorties into the North Sea and detached units for special operations in the Baltic Sea against the Russian Baltic Fleet. Following the German defeat in November 1918, the Allies interned the bulk of the High Seas Fleet in Scapa Flow, where it was ultimately scuttled in June 1919, days before the belligerents signed the Treaty of Versailles.

== Creation ==
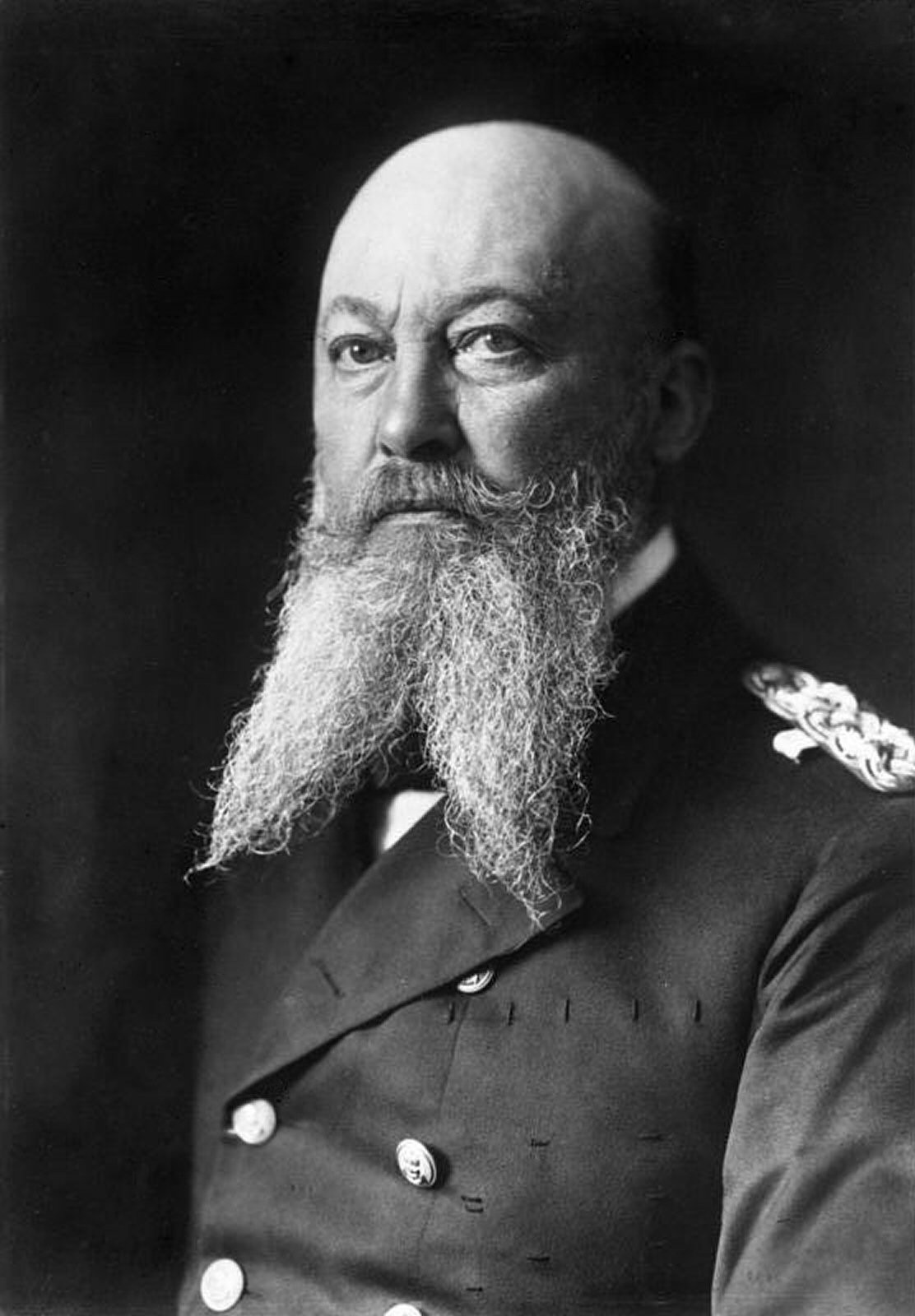
Alfred von Tirpitz

In 1898, Admiral Alfred von Tirpitz became the State Secretary for the Imperial Navy Office (Reichsmarineamt—RMA); Tirpitz was an ardent supporter of naval expansion. During a speech in support of the First Naval Law on 6 December 1897, Tirpitz stated that the navy was "a question of survival" for Germany. He also viewed Great Britain, with its powerful Royal Navy, as the primary threat to Germany. In a discussion with the Kaiser during his first month in his post as State Secretary, he stated that "for Germany the most dangerous naval enemy at present is England." Tirpitz theorized that an attacking fleet would require a 33 percent advantage in strength to achieve victory, and so decided that a 2:3 ratio would be required for the German navy. For a final total of 60 German battleships, Britain would be required to build 90 to meet the 2:3 ratio envisioned by Tirpitz.

The Royal Navy's "two-power standard", first formulated in the Naval Defence Act of 1889, required a larger fleet than those of the next two largest naval powers combined. The crux of Tirpitz's "risk theory" was that by building a fleet to the 2:3 ratio, Germany would be strong enough that even in the event of a British naval victory, the Royal Navy would incur damage so serious as to allow the third-ranked naval power to rise to preeminence. Implicit in Tirpitz's theory was the assumption that the British would adopt an offensive strategy that would allow the Germans to use mines and submarines to even the numerical odds before fighting a decisive battle between Heligoland and the Thames. Tirpitz believed Germany would emerge victorious from a naval struggle with Britain, as he believed Germany to possess superior ships operated by better-trained crews, more effective tactics, and led by more capable officers.

In his first program, Tirpitz envisioned a fleet of nineteen battleships, divided into two eight-ship squadrons, one ship as a flagship, and two in reserve. The squadrons were further divided into four-ship divisions. This would be supported by the eight Siegfried- and Odin classes of coastal defense ships, six large and eighteen small cruisers, and twelve divisions of torpedo boats, all assigned to the Home Fleet (Heimatflotte). This fleet was secured by the First Naval Law, which passed in the Reichstag on 28 March 1898. Construction of the fleet was to be complete by 1 April 1904. Rising international tensions, particularly as a result of the outbreak of the Boer War in South Africa and the Boxer Uprising in China, allowed Tirpitz to push through an expanded fleet plan in 1900. The Second Naval Law was passed on 14 June 1900; it doubled the size of the fleet to 38 battleships and 20 large and 38 small cruisers. Tirpitz planned an even larger fleet. As early as September 1899, he had informed the Kaiser that he sought at least 45 battleships, and potentially might secure a third double-squadron, for a total of 48 battleships.

=== Naval arms race ===
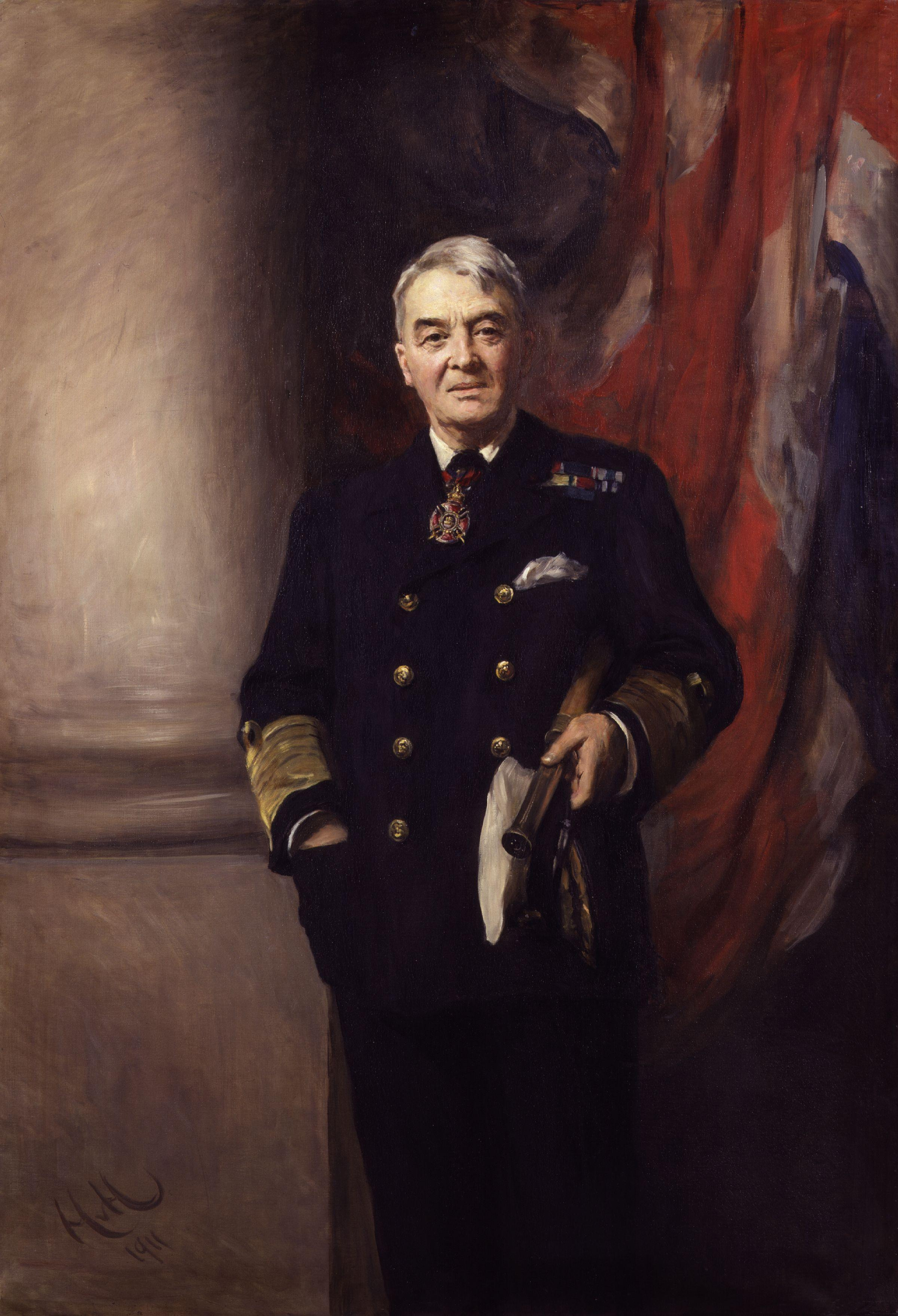
Admiral John Fisher

During the initial period of German naval expansion, Britain did not feel particularly threatened. The Lords of the Admiralty felt the implications of the Second Naval Law were not a significantly more dangerous threat than the fleet set by the First Naval Law; they believed it was more important to focus on the practical situation rather than speculation on future programs that might easily be reduced or cut entirely. Segments of the British public, however, quickly seized on the perceived threat posed by the German construction programs. Despite their dismissive reaction, the Admiralty resolved to surpass German battleship construction. Admiral John Fisher, who became the First Sea Lord and head of the Admiralty in 1904, introduced sweeping reforms in large part to counter the growing threat posed by the expanding German fleet. Training programs were modernized, old and obsolete vessels were discarded, and the scattered squadrons of battleships were consolidated into four main fleets, three of which were based in Europe. Britain also made a series of diplomatic arrangements, including an alliance with Japan that allowed a greater concentration of British battleships in the North Sea.

Fisher's reforms caused serious problems for Tirpitz's plans; he counted on a dispersal of British naval forces early in a conflict that would allow Germany's smaller but more concentrated fleet to achieve a local superiority. Tirpitz could also no longer depend on the higher level of training in both the German officer corps and the enlisted ranks, nor the superiority of the more modern and homogenized German squadrons over the heterogeneous British fleet. In 1904, Britain signed the Entente cordiale with France, Britain's primary naval rival. The destruction of two Russian fleets during the Russo-Japanese War in 1905 further strengthened Britain's position, as it removed the second of her two traditional naval rivals. These developments allowed Britain to discard the "two power standard" and focus solely on out-building Germany. In October 1906, Admiral Fisher stated "our only probable enemy is Germany. Germany keeps her whole Fleet always concentrated within a few hours of England. We must therefore keep a Fleet twice as powerful concentrated within a few hours of Germany."

The most damaging blow to Tirpitz's plan came with the launch of HMS Dreadnought in February 1906. The new battleship, armed with a main battery of ten 12-inch (30 cm) guns, was considerably more powerful than any battleship afloat. Ships capable of battle with Dreadnought would need to be significantly larger than the old pre-dreadnoughts, which increased their cost and necessitated expensive dredging of canals and harbors to accommodate them. The German naval budget was already stretched thin; without new funding, Tirpitz would have to abandon his challenge to Britain. As a result, Tirpitz went before the Reichstag in May 1906 with a request for additional funding. The First Amendment to the Second Naval Law was passed on 19 May and appropriated funding for the new battleships, as well as for the dredging required by their increased size.

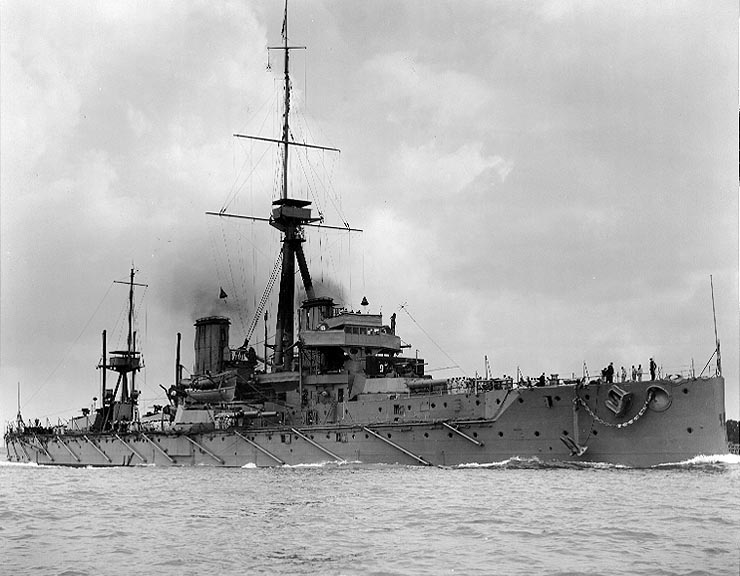
HMS Dreadnought underway, circa 1906–1907

The Reichstag passed a second amendment to the Naval Law in March 1908 to provide an additional billion marks to cope with the growing cost of the latest battleships. The law also reduced the service life of all battleships from 25 to 20 years, which allowed Tirpitz to push for the replacement of older vessels earlier. A third and final amendment was passed in May 1912 represented a compromise between Tirpitz and moderates in parliament. The amendment authorized three new battleships and two light cruisers. The amendment called for the High Seas Fleet to be equipped with three squadrons of eight battleships each, one squadron of eight battlecruisers, and eighteen light cruisers. Two 8-ship squadrons would be placed in reserve, along with two armored and twelve light cruisers. By the outbreak of war in August 1914, only one eight-ship squadron of dreadnoughts—the I Battle Squadron—had been assembled with the Nassau and Helgoland-class battleships. The second squadron of dreadnoughts—the III Battle Squadron—which included four of the Kaiser-class battleships, was only completed when the four König-class battleships entered service by early 1915. As a result, the third squadron—the II Battle Squadron remained composed of pre-dreadnoughts through 1916.

Before the 1912 naval law was passed, Britain and Germany attempted to reach a compromise with the Haldane Mission, led by the British War Minister Richard Haldane. The arms reduction mission ended in failure, however, and the 1912 law was announced shortly thereafter. The Germans were aware at as early as 1911, the Royal Navy had abandoned the idea of a decisive battle with the German fleet, in favor of a distant blockade at the entrances to the North Sea, which the British could easily control due to their geographical position. There emerged the distinct possibility that the German fleet would be unable to force a battle on its own terms, which would render it militarily useless. When the war came in 1914, the British did in fact adopt this strategy. Coupled with the restrictive orders of the Kaiser, who preferred to keep the fleet intact to be used as a bargaining chip in the peace settlements, the ability of the High Seas Fleet to affect the military situation was markedly reduced.

== Strategy ==
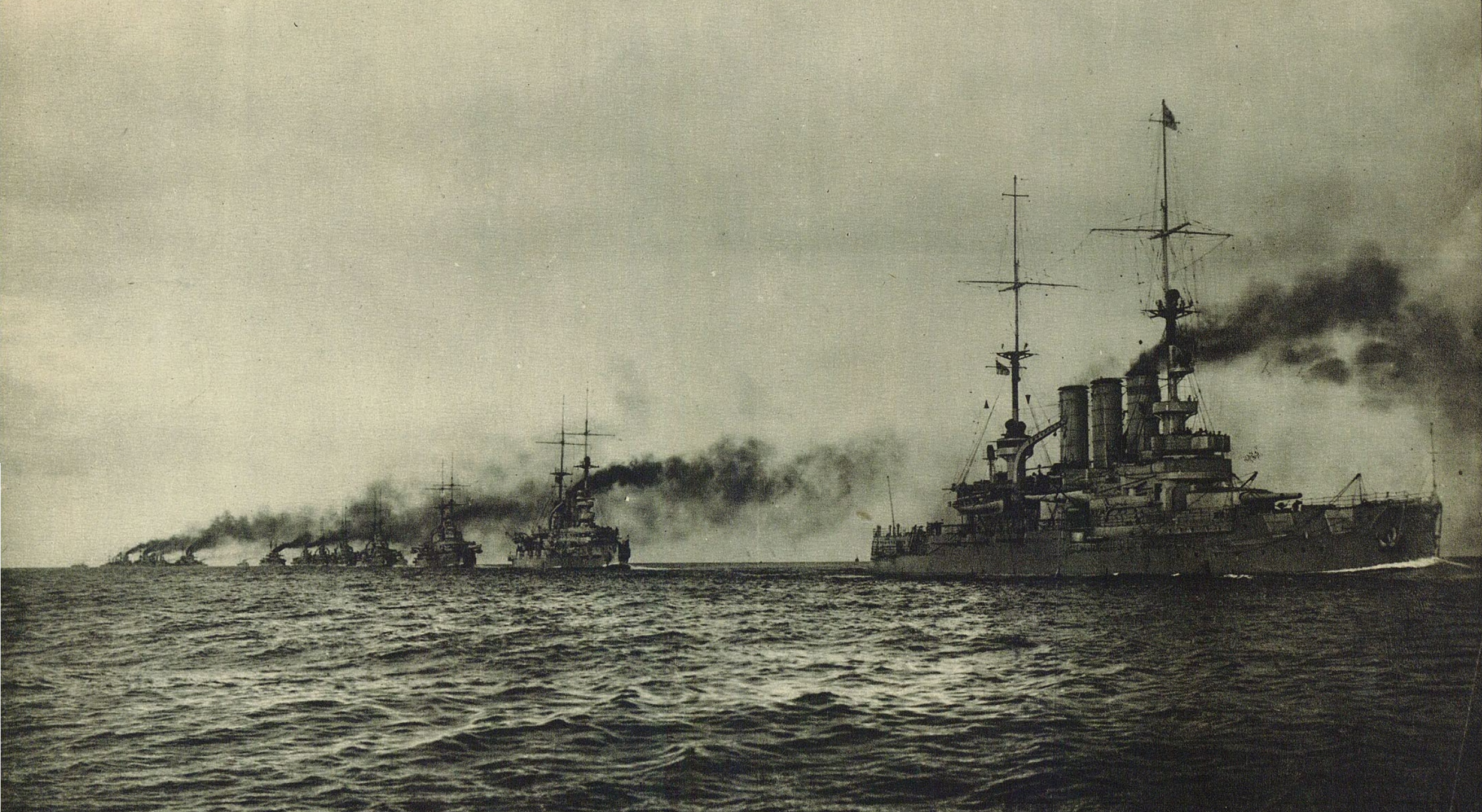
Prewar photo of the High Seas Fleet—a member of the Braunschweig class leads the line

The German Navy's pre-war planning held that the British would be compelled to mount either a direct attack on the German coast to defeat the High Seas Fleet, or to put in place a close blockade. Either course of action would permit the Germans to whittle away at the numerical superiority of the Grand Fleet with submarines and torpedo boats. Once a rough equality of forces could be achieved, the High Seas Fleet would be able to attack and destroy the British fleet. Implicit in Tirpitz's strategy was the assumption that German vessels were better-designed, had better-trained crews, and would be employed with superior tactics. In addition, Tirpitz assumed that Britain would not be able to concentrate its fleet in the North Sea, owing to the demands of its global empire. At the start of a conflict between the two powers, the Germans would therefore be able to attack the Royal Navy with local superiority.

The British, however, did not accommodate Tirpitz's projections; from his appointment as the First Sea Lord in 1904, Fisher began a major reorganization of the Royal Navy. He concentrated British battleship strength in home waters, launched the Dreadnought revolution, and introduced rigorous training for the fleet personnel. In 1912, the British concluded a joint defense agreement with France that allowed the British to concentrate in the North Sea while the French defended the Mediterranean. Worse still, the British began developing the strategy of the distant blockade of Germany starting in 1904; this removed the ability of German light craft to reduce Britain's superiority in numbers and essentially invalidated German naval planning before the start of World War I.

== Logistics and personnel ==
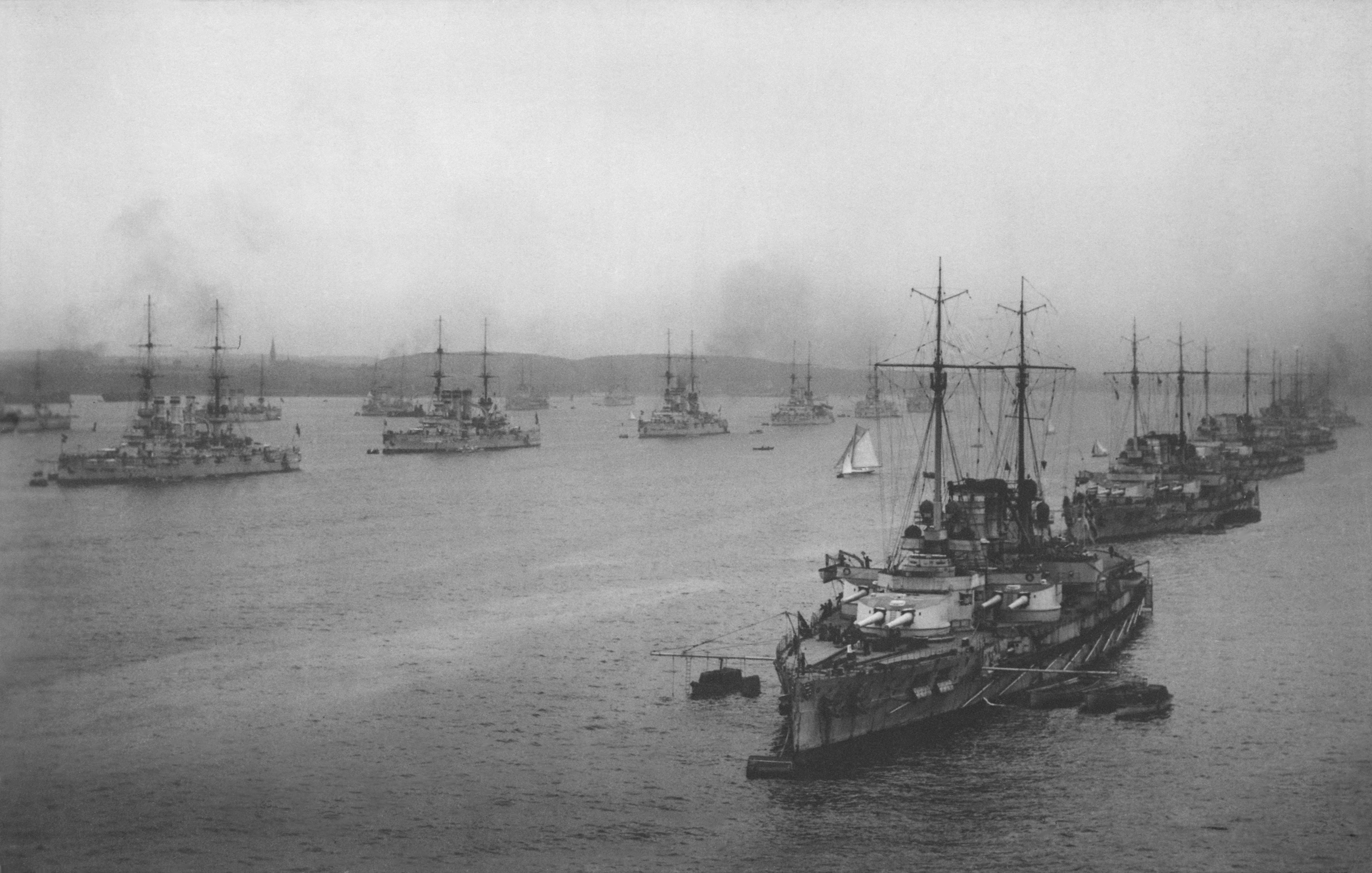
The I and II Squadrons of the High Seas Fleet in Kiel

The primary base for the High Seas Fleet in the North Sea was Wilhelmshaven on the western side of the Jade Bight; the port of Cuxhaven, located on the mouth of the Elbe, was also a major base in the North Sea. The island of Heligoland provided a fortified forward position in the German Bight. Kiel was the most important base in the Baltic, which supported the forward bases at Pillau and Danzig. The Kaiser Wilhelm Canal through Schleswig-Holstein connected the Baltic and North Seas and allowed the German Navy to quickly shift naval forces between the two seas. In peacetime, all ships on active duty in the High Seas Fleet were stationed in Wilhelmshaven, Kiel, or Danzig. Germany possessed only one major overseas base, at Jiaozhou in China, where the East Asia Squadron was stationed.

Steam ships of the period, which burned coal to fire their boilers, were naturally tied to coaling stations in friendly ports. The German Navy lacked sufficient overseas bases for sustained operations, even for single ships operating as commerce raiders. The Navy experimented with a device to transfer coal from colliers to warships while underway in 1907, though the practice was not put into general use. Nevertheless, German capital ships had a cruising range of at least 4,000 nmi (7,400 km; 4,600 mi), more than enough to operate in the Atlantic Ocean. (Note: For example, the battlecruiser Moltke visited the United States in mid 1912, and a flotilla consisting of the battleships Kaiser and König Albert and the light cruiser Strassburg sailed around South America as far as Valparaíso, Chile. In addition, the High Seas Fleet conducted several training cruises into the mid-Atlantic in 1908–1911.)

In 1897, the year Tirpitz came to his position as State Secretary of the Navy Office, the Imperial Navy consisted of a total of around 26,000 officers, petty officers, and enlisted men of various ranks, branches, and positions. By the outbreak of war in 1914, this had increased significantly to about 80,000 officers, petty officers, and men. Capital ships were typically commanded by a Kapitän zur See ('Captain at Sea') or Korvettenkapitän ('corvette captain'). Each of these ships typically had a total crew in excess of 1,000 officers and men; the light cruisers that screened for the fleet had crew sizes between 300 and 550. The fleet torpedo boats had crews of about 80 to 100 officers and men, though some later classes approached 200.

== History ==
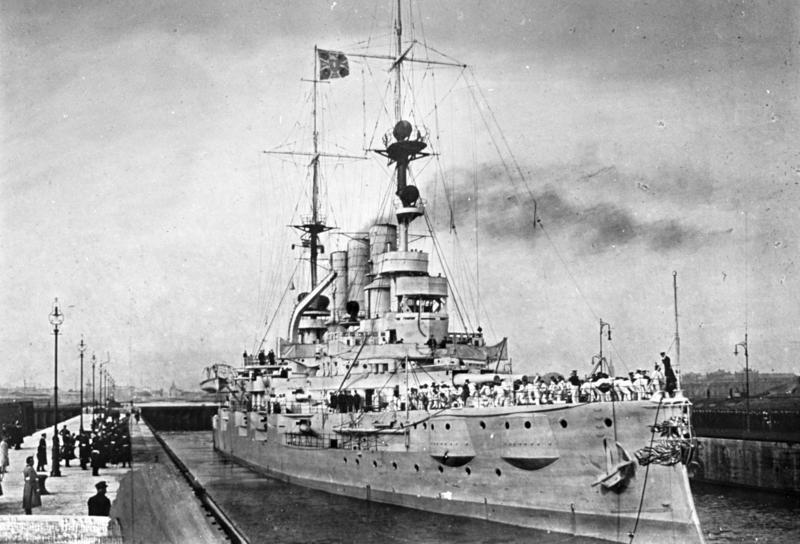
SMS Deutschland, the first flagship of the High Seas Fleet

In early 1907, enough battleships—of the Braunschweig and Deutschland classes—had been constructed to allow for the creation of a second full squadron. On 16 February 1907, Kaiser Wilhelm renamed the Home Fleet the High Seas Fleet. Admiral Prince Heinrich of Prussia, Wilhelm II's brother, became the first commander of the High Seas Fleet; his flagship was SMS Deutschland. While on a peacetime footing, the Fleet conducted a routine pattern of training exercises, with individual ships, with squadrons, and with the combined fleet, throughout the year. The entire fleet conducted several cruises into the Atlantic Ocean and the Baltic Sea. Prince Henry was replaced in late 1909 by Vice Admiral Henning von Holtzendorff, who served until April 1913. Vice Admiral Friedrich von Ingenohl, who would command the High Seas Fleet in the first months of World War I, took command following the departure of Holtzendorff. SMS Friedrich der Grosse replaced Deutschland as the fleet flagship on 2 March 1913.

Despite the rising international tensions following the assassination of Archduke Franz Ferdinand on 28 June, the High Seas Fleet began its summer cruise to Norway on 13 July. During the last peacetime cruise of the Imperial Navy, the fleet conducted drills off Skagen before proceeding to the Norwegian fjords on 25 July. The following day the fleet began to steam back to Germany, as a result of Austria-Hungary's ultimatum to Serbia. On the 27th, the entire fleet assembled off Cape Skudenes before returning to port, where the ships remained at a heightened state of readiness. War between Austria-Hungary and Serbia broke out the following day, and in the span of a week all of the major European powers had joined the conflict.

=== World War I ===
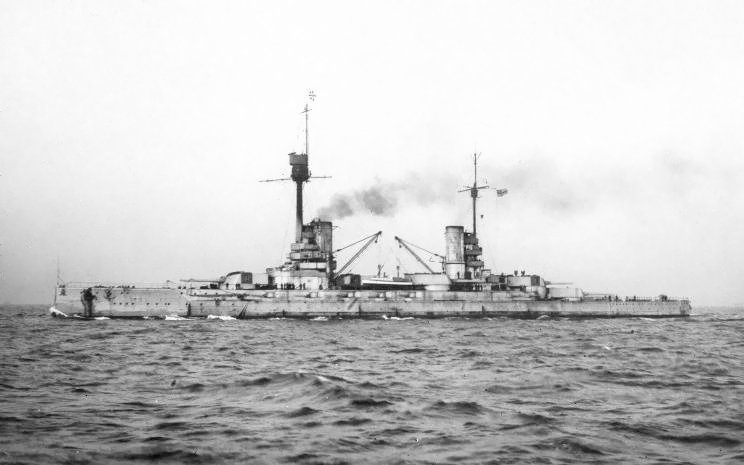
Friedrich der Grosse, the second flagship of the High Seas Fleet

The High Seas Fleet conducted a number of sweeps and advances into the North Sea. The first occurred on 2–3 November 1914, though no British forces were encountered. Ingenohl, the commander of the High Seas Fleet, adopted a strategy in which the battlecruisers of Rear Admiral Franz von Hipper's I Scouting Group raided British coastal towns to lure out portions of the Grand Fleet where they could be destroyed by the High Seas Fleet. The raid on Scarborough, Hartlepool and Whitby on 15–16 December 1914 was the first such operation. On the evening of 15 December, the German battle fleet of some twelve dreadnoughts and eight pre-dreadnoughts came to within 10 nmi (19 km; 12 mi) of an isolated squadron of six British battleships. However, skirmishes between the rival destroyer screens in the darkness convinced Ingenohl that he was faced with the entire Grand Fleet. Under orders from the Kaiser to avoid risking the fleet unnecessarily, Ingenohl broke off the engagement and turned the fleet back toward Germany.

Following the loss of SMS Blücher at the Battle of Dogger Bank in January 1915, the Kaiser removed Ingenohl from his post on 2 February. Admiral Hugo von Pohl replaced him as commander of the fleet. Pohl conducted a series of fleet advances in 1915; in the first one on 29–30 March, the fleet steamed out to the north of Terschelling and returned without incident. Another followed on 17–18 April, where the fleet covered a mining operation by the II Scouting Group. Three days later, on 21–22 April, the High Seas Fleet advanced towards the Dogger Bank, though again failed to meet any British forces. Another sortie followed on 29–30 May, during which the fleet advanced as far as Schiermonnikoog before being forced to turn back by inclement weather. On 10 August, the fleet steamed to the north of Heligoland to cover the return of the auxiliary cruiser Meteor. A month later, on 11–12 September, the fleet covered another mine-laying operation off the Swarte Bank. The last operation of the year, conducted on 23–24 October, was an advance without result in the direction of Horns Reef.

Vice Admiral Reinhard Scheer became Commander in chief of the High Seas Fleet on 18 January 1916 when Pohl became too ill to continue in that post. Scheer favored a much more aggressive policy than that of his predecessor, and advocated greater usage of U-boats and zeppelins in coordinated attacks on the Grand Fleet; Scheer received approval from the Kaiser in February 1916 to carry out his intentions. Scheer ordered the fleet on sweeps of the North Sea on 26 March, 2–3 April, and 21–22 April. The battlecruisers conducted another raid on the English coast on 24–25 April, during which the fleet provided distant support. Scheer planned another raid for mid-May, but the battlecruiser Seydlitz had struck a mine during the previous raid and the repair work forced the operation to be pushed back until the end of the month.

==== Battle of Jutland ====
A König-class battleship firing her main guns at Jutland, by Claus Bergen

Admiral Scheer's fleet, composed of 16 dreadnoughts, six pre-dreadnoughts, six light cruisers, and 31 torpedo boats departed the Jade early on the morning of 31 May. The fleet sailed in concert with Hipper's five battlecruisers and supporting cruisers and torpedo boats. The Royal Navy's Room 40 had intercepted and decrypted German radio traffic containing plans of the operation. The Admiralty ordered the Grand Fleet, totaling some 28 dreadnoughts and 9 battlecruisers, to sortie the night before in order to cut off and destroy the High Seas Fleet.

At 16:00 UTC, the two battlecruiser forces encountered each other and began a running gun fight south, back towards Scheer's battle fleet. Upon reaching the High Seas Fleet, Vice Admiral David Beatty's battlecruisers turned back to the north to lure the Germans towards the rapidly approaching Grand Fleet, under the command of Admiral John Jellicoe. During the run to the north, Scheer's leading ships engaged the Queen Elizabeth-class battleships of the 5th Battle Squadron. By 18:30, the Grand Fleet had arrived on the scene, and was deployed into a position that would cross Scheer's "T" from the northeast. To extricate his fleet from this precarious position, Scheer ordered a 16-point turn to the south-west. At 18:55, Scheer decided to conduct another 16-point turn to launch an attack on the British fleet.

This maneuver again put Scheer in a dangerous position; Jellicoe had turned his fleet south and again crossed Scheer's "T". A third 16-point turn followed; Hipper's mauled battlecruisers charged the British line to cover the retreat. Scheer then ordered the fleet to adopt the night cruising formation, which was completed by 23:40. A series of ferocious engagements between Scheer's battleships and Jellicoe's destroyer screen ensued, though the Germans managed to punch their way through the destroyers and make for Horns Reef. The High Seas Fleet reached the Jade between 13:00 and 14:45 on 1 June; Scheer ordered the undamaged battleships of the I Battle Squadron to take up defensive positions in the Jade roadstead while the Kaiser-class battleships were to maintain a state of readiness just outside Wilhelmshaven. The High Seas Fleet had sunk more British vessels than the Grand Fleet had sunk German, though Scheer's leading battleships had taken a terrible hammering. Several capital ships, including SMS König, which had been the first vessel in the line, and most of the battlecruisers, were in drydock for extensive repairs for at least two months. On 1 June, the British had twenty-four capital ships in fighting condition, compared to only ten German warships.

==== Subsequent operations ====
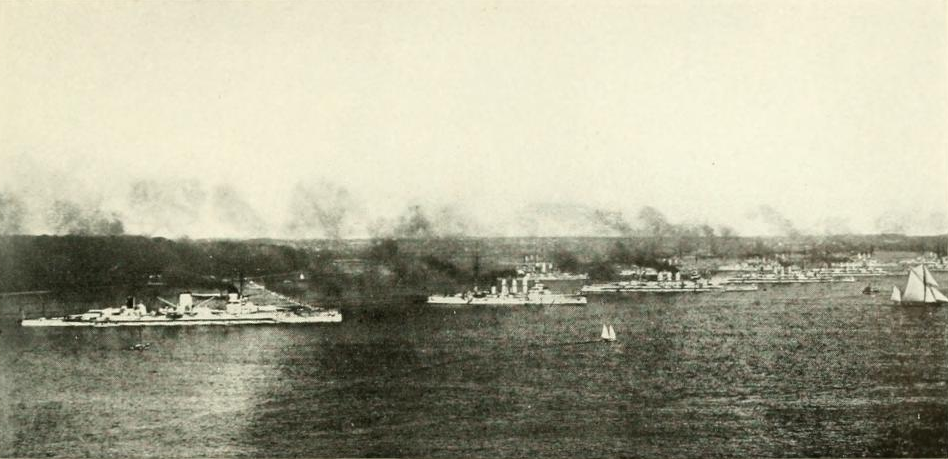
The High Seas Fleet in Kiel bay

By August, enough warships had been repaired to allow Scheer to undertake another fleet operation on 18–19 August. Due to the serious damage incurred by Seydlitz and SMS Derfflinger and the loss of SMS Lützow at Jutland, the only battlecruisers available for the operation were SMS Von der Tann and SMS Moltke, which were joined by SMS Markgraf, SMS Grosser Kurfürst, and the new battleship SMS Bayern. Scheer turned north after receiving a false report from a zeppelin about a British unit in the area. As a result, the bombardment was not carried out, and by 14:35, Scheer had been warned of the Grand Fleet's approach and so turned his forces around and retreated to German ports. Another fleet sortie took place on 18–19 October 1916 to attack enemy shipping east of Dogger Bank. Despite being forewarned by signal intelligence, the Grand Fleet did not attempt to intercept. The operation was however cancelled due to poor weather after the cruiser München was torpedoed by the British submarine HMS E38. The fleet was reorganized on 1 December; the four König-class battleships remained in the III Squadron, along with the newly commissioned Bayern, while the five Kaiser-class ships were transferred to the IV Squadron. In March 1917 the new battleship Baden, built to serve as fleet flagship, entered service; on the 17th, Scheer hauled down his flag from Friedrich der Grosse and transferred it to Baden.

The war, now in its fourth year, was by 1917 taking its toll on the crews of the ships of the High Seas Fleet. Acts of passive resistance, such as the posting of anti-war slogans in the battleships SMS Oldenburg and SMS Posen in January 1917, began to appear. In June and July, the crews began to conduct more active forms of resistance. These activities included work refusals, hunger strikes, and taking unauthorized leave from their ships. The disruptions came to a head in August, when a series of protests, anti-war speeches, and demonstrations resulted in the arrest of dozens of sailors. Scheer ordered the arrest of over 200 men from the battleship Prinzregent Luitpold, the center of the anti-war activities. A series of courts-martial followed, which resulted in 77 guilty verdicts; nine men were sentenced to death for their roles, though only two men, Albin Köbis and Max Reichpietsch, were executed.

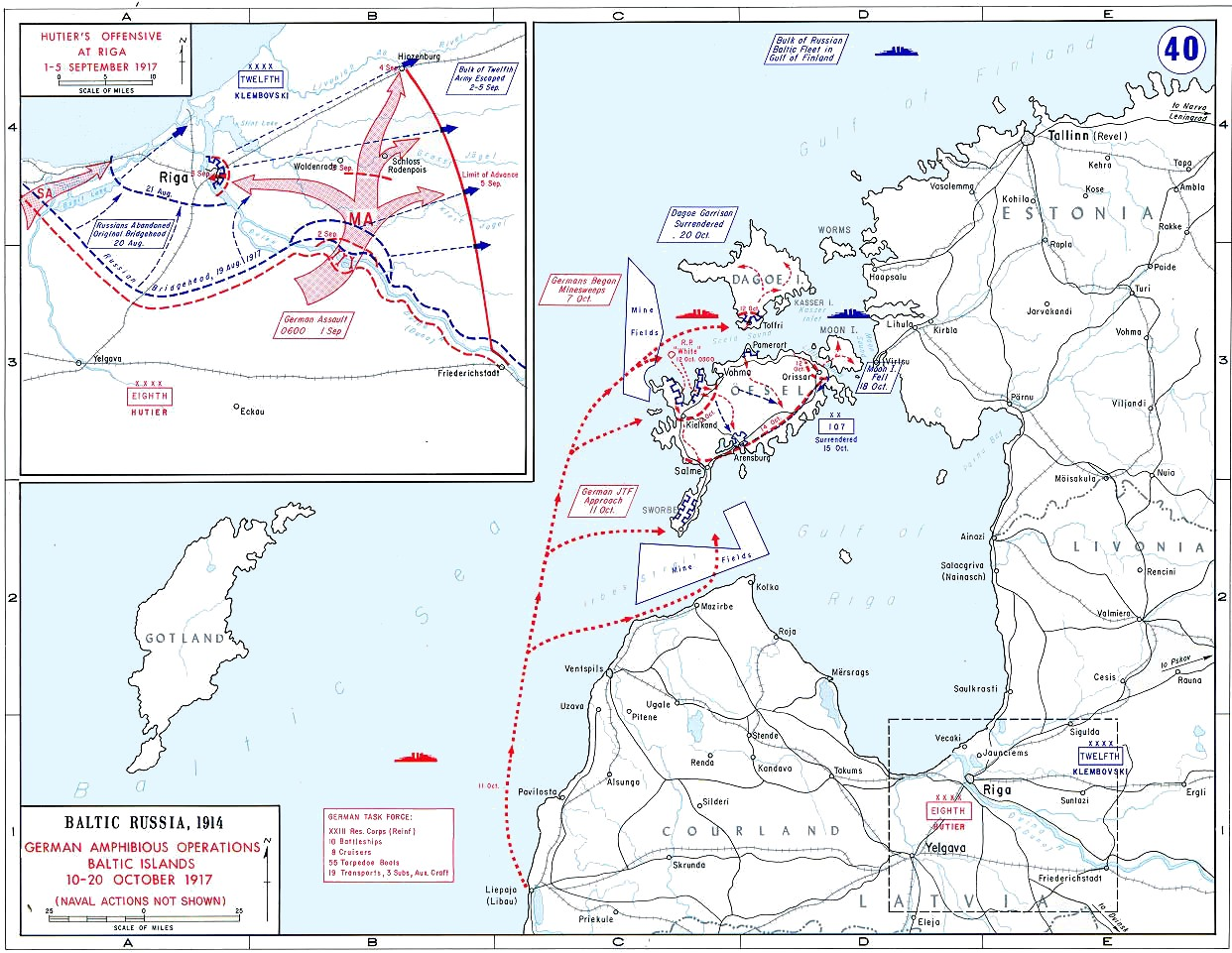
Movements of the German fleet during Operation Albion

In early September 1917, following the German conquest of the Russian port of Riga, the German navy decided to eliminate the Russian naval forces that still held the Gulf of Riga. The Navy High Command (Admiralstab) planned an operation, codenamed Operation Albion, to seize the Baltic island of Ösel, and specifically the Russian gun batteries on the Sworbe Peninsula. On 18 September, the order was issued for a joint operation with the army to capture Ösel and Moon Islands; the primary naval component was to comprise its flagship, Moltke, and the III and IV Battle Squadrons of the High Seas Fleet. The operation began on the morning of 12 October, when Moltke and the III Squadron ships engaged Russian positions in Tagga Bay while the IV Squadron shelled Russian gun batteries on the Sworbe Peninsula on Ösel. By 20 October, the fighting on the islands was winding down; Moon, Ösel, and Dagö were in German possession. The previous day, the Admiralstab had ordered the cessation of naval actions and the return of the dreadnoughts to the High Seas Fleet as soon as possible.

Admiral Scheer had used light surface forces to attack British convoys to Norway beginning in late 1917. As a result, the Royal Navy attached a squadron of battleships to protect the convoys, which presented Scheer with the possibility of destroying a detached squadron of the Grand Fleet. The operation called for Hipper's battlecruisers to attack the convoy and its escorts on 23 April while the battleships of the High Seas Fleet stood by in support. On 22 April, the German fleet assembled in the Schillig Roads outside Wilhelmshaven and departed the following morning. Despite the success in reaching the convoy route undetected, the operation failed due to faulty intelligence. Reports from U-boats indicated to Scheer that the convoys sailed at the start and middle of each week, but a west-bound convoy had left Bergen on Tuesday the 22nd and an east-bound group left Methil, Scotland, on the 24th, a Thursday. As a result, there was no convoy for Hipper to attack. Beatty sortied with a force of 31 battleships and four battlecruisers, but was too late to intercept the retreating Germans. The Germans reached their defensive minefields early on 25 April, though approximately 40 nmi (74 km; 46 mi) off Heligoland Moltke was torpedoed by the submarine E42; she successfully returned to port.

=== Internment at Scapa Flow ===
A final fleet action was planned for the end of October 1918, days before the Armistice was to take effect. The bulk of the High Seas Fleet was to have sortied from their base in Wilhelmshaven to engage the British Grand Fleet; Scheer—by now the Grand Admiral (Grossadmiral) of the fleet—intended to inflict as much damage as possible on the British navy, in order to retain a better bargaining position for Germany, despite the expected casualties. However, many of the war-weary sailors felt the operation would disrupt the peace process and prolong the war. On the morning of 29 October 1918, the order was given to sail from Wilhelmshaven the following day. Starting on the night of 29 October, sailors on Thüringen and then on several other battleships mutinied. The unrest forced Hipper and Scheer to cancel the operation. When informed of the situation, the Kaiser stated "I no longer have a navy".

Locations of the scuttled ships

Ten days after the capitulation of Germany and the signing of the Armistice of 11 November 1918, the High Seas Fleet officially surrendered in the Firth of Forth, near Rosyth, Scotland. It was the largest gathering of warships the world had ever seen in one place at one time. This British operation here was officially called Operation ZZ.

Most of the High Seas Fleet, under the command of Rear Admiral Ludwig von Reuter, were then taken to the British naval base of Scapa Flow. Prior to the departure of the German fleet, Admiral Adolf von Trotha made clear to Reuter that he could not allow the Allies to seize the ships, under any conditions. The fleet rendezvoused with the British light cruiser Cardiff, which led the ships to the Allied fleet that was to escort the Germans to Scapa Flow. The massive flotilla consisted of some 370 British, American, and French warships. Once the ships were interned, their guns were disabled through the removal of their breech blocks, and their crews were reduced to 200 officers and enlisted men on each of the capital ships. On 10 January 1919, the High Seas Fleet was formally disbanded.

The fleet remained in captivity during the negotiations that ultimately produced the Treaty of Versailles. Reuter believed that the British intended to seize the German ships on 21 June 1919, which was the deadline for Germany to have signed the peace treaty. Unaware that the deadline had been extended to the 23rd, Reuter ordered the ships to be sunk at the next opportunity. On the morning of 21 June, the British fleet left Scapa Flow to conduct training maneuvers, and at 11:20 Reuter transmitted the order to his ships. Out of the interned fleet, only one battleship, Baden, three light cruisers, and eighteen destroyers were saved from sinking by the British harbor personnel. The Royal Navy, initially opposed to salvage operations, decided to allow private firms to attempt to raise the vessels for scrapping. Cox and Danks, a company founded by Ernest Cox handled most of the salvage operations, including those of the heaviest vessels raised. After Cox's withdrawal due to financial losses in the early 1930s, Metal Industries Group, Inc. took over the salvage operation for the remaining ships. Five more capital ships were raised, though three—SMS König, SMS Kronprinz, and SMS Markgraf—were too deep to permit raising. They remain on the bottom of Scapa Flow, along with four light cruisers.

== Legacy ==
The High Seas Fleet, particularly its wartime impotence and ultimate fate, strongly influenced the later German navies, the Reichsmarine and Kriegsmarine. Former Imperial Navy officers continued to serve in the subsequent institutions, including Admiral Erich Raeder, Hipper's former chief of staff, who became the commander in chief of the Reichsmarine. Raeder advocated long-range commerce raiding by surface ships, rather than constructing a large surface fleet to challenge the Royal Navy, which he viewed to be a futile endeavor. His initial version of Plan Z, the construction program for the Kriegsmarine in the late 1930s, called for large number of P-class cruisers, long-range light cruisers, and reconnaissance forces for attacking enemy shipping, though he was overruled by Adolf Hitler, who preferred a large fleet of battleships.

== See also ==
- Organization of the High Seas Fleet at the Battle of Jutland.
- Organization of the High Seas Fleet in late October 1918.
