= A. Köbis (1974 yacht) =

German yacht

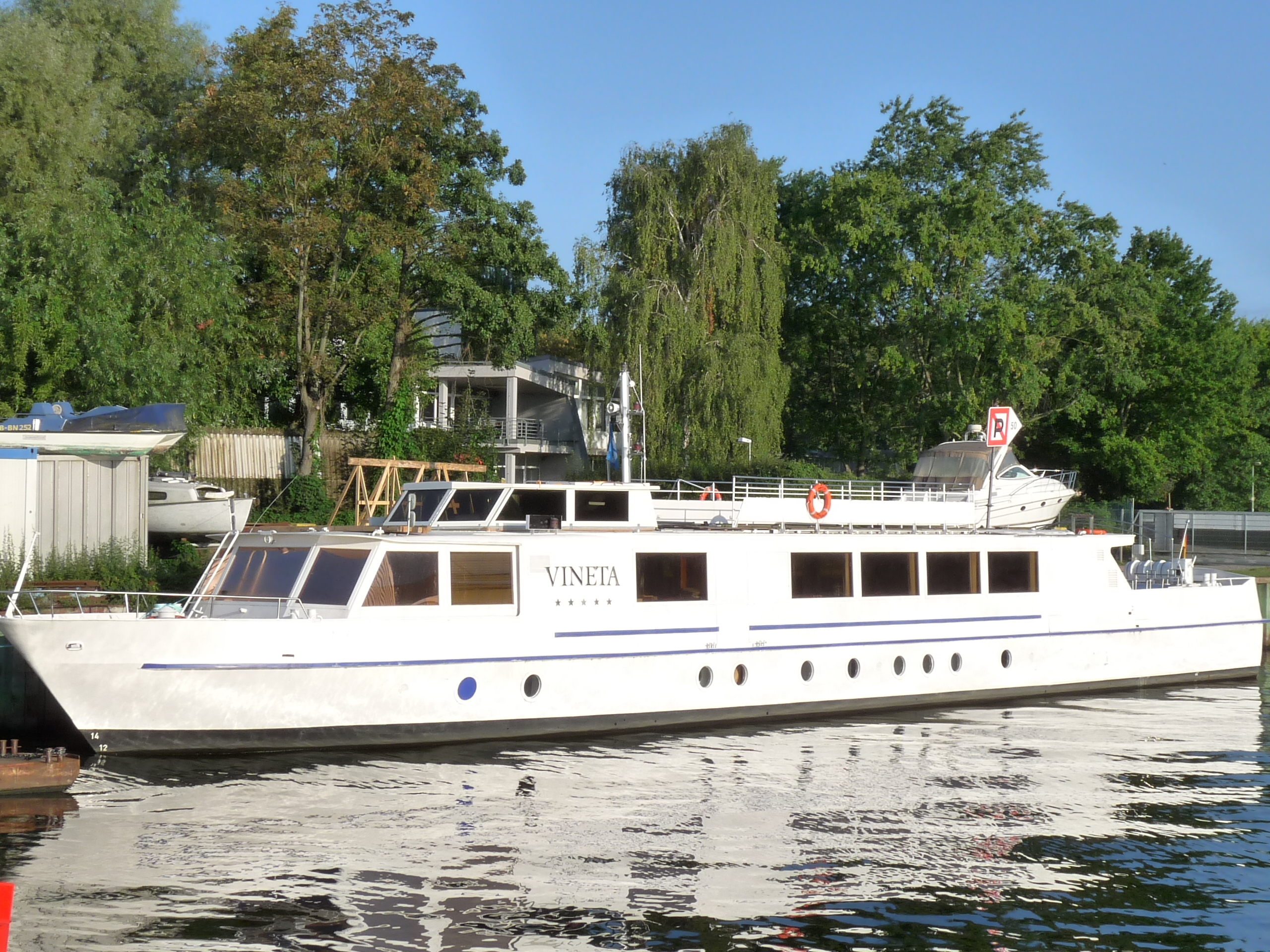
- As Vineta in summer 2017 in Berlin-Spandau on the Havel

History
- Name: A. Köbis
- Owner: 1974–Major General Markus Wolf, head of the GDR's foreign intelligence service 2018–Flux Ahoi sailing school
- Builder: VEB Yachtwerft
- Launched: October 1, 1974

General characteristics
- Type: Yacht
- Length: 35m
- Installed power: Two 178-hp MAN diesels

A. Köbis, which was launched in 1974, is a German motor yacht and former state yacht of the German Democratic Republic. It was named after the sailor Albin Köbis, who was famous for his participation in a mutiny during the First World War. It is classed as a sports boat and is suited only to inland waterways. It has a large conference room but no sleeping cabins, with a capacity for 50 guests. It had a West German engine and a British radar system. The ship was mainly used by head of state Erich Honecker on the Spree river and for hosting guests including Daniel Ortega and Muammar Gaddafi.

The yacht replaced the earlier Albin Köbis which was launched in 1952. Compared to its stylish wood-fitted predecessor, the yacht is a "plug-ugly, rectangular steel box", according to GDR boatbuilding expert Uwe Giesler.

The ship was later renamed Vineta and was auctioned in 2014. In 2018, she returned to Berlin and was purchased by the Flux Ahoi sailing school.

== Other vessels named Albin Köbis ==
- Albin Köbis (ship, 1948) sailing vessel
- Albin Köbis (yacht), 1952 sailing vessel
