= Albin Köbis (yacht) =

Ship, commissioning 1952

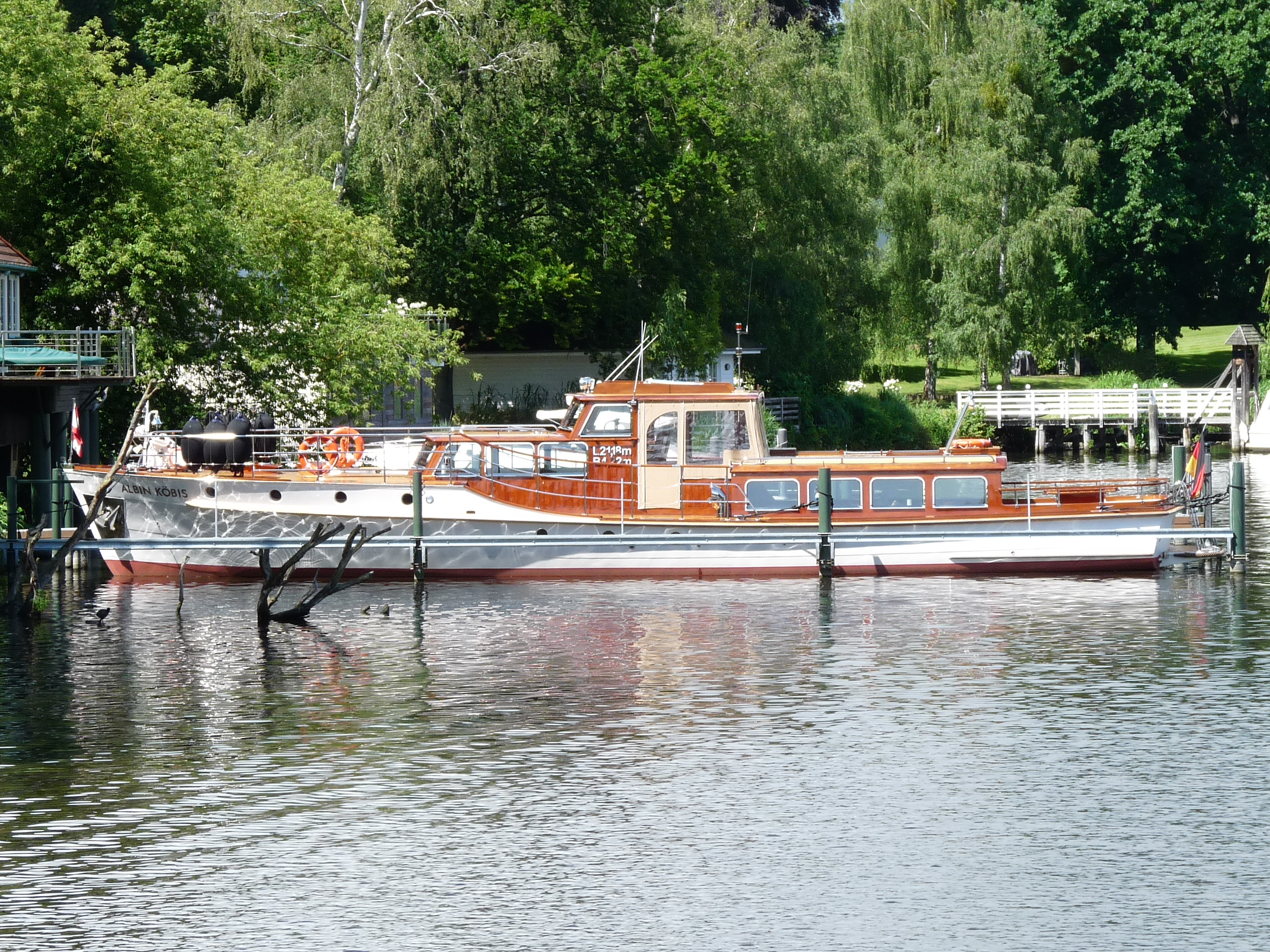
- Albin Köbis in 2014.

History
- Owner: Council of Ministers of the GDR (1952–1990) Berlin water police (1990–1995) private ownership (1995–current)
- Ordered: 1952
- Builder: VEB Yachtwerft
- Reclassified: 1990, Freundschaft 1995, La Belle

General characteristics
- Length: 20m

MY Albin Köbis was built in 1952 by Engelbrecht-Werft in Berlin-Köpenick on order by Wilhelm Pieck and served as the presidential yacht of the German Democratic Republic (GDR) until 1971 when it was replaced by MY Ostseeland. It was named in honour of Albin Köbis, a German sailor and revolutionary during World War I.

When Fidel Castro visited the GDR, MY Albin Köbis apparently struck a bridge during a cruise on the lakes of East-Berlin. After reunification the yacht briefly served with the Wasserschutzpolizei renamed Freundschaft (Friendship). In 1995 the ship was sold for 180.000 D-Mark in an auction and renamed La Belle (for the discotheque bombed by Libyans in 1986). In 2009, the ship was acquired by a private person and restored after having sunk in the meantime.

== Other vessels named Albin Köbis ==
- A. Köbis (1974 yacht), the successor vessel to MY Albin Köbis
- Albin Köbis (ship, 1948) sailing vessel
