= Max Reichpietsch =

German sailor in WWI

Max Reichpietsch

Max Reichpietsch (German pronunciation: [ˈmaks ˈʁaɪ̯çpiːtʃ]; 24 October 1894 – 5 September 1917) was a German sailor executed in 1917 for socialist agitation in the Imperial German Navy.

== Life ==
Born in the town of Charlottenburg into a family of New Apostolic Christians, he joined the navy as a volunteer in 1912 and served on the battleship SMS Friedrich der Grosse during World War I. He took part in the bloody Battle of Jutland and, like his comrades, suffered from poor catering and harassments on the part of the naval officers.

In the summer of 1917, Reichpietsch became one of the leaders of a revolutionary movement among the sailors in the Imperial fleet whose complaints about food and other conditions soon developed into agitation against the war. He was arrested and condemned to death by a court martial in Wilhelmshaven on 26 August 1917 as the "main ringleader", along with Albin Köbis and three other sailors. The sentences on the other three were commuted to penal servitude, but Reichpietsch and Köbis were executed by firing squad at the Wahner Heide proving ground near Cologne, on 5 September 1917.

== Commemoration ==
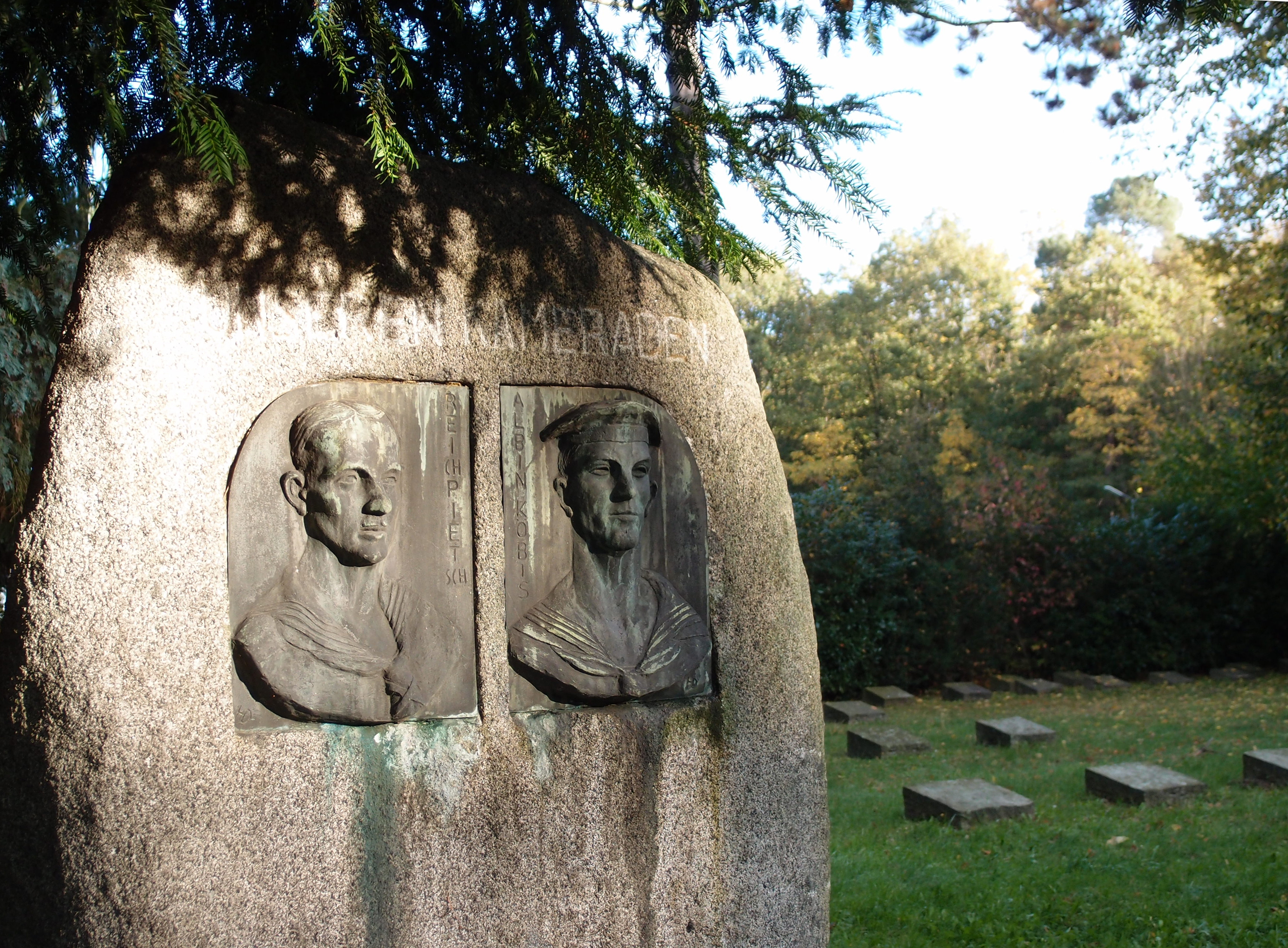
Max Reichpietsch (left) and his associate Albin Köbis.

The executions were denounced as "naval judicial murders" by antiwar politicians and newspapers, and helped trigger the antiwar and socialist mutinies in the Navy, which led to the German Revolution of 1918–19. This has made Reichpietsch and Köbis heroes of the German socialist movement. The author Theodor Plievier, himself a sailor in World War I and participant of the marine's mutiny, devoted his 1930 novel The Kaiser’s Coolies to them.

After World War II, the name of the Berlin street on which the former German Imperial Naval Office was located in the Bendlerblock was changed from Tirpitzufer (after Admiral Alfred von Tirpitz) to Reichpietschufer in honour of Max Reichpietsch, and a nearby street was named Köbisstrasse. There is also a Max-Reichpietsch-Platz in Kiel, and streets named Reichpietschstrasse in Cologne and Leipzig.

The shooting of Reichpietsch and Köbis is the starting point for the story of the East German film The Sailor's Song (1958). A television play about the case, Marinemeuterei 1917, was shown on West German television in 1969, directed by Hermann Kugelstadt and starring Karl-Heinz von Hassel as Reichpietsch and Dieter Wilken as Köbis.

== See also ==
- German Revolution
- (in French) Soldat fusillé pour l'exemple
