= Albin Köbis =

German sailor executed in 1917 for anti-war agitation

Albin Köbis

Albin Köbis (18 December 1892 – 5 September 1917) was a German sailor executed in 1917 for incitement to rebellion in the Imperial German Navy.

== Life ==
Köbis was born in Reinickendorf which was incorporated into Berlin in 1920. He worked as a mechanic and as a sailor on merchant ships until he enlisted as a volunteer in 1912. In the Imperial German Navy he served as a stoker on the battleship Prinzregent Luitpold. In the summer of 1917, he became one of the leaders of a movement among sailors in the imperial fleet, whose complaints about food and other conditions soon developed into agitation against the war. He was arrested and condemned to death for incitement to rebellion on 26 August 1917 as a main ringleader along with Max Reichpietsch and three other sailors. The sentences on the other three were commuted to penal servitude, but Köbis and Reichpietsch were executed by firing squad on 5 September 1917.

These executions were denounced as naval judicial murders by Marxist politicians and newspapers, and helped trigger the Naval Mutinies of 1918, which led to the German Revolution of 1918–1919. This has made Köbis and Reichpietsch heroes of the German socialist movement.

== Commemoration ==
After World War II the name of a street in Berlin-Tiergarten was renamed Köbisstrasse.

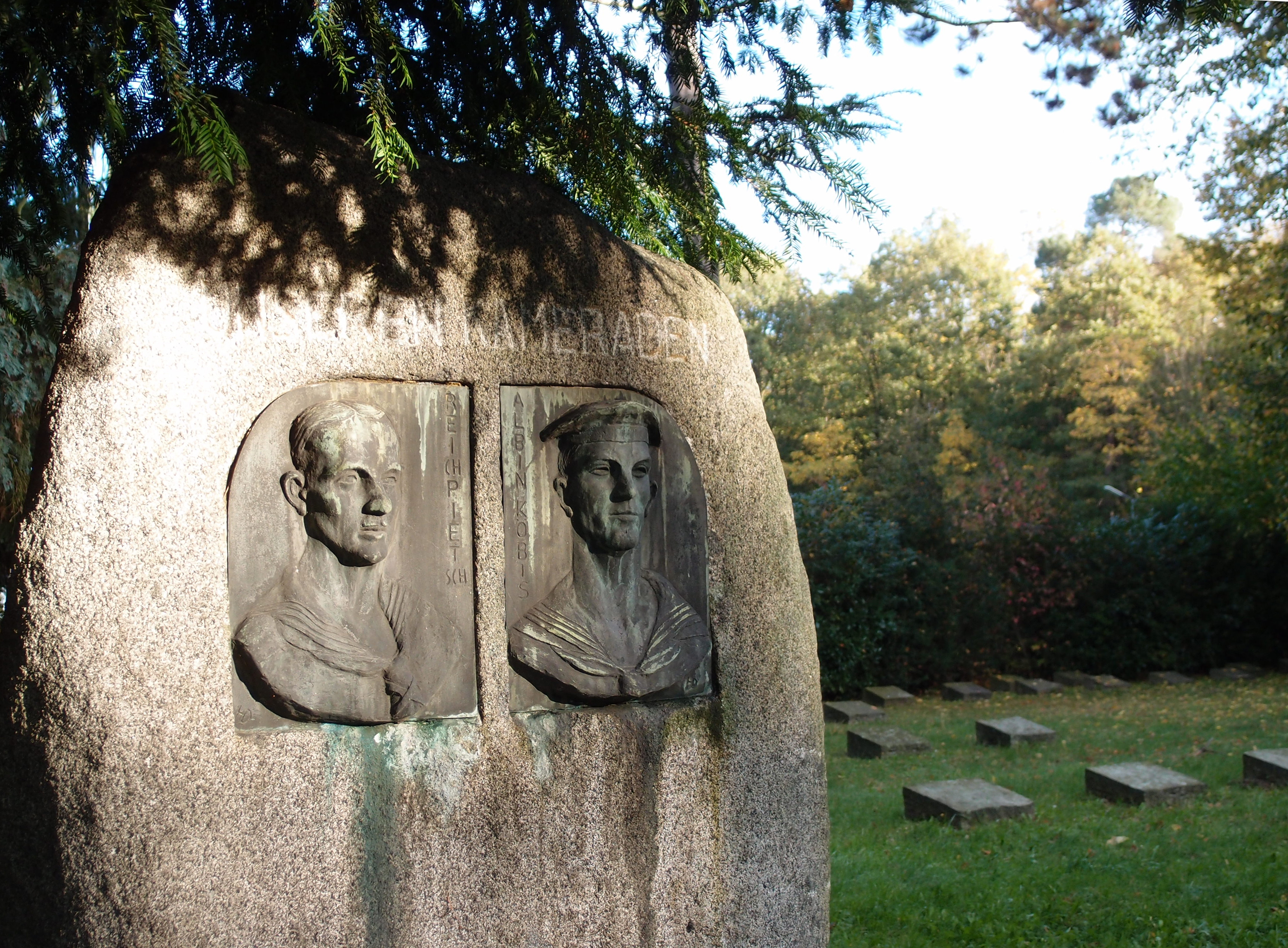
Monument for Albin Köbis and Max Reichpietsch, military cemetery Wahner Heide near Cologne

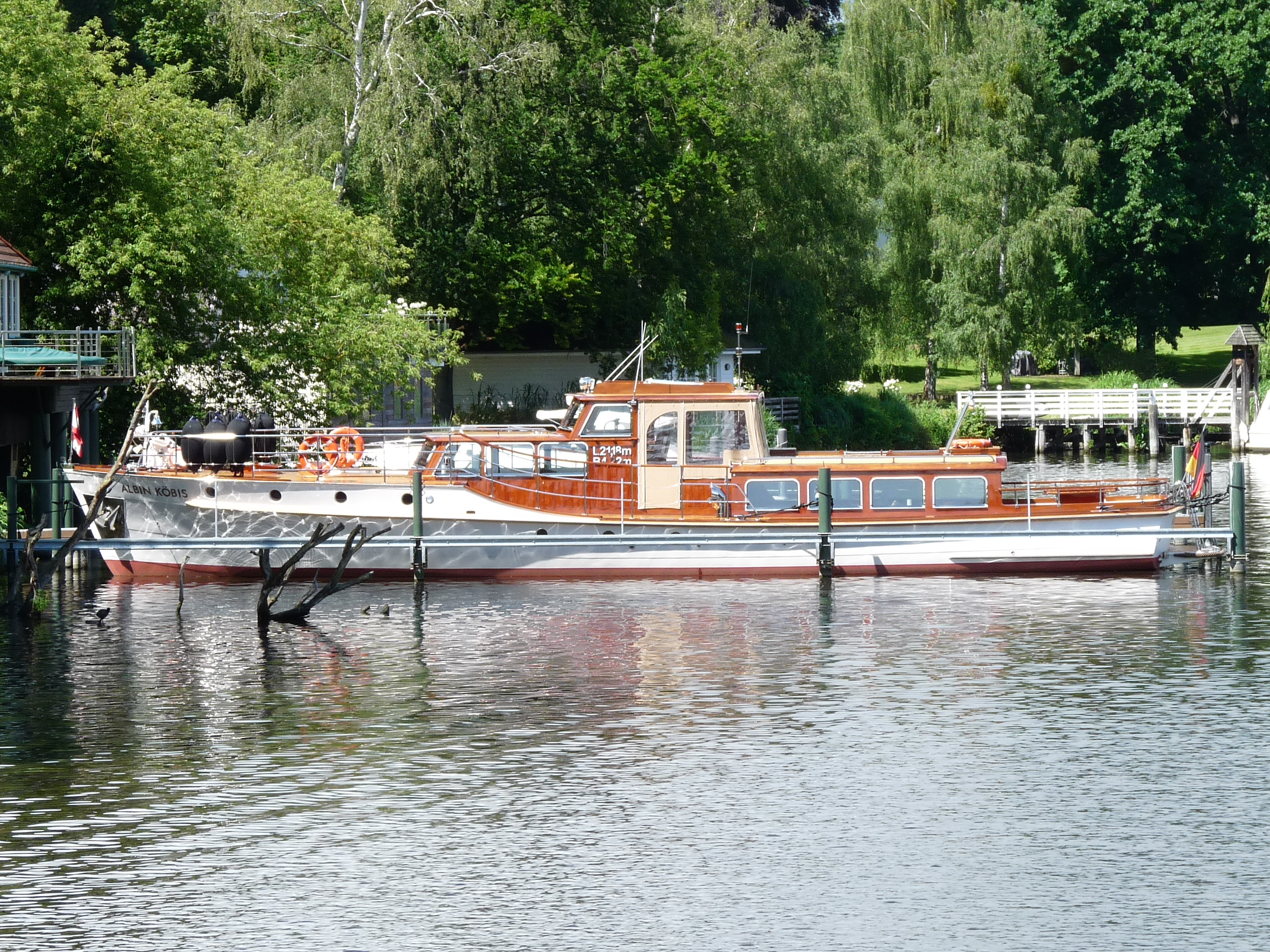
MY Albin Köbis served as the presidential yacht of the German Democratic Republic

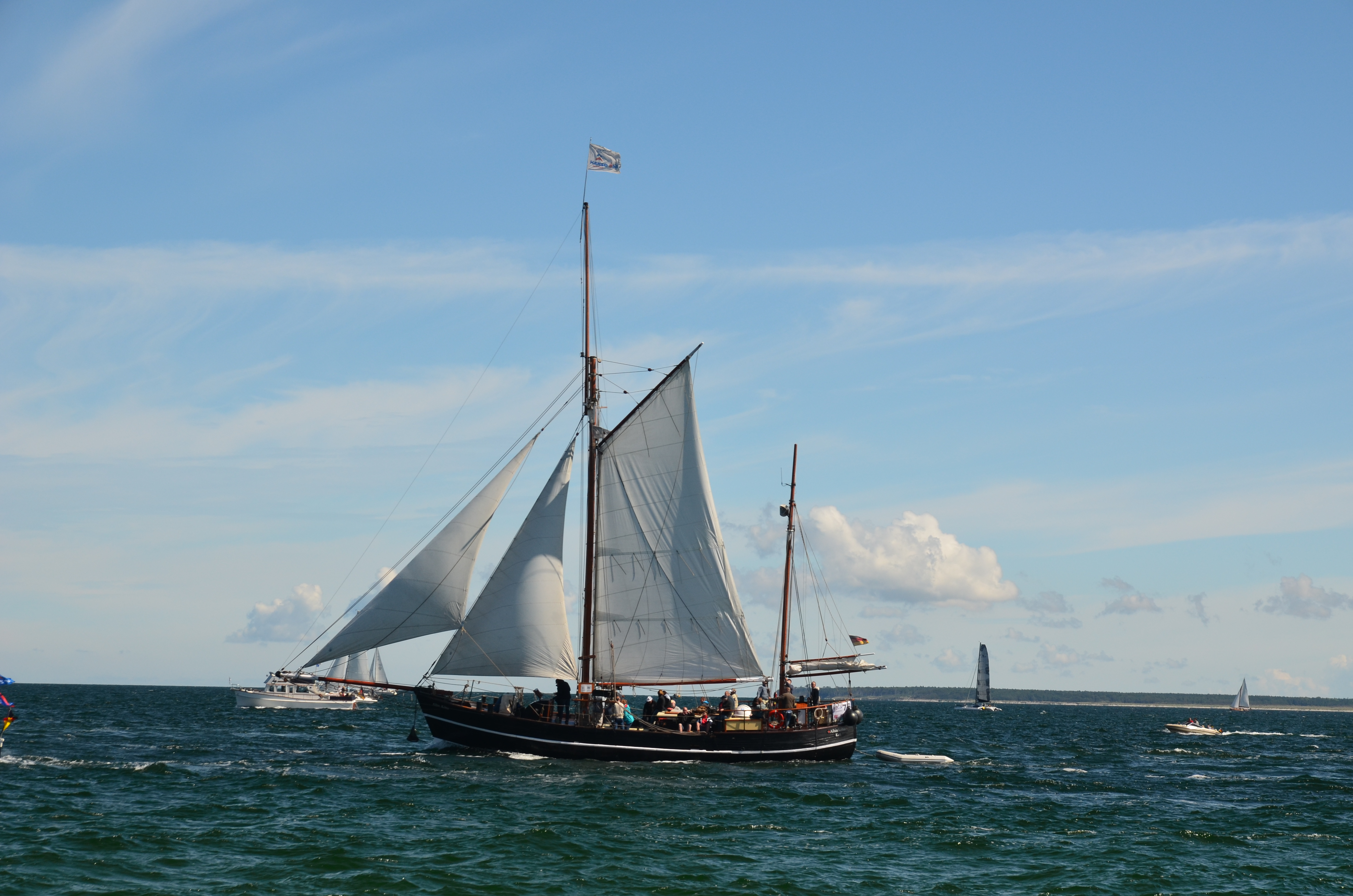
Gaff-ketch Albin Köbis

A television play about the case, Marinemeuterei 1917, was shown on West German television in 1969, directed by Hermann Kugelstadt and starring Dieter Wilken as Köbis and Karl-Heinz von Hassel as Reichpietsch.

== See also ==
- Kiel mutiny
