= SMS Rheinland =

Nassau-class battleship of the German Imperial Navy

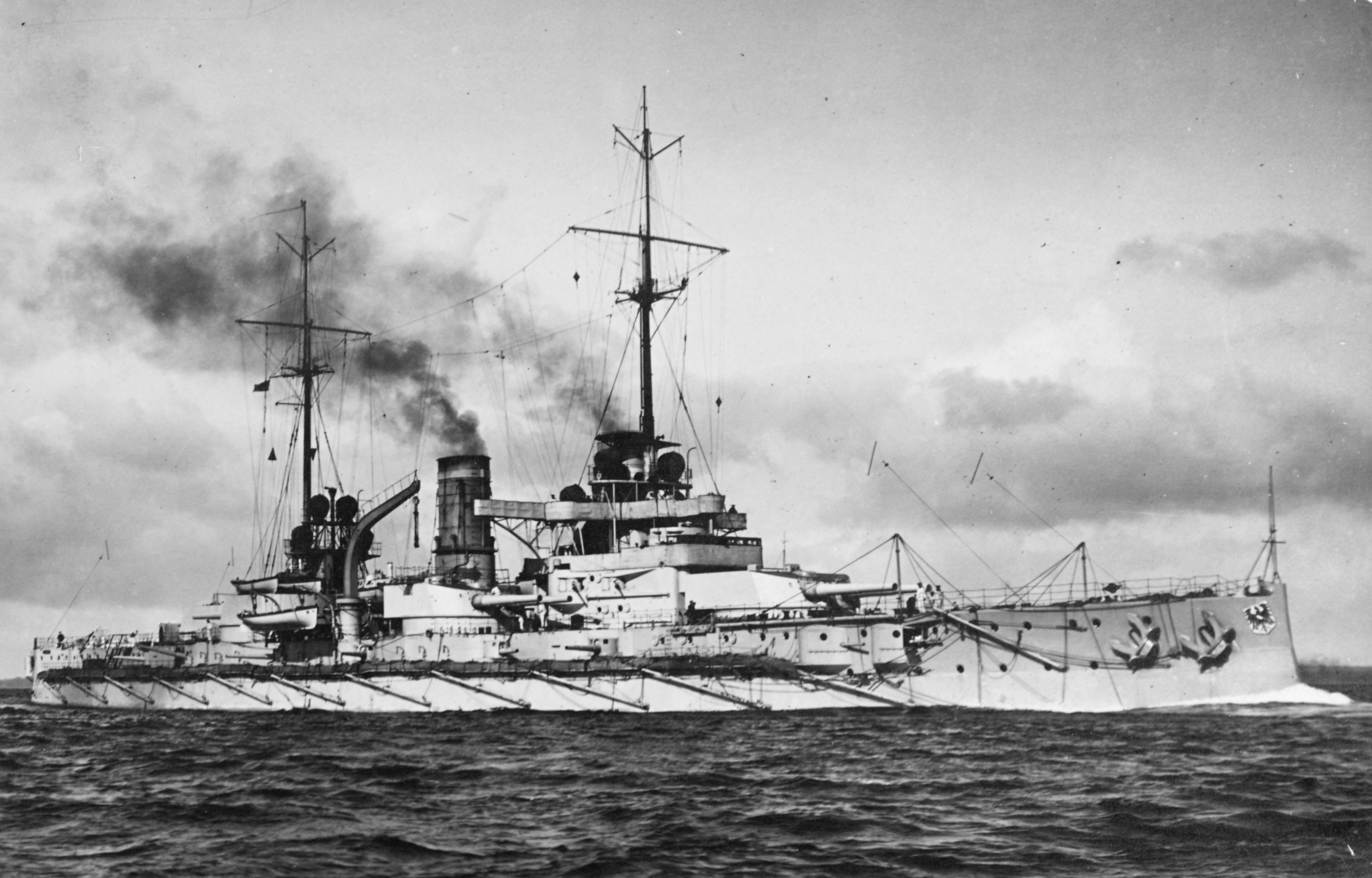
- Rheinland shortly after entering service in 1910

History

German Empire
- Namesake: Rhineland
- Builder: Vulcan AG, Stettin
- Laid down: 1 June 1907
- Launched: 26 September 1908
- Commissioned: 30 April 1910
- Decommissioned: 4 October 1918
- Stricken: 5 November 1919
- Fate: Ceded to the Allies, later scrapped in 1921

General characteristics
- Class & type: Nassau-class battleship
- Displacement: Normal: 18,873 t (18,575 long tons); Full load: 21,000 t (21,000 long tons)
- Length: 146.1 m (479 ft 4 in)
- Beam: 26.9 m (88 ft 3 in)
- Draft: 8.9 m (29 ft 2 in)
- Installed power: 12 × water-tube boilers; 21,699 ihp (16,181 kW)
- Propulsion: 3 × triple-expansion steam engines; 3 × screw propellers
- Speed: Designed: 19 kn (35 km/h; 22 mph); Maximum: 20 kn (37 km/h; 23 mph)
- Range: At 12 kn (22 km/h; 14 mph): 8,300 nmi (15,400 km; 9,600 mi)
- Complement: 40 officers; 968 men
- Armament: 12 × 28 cm (11 in) SK L/45 guns; 12 × 15 cm (5.9 in) SK L/45 guns; 16 × 8.8 cm (3.5 in) SK L/45 guns; 6 × 45 cm (17.7 in) torpedo tubes
- Armor: Belt: 300 mm (11.8 in); Turrets: 280 mm (11 in); Battery: 160 mm (6.3 in); Conning Tower: 400 mm; Torpedo bulkhead: 30 mm (1.2 in)

SMS Rheinland (Note: "SMS" stands for "Seiner Majestät Schiff", or "His Majesty's Ship".) was one of four Nassau-class battleships, the first dreadnoughts built for the German Imperial Navy (Kaiserliche Marine). Rheinland mounted twelve 28 cm (11 in) main guns in six twin turrets in an unusual hexagonal arrangement. The navy built Rheinland and her sister ships in response to the revolutionary British HMS Dreadnought, which had been launched in 1906. Rheinland was laid down in June 1907, launched the following year in October, and commissioned in April 1910.

Rheinland's extensive service with the High Seas Fleet during World War I included several fleet advances into the North Sea, some in support of raids against the English coast conducted by the German battlecruisers of I Scouting Group. These sorties culminated in the Battle of Jutland on 31 May – 1 June 1916, in which Rheinland was heavily engaged by British destroyers in close-range night fighting.

The ship also saw duty in the Baltic Sea, as part of the support force for the Battle of the Gulf of Riga in 1915. She returned to the Baltic as the core of an expeditionary force to aid the White Finns in the Finnish Civil War in 1918, but ran aground shortly after arriving in the area. Significant portions of her armor and all her main guns had to be removed before she could be refloated. The damage done by the grounding was deemed too severe to justify repairs and Rheinland was decommissioned to be used as a barracks ship for the remainder of the war. In 1919, following the scuttling of the German fleet at Scapa Flow, Rheinland was ceded to the Allies who, in turn, sold the vessel to ship-breakers in the Netherlands. The ship was broken up for scrap metal starting in 1920. Her bell is on display at the Bundeswehr Military History Museum in Dresden.

== Design ==
Design work on the Nassau class began in late 1903 in the context of the Anglo-German naval arms race; at the time, battleships of foreign navies had begun to carry increasingly heavy secondary batteries, including Italian and American ships with 20.3 cm (8 in) guns and British ships with 23.4 cm (9.2 in) guns, outclassing the previous German battleships of the Deutschland class with their 17 cm (6.7 in) secondaries. German designers initially considered ships equipped with 21 cm (8.3 in) secondary guns, but erroneous reports in early 1904 that the British Lord Nelson-class battleships would be equipped with a secondary battery of as many as ten 25.4 cm (10 in) guns prompted them to consider an even more powerful ship armed with an all-big-gun armament consisting of eight 28 cm (11 in) guns. This initial version was approved in March 1905, but further developments were incorporated over the course of the year, in part due to lessons learned during the on-going Russo-Japanese War. By January 1906, the design was refined into a larger vessel with twelve of the guns, by which time Britain had begun work on the all-big-gun battleship HMS Dreadnought.

=== Characteristics ===
Plan and profile drawing of the Nassau class

The ship was 146.1 m (479 ft 4 in) long, 26.9 m (88 ft 3 in) wide, and had a draft of 8.9 m (29 ft 2 in). She displaced 18,873 metric tons (18,575 long tons) with a normal load, and 20,535 t (20,211 long tons) fully laden. She had a flush deck and a ram bow, a common feature for warships of the period. Rheinland had a fairly small superstructure, consisting primarily of forward and aft conning towers. She was fitted with a pair of pole masts for signaling and observation purposes. The ship had a crew of 40 officers and 968 enlisted men.

She retained 3-shaft triple expansion engines instead of more advanced turbine engines. Steam for the engines was provided by twelve coal-fired water-tube boilers, which were vented through two funnels. Her propulsion system was rated at 22,000 metric horsepower (22,000 ihp; 16,000 kW) and provided a top speed of 20 knots (37 km/h; 23 mph). She had a cruising radius of 8,300 nautical miles (15,400 km; 9,600 mi) at a speed of 12 knots (22 km/h; 14 mph). (Note: This type of machinery was chosen at the request of both Admiral Alfred von Tirpitz and the Navy's construction department; the latter stated in 1905 that the "use of turbines in heavy warships does not recommend itself." This decision was based solely on cost: at the time, Parsons held a monopoly on steam turbines and required a 1 million gold mark royalty fee for every turbine engine made. German firms were not ready to begin production of turbines on a large scale until 1910.)

Rheinland carried a main battery of twelve 28 cm (11 in) SK L/45 (Note: In Imperial German Navy gun nomenclature, "SK" (Schnelladekanone) denotes that the gun is quick firing, while "L/45" provides the length of the gun in terms of the diameter of the barrel. In this case, the L/45 gun is 45 caliber, which means that the gun is 45 times as long as its diameter.) guns in six gun turrets arranged in an unusual hexagonal configuration. One was placed forward, another toward the stern, and the remaining four were placed on the wings, two per broadside. Her secondary armament consisted of twelve 15 cm (5.9 in) SK L/45 guns, mounted in casemates located amidships. Close-range defense against torpedo boats was provided by a tertiary battery of sixteen 8.8 cm (3.5 in) SK L/45 guns, which were also mounted in casemates. The ship was also armed with six 45 cm (17.7 in) submerged torpedo tubes. One tube was mounted in the bow, another in the stern, and two on each broadside, on both ends of the torpedo bulkheads.

The ship's hull was protected by heavy armor plate consisting of Krupp cemented steel. The belt armor along the sides of the hull was 29 cm (11.5 in) thick in the central portion, tapering down to 10 cm (4 in) at the bow. The belt was reinforced by an armored deck that angled downward at the sides to connect to the bottom edge of the belt. The deck was 3.8 cm (1.5 in) on the flat portion, while the sloped sides increased in thickness to 5.8 cm (2.3 in). Rheinland's main battery turrets had 28 cm of Krupp steel on their faces. Her forward conning tower had 30 cm (11.8 in) of armor plate on the sides, while the aft tower received only 20 cm (7.9 in) on the sides.

== Service history ==
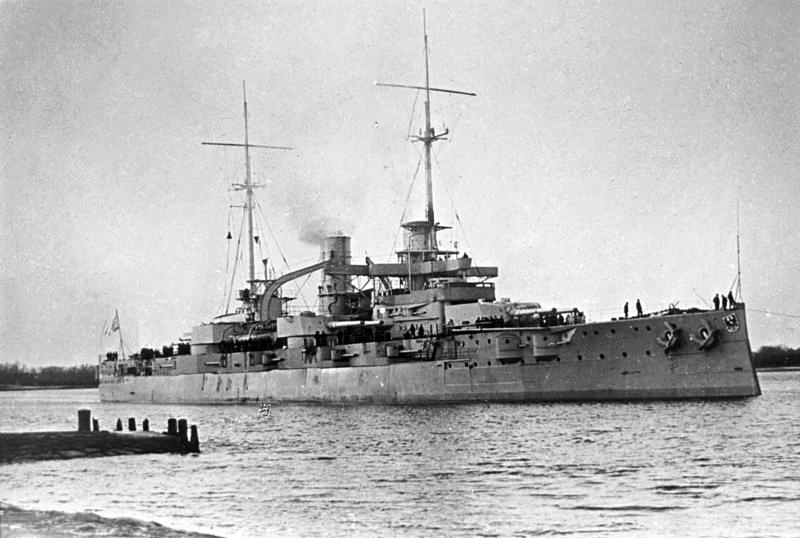
SMS Rheinland, c. 1910

Rheinland was ordered under the provisional name Ersatz Württemberg, as a replacement for the old Sachsen-class ironclad Württemberg. (Note: German warships were ordered under provisional names. Additions to the fleet were given a single letter; ships intended to replace older or lost vessels were ordered as "Ersatz (name of the ship to be replaced)".) She was laid down on 1 June 1907 at the AG Vulcan shipyard in Stettin. As with her sister Nassau, construction proceeded under absolute secrecy; detachments of soldiers guarded the shipyard itself, as well as contractors such as Krupp that supplied building materials. The ship was launched on 26 September 1908; at the launching ceremony the ship was christened by Queen Elisabeth of Romania and Clemens Freiherr von Schorlemer-Lieser gave a speech. Fitting-out work was completed by the end of February 1910. A dockyard crew was used for limited sea trials, which lasted from 23 February to 4 March 1910 off Swinemünde. She was then taken to Kiel, where she was commissioned into the High Seas Fleet on 30 April 1910. Under the command of Kapitän zur See (KzS) Albert Hopman, Rheinland conducted official sea trials in the Baltic Sea.

At the conclusion of trials on 30 August 1910, Rheinland was taken to Wilhelmshaven, where a significant portion of the crew was transferred to the new battlecruiser Von der Tann. For the next month, Hopman was temporarily replaced, though he returned in September. Following the autumn fleet maneuvers in September, the crew was replenished with crewmembers from the old pre-dreadnought battleship Zähringen, which was decommissioned at the same time. Rheinland was then assigned to I Battle Squadron of the High Seas Fleet. In October, the fleet went on the annual winter cruise, followed by fleet exercises in November. In March 1911, the fleet conducted exercises in the Skagerrak and Kattegat. Rheinland and the rest of the fleet received British and American naval squadrons at Kiel in June and July. The year's autumn maneuvers were confined to the Baltic and the Kattegat. Another fleet review was held afterward, during the exercises for a visiting Austro-Hungarian delegation that included Archduke Franz Ferdinand and Admiral Rudolf Montecuccoli. In September, KzS Richard Engel replaced Hopman.

The next year followed a similar pattern until mid-1912, when the summer cruise was confined to the Baltic due to the Agadir Crisis; the naval command sought to avoid exposing the fleet during the period of heightened tension with Britain and France. The September exercises were conducted off Helgoland in the North Sea. The training schedule returned to normal for 1913 and 1914, and the summer cruises again went to Norway. For the 1914 cruise, the fleet departed for Norwegian waters on 14 July, some two weeks after the assassination of Archduke Franz Ferdinand in Sarajevo. The probability of war cut the cruise short; Rheinland and the rest of the fleet were back in Wilhelmshaven by 29 July.

=== World War I ===
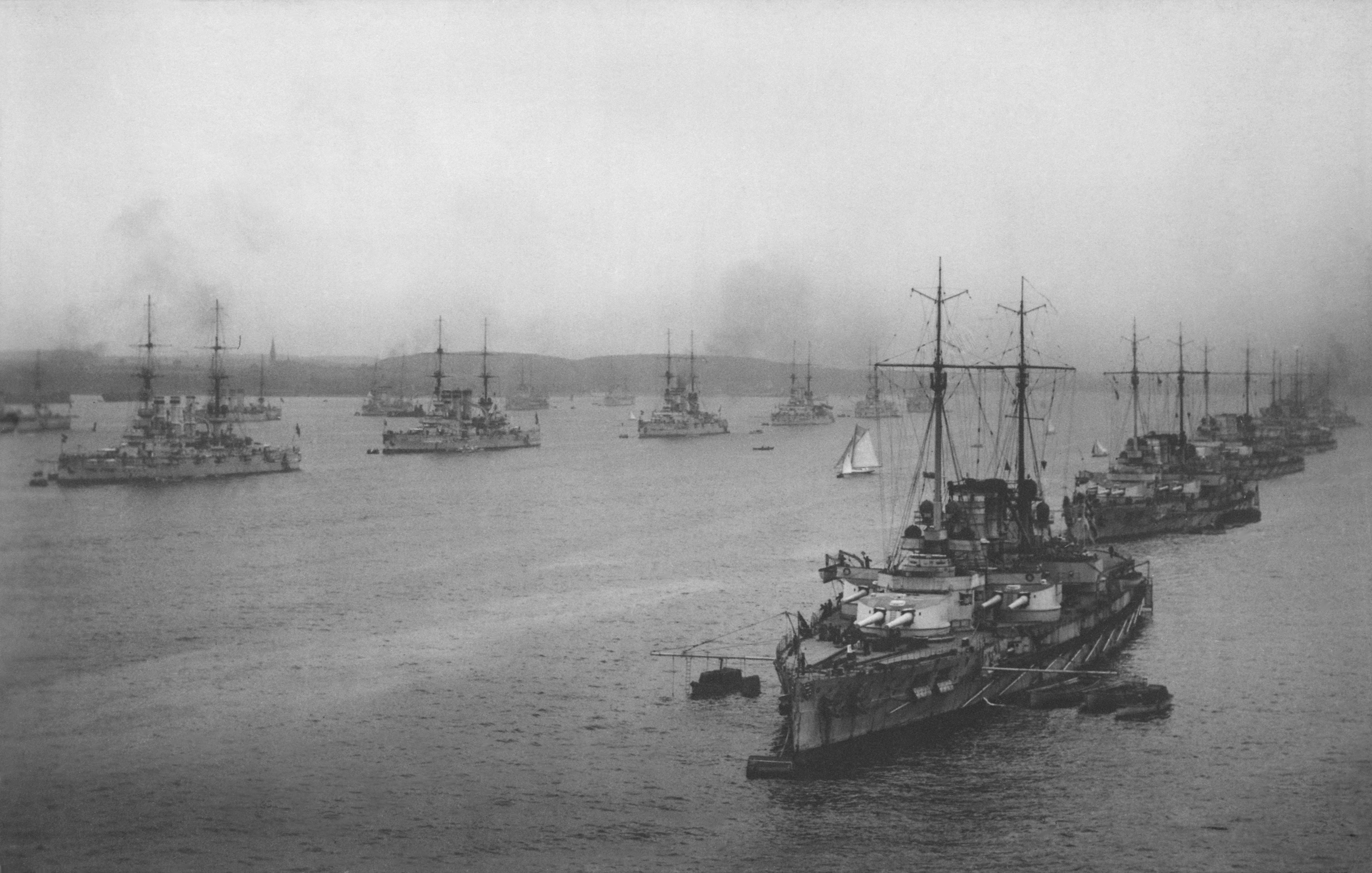
Rheinland and the rest of I Battle Squadron in Kiel before the war

Rheinland participated in nearly all of the fleet advances throughout the war. The first such operation was conducted primarily by the battlecruisers; the ships bombarded Scarborough, Hartlepool, and Whitby on 15–16 December 1914. During the operation, the German battle fleet of some 12 dreadnoughts and 8 pre-dreadnoughts, which was serving as distant support for the battlecruisers, came to within 10 nmi (19 km; 12 mi) of an isolated squadron of six British battleships. However, skirmishes between the rival destroyer screens convinced the German commander, Admiral Friedrich von Ingenohl, that he was confronted with the entire Grand Fleet. He broke off the engagement and turned for home.

Rheinland next took part in the fleet advance on 24 January 1915 to support I Scouting Group after it had been ambushed by the British 1st and 2nd Battlecruiser Squadrons during the Battle of Dogger Bank, though she again saw no action, as the battle had ended before the High Seas Fleet arrived late in the afternoon. Following the loss of the armored cruiser SMS Blücher at the Battle of Dogger Bank, the Kaiser removed Ingenohl from his post on 2 February. Admiral Hugo von Pohl replaced him as commander of the fleet. Pohl conducted a series of fleet advances in 1915 in which Rheinland took part; in the first one on 29–30 March, the fleet steamed out to the north of Terschelling and return without incident. Another followed on 17–18 April, where the fleet covered a mining operation by II Scouting Group. Three days later, on 21–22 April, the High Seas Fleet advanced towards the Dogger Bank, though again failed to meet any British forces. During the operation, the high-pressure cylinder of Rheinland's starboard engine failed. Repair work lasted until 23 May. The fleet next went to sea on 29–30 May, advancing as far as Schiermonnikoog before being forced to turn back by inclement weather. On 10 August, the fleet steamed to the north of Helgoland to cover the return of the auxiliary cruiser Meteor. That month, Heinrich Rohardt was given command of Rheinland.

==== Battle of the Gulf of Riga ====
In August 1915, the German fleet attempted to clear the Russian-held Gulf of Riga in order to facilitate the capture of Riga by the German army. To do so, the German planners intended to drive off or destroy the Russian naval forces in the Gulf, which included the pre-dreadnought battleship Slava and a number of gunboats and destroyers. The German naval force would also lay a series of minefields in the northern entrance to the Gulf to prevent Russian naval reinforcements from reentering the area. The assembled German fleet included Rheinland and her three sister ships, the four Helgoland-class battleships, and the battlecruisers Von der Tann, Moltke, and Seydlitz. The force operated under the command of Vice Admiral Franz von Hipper. The eight battleships were to provide cover for the forces engaging the Russian flotilla. The first attempt on 8 August was unsuccessful, as it had taken too long to clear the Russian minefields to allow the minelayer Deutschland to lay a minefield of her own.

On 16 August 1915, a second attempt was made to enter the Gulf: Nassau and Posen, four light cruisers, and 31 torpedo boats managed to breach the Russian defenses. On the first day of the assault, the German minesweeper T46 was sunk, as was the destroyer V99. The following day, Nassau and Posen engaged in an artillery duel with Slava, resulting in three hits on the Russian ship that forced her to retreat. By 19 August, the Russian minefields had been cleared and the flotilla entered the Gulf. However, reports of Allied submarines in the area prompted the Germans to call off the operation the following day. Admiral Hipper later remarked that "To keep valuable ships for a considerable time in a limited area in which enemy submarines were increasingly active, with the corresponding risk of damage and loss, was to indulge in a gamble out of all proportion to the advantage to be derived from the occupation of the Gulf before the capture of Riga from the land side."

==== Return to the North Sea ====
Rheinland in port, date unknown

By the end of August, Rheinland and the rest of the High Seas Fleet units were back in their bases on the North Sea. The next operation conducted was a sweep into the North Sea on 11–12 September, though it ended without any action. Another sortie followed on 23–24 October during which the German fleet did not encounter any British forces. On 12 January 1916, Admiral Reinhard Scheer replaced Pohl as the fleet commander; Scheer continued the aggressive fleet strategy of his predecessors. On 12 February 1916, Rheinland was sent to the dockyard for an extensive overhaul, which lasted until 19 April. Rheinland was back with the fleet in time to participate in another advance into the North Sea on 21–22 April. Another bombardment mission followed two days later; Rheinland was part of the battleship support for the I Scouting Group battlecruisers that attacked Yarmouth and Lowestoft on 24–25 April. During this operation, the battlecruiser Seydlitz was damaged by a British mine and had to return to port prematurely. Visibility was poor, so the operation was quickly called off before the British fleet could intervene.

==== Battle of Jutland ====
Scheer immediately planned another attack on the British coast, but the damage to Seydlitz and condenser trouble on several of the III Battle Squadron dreadnoughts delayed the plan until the end of May. The German battlefleet departed the Jade at 03:30 on 31 May. (Note: The times mentioned in this section are in CET, which is congruent with the German perspective. This is one hour ahead of GMT, the time zone commonly used in British works.) Rheinland was assigned to II Division of I Battle Squadron, under the command of Rear Admiral W. Engelhardt. Rheinland was the second ship in the division, astern of Posen and ahead of Nassau and Westfalen. II Division was the last unit of dreadnoughts in the fleet; they were followed by the elderly pre-dreadnoughts of II Battle Squadron.

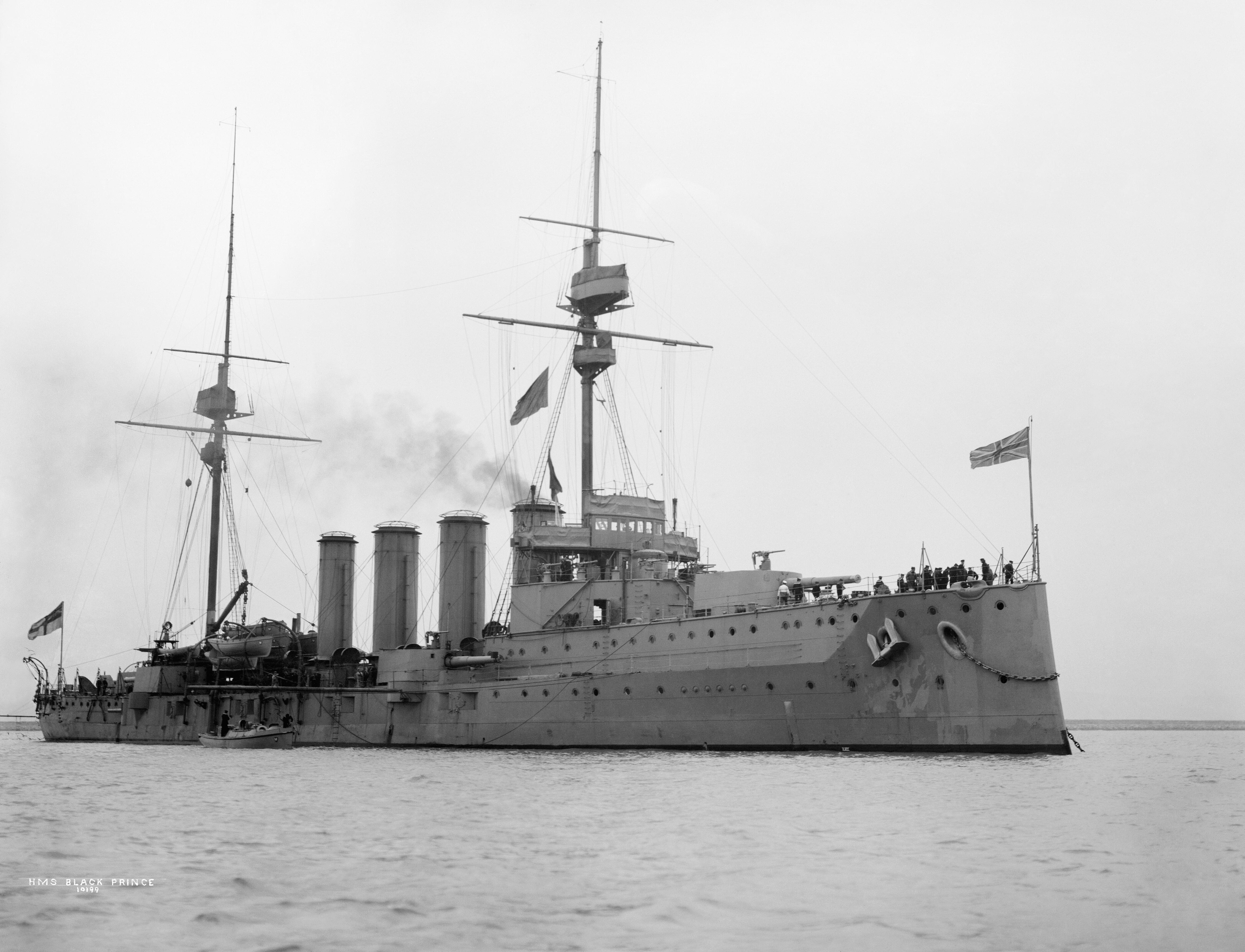
HMS Black Prince

Between 17:48 and 17:52, 11 German dreadnoughts, including Rheinland, engaged and opened fire on the British 2nd Light Cruiser Squadron, though the range and poor visibility prevented effective fire, which was soon checked. Some ten minutes later Rheinland again opened fire on the British cruisers, targeting what was most likely HMS Southampton, though without success. By 20:15, the German fleet had faced the deployed Grand Fleet for a second time and was forced to turn away; in doing so, the order of the German line was reversed, with Rheinland third from the front, behind Westfalen and Nassau. At 21:22, crewmen aboard Rheinland and Westfalen, the two leading ships in the German line, spotted two torpedo tracks that turned out to be imaginary. The ships were then forced to slow down in order to allow the battlecruisers of I Scouting Group to pass ahead. Around 22:00, Rheinland and Westfalen observed unidentified light forces in the gathering darkness. After flashing a challenge via searchlight that was ignored, the two ships turned away to starboard in order to evade any torpedoes that might have been fired. The rest of I Battle Squadron followed them.

At about 00:30, the leading units of the German line encountered British destroyers and cruisers. A violent firefight at close range ensued; Rheinland engaged the armored cruiser HMS Black Prince with her secondary guns at a range of 2,200 to 2,600 m (2,400 to 2,800 yd). After a few minutes, Rheinland and the rest of the German battleships turned away to avoid torpedoes. At 00:36, Rheinland was hit by a pair of 6 in (15 cm) shells from Black Prince. One of the shells cut the cables to the four forward searchlights and damaged the forward funnel. The second struck the side of the ship and exploded on the forward armored transverse bulkhead. Although the bulkhead was bent inward from the explosion, it was not penetrated. About 45 minutes later, Rheinland opened fire on another destroyer, possibly Ardent, but she had to cease when a German cruiser came too close to the line of fire. At the same time, Black Prince was obliterated by accurate fire from the battleship Ostfriesland.

Despite the ferocity of the night fighting, the High Seas Fleet punched through the British destroyer forces and reached Horns Reef by 04:00 on 1 June. The German fleet reached Wilhelmshaven a few hours later, where Rheinland refueled and re-armed. Meanwhile, her three sisters stood out in the roadstead in defensive positions. Over the course of the battle, the ship had fired thirty-five 28 cm (11 in) shells and twenty-six 15 cm (5.9 in) rounds. The two hits from Black Prince had killed 10 men and wounded 20. Repair work followed immediately in Wilhelmshaven and was completed by 10 June.

==== Later actions ====
Another fleet advance followed on 18–22 August; the I Scouting Group battlecruisers were to bombard the coastal town of Sunderland in an attempt to draw out and destroy Beatty's battlecruisers. As only two of the four German battlecruisers were still in fighting condition, three dreadnoughts were assigned to the Scouting Group for the operation: Markgraf, Grosser Kurfürst, and the newly commissioned Bayern. Rheinland and the rest of the High Seas Fleet were to trail behind and provide cover. The British were aware of the German plans and sortied the Grand Fleet to meet them. By 14:35, Admiral Scheer had been warned of the Grand Fleet's approach and, unwilling to engage the whole of the Grand Fleet just 11 weeks after the decidedly close call at Jutland, turned his forces around and retreated to German ports.

Rheinland covered a sweep by torpedo boats into the North Sea on 25–26 September. The fleet advanced as far as the Dogger Bank on 19–20 October. The operation led to a brief action on 19 October, during which a British submarine torpedoed the cruiser München. The failure of the operation (coupled with the action of 19 August) convinced the German naval command to abandon its aggressive fleet strategy in favor of a resumption of the unrestricted submarine warfare campaign. In early 1917, the ship was stationed on sentry duty in the German Bight. The crew became unruly due to poor quality food in July and August of that year. The ship did not take part directly in Operation Albion against the Russians, but remained in the western Baltic to prevent a possible incursion by the British to support their Russian ally.

==== Expedition to Finland ====
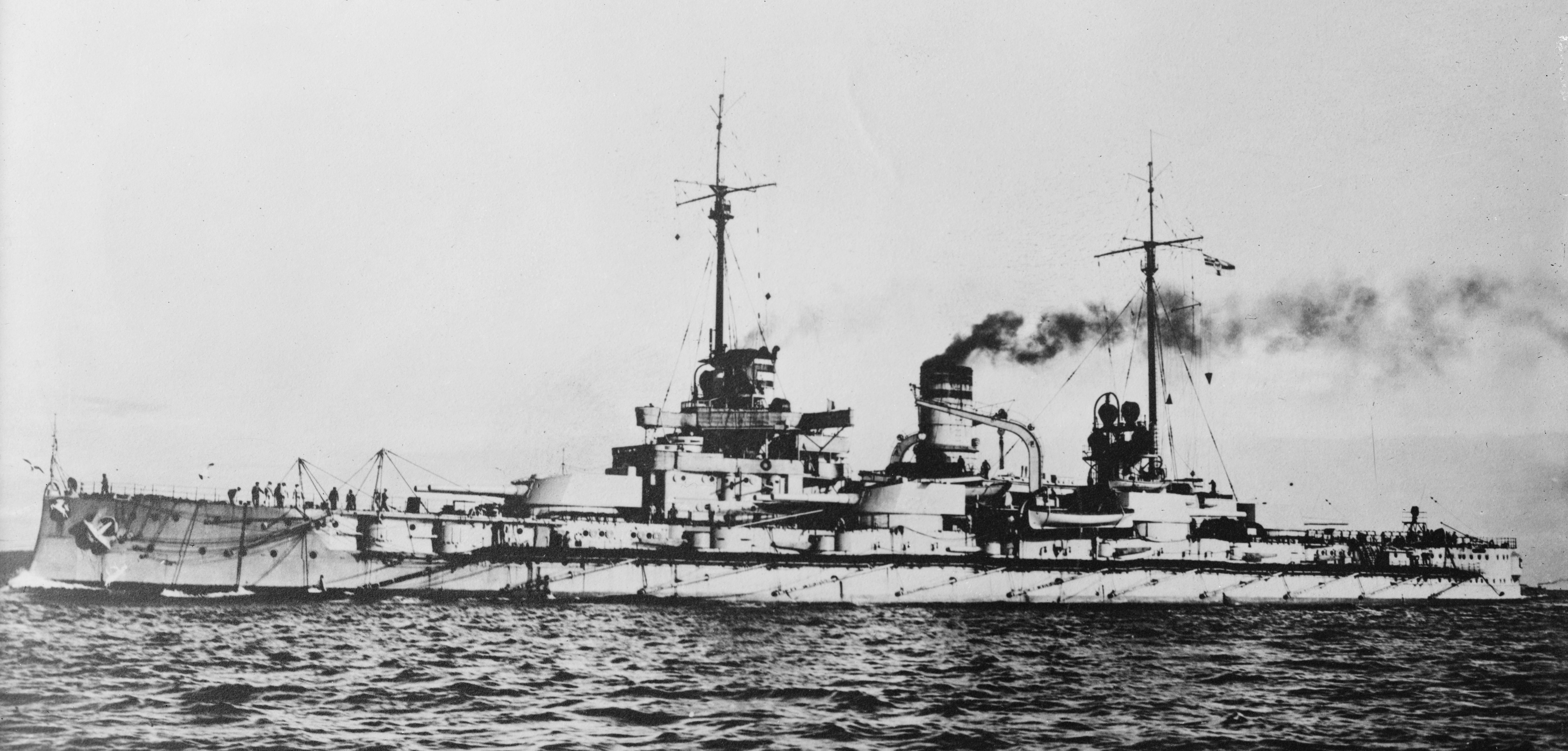
SMS Westfalen

In late 1917, the Grand Duchy of Finland declared independence from the collapsing Russian Empire, but the country quickly devolved into a civil war between the Whites and the Reds. As the latter were being supported by the new Communist government of Soviet Russia, which was still fighting Germany, the German government decided to intervene in Finland to aid the White faction. Rheinland was assigned to a squadron that was to support a German expeditionary force deployed to Finland. The naval unit, commanded by Konteradmiral Hugo Meurer, was assigned three tasks: to seize the island of Åland for use as a forward operating base; transfer the army's Baltic Sea Division to Finland; and to support army operations along the Finnish coast. The squadron, which was named a Sonderverband (special unit), also included Westfalen, the minelaying cruiser Nautilus, III Sperrbrecher Group, the 9th Minesweeping Half-Flotilla, four torpedo boats, and a number of supporting vessels and transports.

On 23 February, the two battleships took on the 14th Jäger Battalion and a company of bicycle troops, and early on 24 February they departed for Åland. Sweden had previously granted permission for Germany to sail through Swedish territorial waters, but by this time, had revoked the agreement, so the ship had to sail through international waters. Meuer initially intended to land the soldiers near Lemland, but the danger of mines and heavy sea ice forced him to move to Eckerö, despite Swedish objections. Sweden had already sent forces to the island, including a squadron that consisted of coastal defense ships Sverige, Thor, and Oscar II, and they were already in Eckerö when the Germans arrived. Negotiations ensued, which resulted in the landing of the German troops on Åland on 7 March; Westfalen then returned to Danzig, but Rheinland was left at Eckerö. She remained there until 10 April.

On 11 April, the ship departed the Ålands for Helsinki, with the intention of proceeding to Danzig to refuel. However, she encountered heavy fog while en route and ran aground on Lagskär Island at 07:30. Two men were killed in the incident and the ship was badly damaged. Three boiler rooms were flooded and the inner hull was pierced. Refloating efforts on 18–20 April proved unsuccessful. The crew was removed temporarily, to bring the pre-dreadnought Schlesien back into service. On 8 May, the floating crane Viper was brought in from Danzig; the main guns, some of the turret armor, and the bow and citadel armor were all removed. The ship was lightened by 6,400 t (6,300 long tons; 7,100 short tons)—more than a third of her normal displacement—and with the aid of pontoons, eventually refloated by 9 July. The ship was towed to Mariehamn where some limited repairs were effected. On 24 July the ship departed for Kiel with the assistance of two tug boats; she arrived there three days later. It was determined that repair work was impractical and instead the ship was decommissioned on 4 October and placed into service as a barracks ship in Kiel.

=== Fate ===
Following the German collapse in November 1918, a significant portion of the High Seas Fleet was interned in Scapa Flow according to the terms of the Armistice. Rheinland and her three sisters were not among the ships listed for internment, so they remained in German ports. They had their guns disabled, along with the four Helgoland-class battleships. Under the terms of the Treaty of Versailles that formally ended the war in June 1919, Rheinland and the other dreadnoughts that had remained in Germany were to be surrendered to the Allies under Article 185. Negotiations between the Allies over which country received what vessels, and what those ships could be used for began in November. Rheinland was struck from the German naval list on 5 November in preparation for the transfer. While final decisions were still being made, the Allies decided that the ships in question were to sail to either a British or French port, and accordingly, though Rheinland was not transferred because she was too unseaworthy after her grounding. Instead, she was sold directly to a Dutch shipbreaker on 28 June 1920; she was towed to Dordrecht on 29 August under the contract name "F". Rheinland's bell is preserved at the Bundeswehr Military History Museum in Dresden.
