= SMS Nassau =

Battleship of the German Imperial Navy; lead ship of her class

- Nassau, very early in her career

History

Germany
- Name: Nassau
- Namesake: Duchy of Nassau part of the Prussian province of Hesse Nassau
- Builder: Kaiserliche Werft, Wilhelmshaven
- Laid down: 22 July 1907
- Launched: 7 March 1908
- Commissioned: 1 October 1909
- Fate: Ceded to Japan as war prize, sold for scrap in 1920

General characteristics
- Class & type: Nassau-class battleship
- Displacement: Normal: 18,873 t (18,575 long tons); Full load: 21,000 t (21,000 long tons)
- Length: 146.1 m (479 ft 4 in)
- Beam: 26.9 m (88 ft 3 in)
- Draft: 8.9 m (29 ft 2 in)
- Installed power: 12 × water-tube boilers; 21,699 ihp (16,181 kW)
- Propulsion: 3 × triple-expansion steam engines; 3 × screw propellers
- Speed: 20 knots (37 km/h; 23 mph)
- Range: At 12 knots (22 km/h; 14 mph): 8,300 nmi (15,400 km; 9,600 mi)
- Complement: 40 officers; 968 men
- Armament: 12 × 28 cm (11 in) guns; 12 × 15 cm (6 in) guns; 16 × 8.8 cm (3 in) guns; 6 × 45 cm (17.7 in) torpedo tubes
- Armor: Belt: 270 mm (10.6 in); Turrets: 280 mm (11 in); Deck: 80 mm (3.1 in); Conning Tower: 400 mm (15.7 in)

SMS Nassau (Note: "SMS" stands for "Seiner Majestät Schiff", or "His Majesty's Ship" in German.) was the first dreadnought battleship built for the Imperial German Navy. Nassau was laid down on 22 July 1907 at the Kaiserliche Werft in Wilhelmshaven, and launched less than a year later on 7 March 1908, approximately 25 months after Dreadnought. She was the lead ship of her class of four battleships, which included Posen, Rheinland, and Westfalen.

Nassau saw service in the North Sea at the beginning of World War I, in II Division of I Battle Squadron of the German High Seas Fleet. In August 1915, she entered the Baltic Sea and participated in the Battle of the Gulf of Riga, where she engaged the Russian battleship Slava. Following her return to the North Sea, Nassau and her sister ships took part in the Battle of Jutland on 31 May – 1 June 1916. During the battle, Nassau collided with the British destroyer HMS Spitfire. Nassau suffered a total of 11 killed and 16 injured during the engagement.

After World War I, the bulk of the High Seas Fleet was interned in Scapa Flow. As they were the oldest German dreadnoughts, the Nassau-class ships were for the time permitted to remain in German ports. After the German fleet was scuttled, Nassau and her three sisters were surrendered to the victorious Allied powers as replacements for the sunken ships. Nassau was ceded to Japan in April 1920. With no use for the ship, Japan sold her to a British wrecking firm, which then scrapped her in Dordrecht, Netherlands.

== Design ==
Design work on the Nassau class began in late 1903 in the context of the Anglo-German naval arms race; at the time, battleships of foreign navies had begun to carry increasingly heavy secondary batteries, including Italian and American ships with 20.3 cm (8 in) guns and British ships with 23.4 cm (9.2 in) guns, outclassing the previous German battleships of the Deutschland class with their 17 cm (6.7 in) secondaries. German designers initially considered ships equipped with 21 cm (8.3 in) secondary guns, but erroneous reports in early 1904 that the British Lord Nelson-class battleships would be equipped with a secondary battery of as many as ten 25.4 cm (10 in) guns prompted them to consider an even more powerful ship armed with an all-big-gun armament consisting of eight 28 cm (11 in) guns. This initial version was approved in March 1905, but further developments were incorporated over the course of the year, in part due to lessons learned during the on-going Russo-Japanese War. By January 1906, the design was refined into a larger vessel with twelve of the guns, by which time Britain had begun work on the all-big-gun battleship HMS Dreadnought.

=== Characteristics ===
Plan and profile drawing of the Nassau class

Nassau was 146.1 m (479 ft 4 in) long, 26.9 m (88 ft 3 in) wide, and had a draft of 8.9 m (29 ft 2 in). She displaced 18,873 metric tons (18,575 long tons) with a normal load, and 20,535 t (20,211 long tons) fully laden. She had a flush deck and a ram bow, a common feature for warships of the period. Nassau had a fairly small superstructure, consisting primarily of forward and aft conning towers. She was fitted with a pair of pole masts for signaling and observation purposes. The ship had a crew of 40 officers and 968 enlisted men.

Nassau retained 3-shaft triple expansion engines instead of the more advanced turbine engines. Steam was provided to the engines by twelve coal-fired water-tube boilers, which were vented through two funnels. Her propulsion system was rated at 22,000 metric horsepower (22,000 ihp; 16,000 kW) and provided a top speed of 20 knots (37 km/h; 23 mph). She had a cruising radius of 8,300 nautical miles (15,400 km; 9,600 mi) at a speed of 12 knots (22 km/h; 14 mph). (Note: This type of machinery was chosen at the request of both Admiral Alfred von Tirpitz and the Navy's construction department; the latter stated in 1905 that the "use of turbines in heavy warships does not recommend itself." This decision was based solely on cost: at the time, Parsons held a monopoly on steam turbines and required a 1 million gold mark royalty fee for every turbine engine made. German firms were not ready to begin production of turbines on a large scale until 1910.)

Nassau carried a main battery of twelve 28 cm (11 in) SK L/45 (Note: In Imperial German Navy gun nomenclature, "SK" (Schnelladekanone) denotes that the gun quick firing, while "L/45" provides the length of the gun regarding the diameter of the barrel. In this case, the L/45 gun is 45 caliber, which means that the gun is 45 times as long as its diameter.) guns in six gun turrets arranged in an unusual hexagonal configuration. One was placed forward, another toward the stern, and the remaining four were placed on the wings, two per broadside. Her secondary armament consisted of twelve 15 cm (6 in) SK L/45 guns, mounted in casemates located amidships. Close-range defense against torpedo boats was provided by a tertiary battery of sixteen 8.8 cm (3 in) SK L/45 guns, which were also mounted in casemates. The ship was also armed with six 45 cm (17.7 in) submerged torpedo tubes. One tube was mounted in the bow, another in the stern, and two on each broadside, on either ends of the torpedo bulkhead.

The ship's hull was protected by heavy armor plate consisting of Krupp cemented steel. The belt armor along the sides of the hull was 29 cm (11.5 in) thick in the central portion, tapering down to 10 cm (4 in) at the bow. The belt was reinforced by an armored deck that angled downward at the sides to connect to the bottom edge of the belt. The deck was 3.8 cm (1.5 in) on the flat portion, while the sloped sides increased in thickness to 5.8 cm (2.3 in). Nassau's main battery turrets had 28 cm of Krupp steel on their faces. Her forward conning tower had 30 cm (11.8 in) of armor plate on the sides, while the aft tower received only 20 cm (7.9 in) on the sides.

== Service history ==
Nassau early in her career, c. 1909–1910

Nassau was ordered under the provisional name Ersatz Bayern, (Note: German warships were ordered under provisional names. Additions to the fleet were given a single letter; ships intended to replace older or lost vessels were ordered as "Ersatz (name of the ship to be replaced)".) as a replacement for the old Sachsen-class ironclad Bayern. She was laid down on 22 July 1907 at the Kaiserliche Werft in Wilhelmshaven, under construction number 30. Construction work proceeded under absolute secrecy; detachments of soldiers were tasked with guarding the shipyard itself, as well as contractors that supplied building materials, such as Krupp. The ship was launched on 7 March 1908; she was christened by Princess Hilda of Nassau, and the ceremony was attended by Kaiser Wilhelm II and Prince Henry of the Netherlands, representing his wife's House of Orange-Nassau.

Fitting-out work was delayed significantly when a dockyard worker accidentally removed a blanking plate from a large pipe, which allowed a significant amount of water to flood the ship. The ship did not have its watertight bulkheads installed, so the water spread throughout the ship and caused it to list to port and sink 1.6 m (5 ft 3 in) to the bottom of the dock. Nassau had also not had her bilge pumps installed yet, which delayed repairs. The ship had to be pumped dry and cleaned out, which proved to be a laborious task. The ship was completed by the end of September 1909. She was commissioned into the High Seas Fleet on 1 October 1909, and sea trials commenced immediately. Her first commander was Kapitän zur See (KzS—Captain at Sea) Christian Schütz.

On 16 October 1909, Nassau and her sister Westfalen participated in a ceremony for the opening of the new third entrance in the Wilhelmshaven Naval Dockyard. They took part in the annual maneuvers of the High Seas Fleet in February 1910 while still on trials. Nassau finished her testing and evaluation on 3 May and joined I Battle Squadron of the High Seas Fleet, replacing the old pre-dreadnought battleship Kaiser Karl der Grosse. Over the next four years, the ship participated in the regular series of squadron and fleet maneuvers and training cruises. Immediately after entering service in May, Nassau and the rest of the fleet conducted training maneuvers in the Kattegat. These were in accordance with Holtzendorff's strategy, which envisioned drawing the Royal Navy into the narrow waters there. The annual summer cruise was to Norway, and was followed by fleet training, during which another fleet review was held in Danzig on 29 August. In September, KzS Gisberth Jasper relieved Schütz as the ship's captain. A training cruise into the Baltic followed at the end of the year.

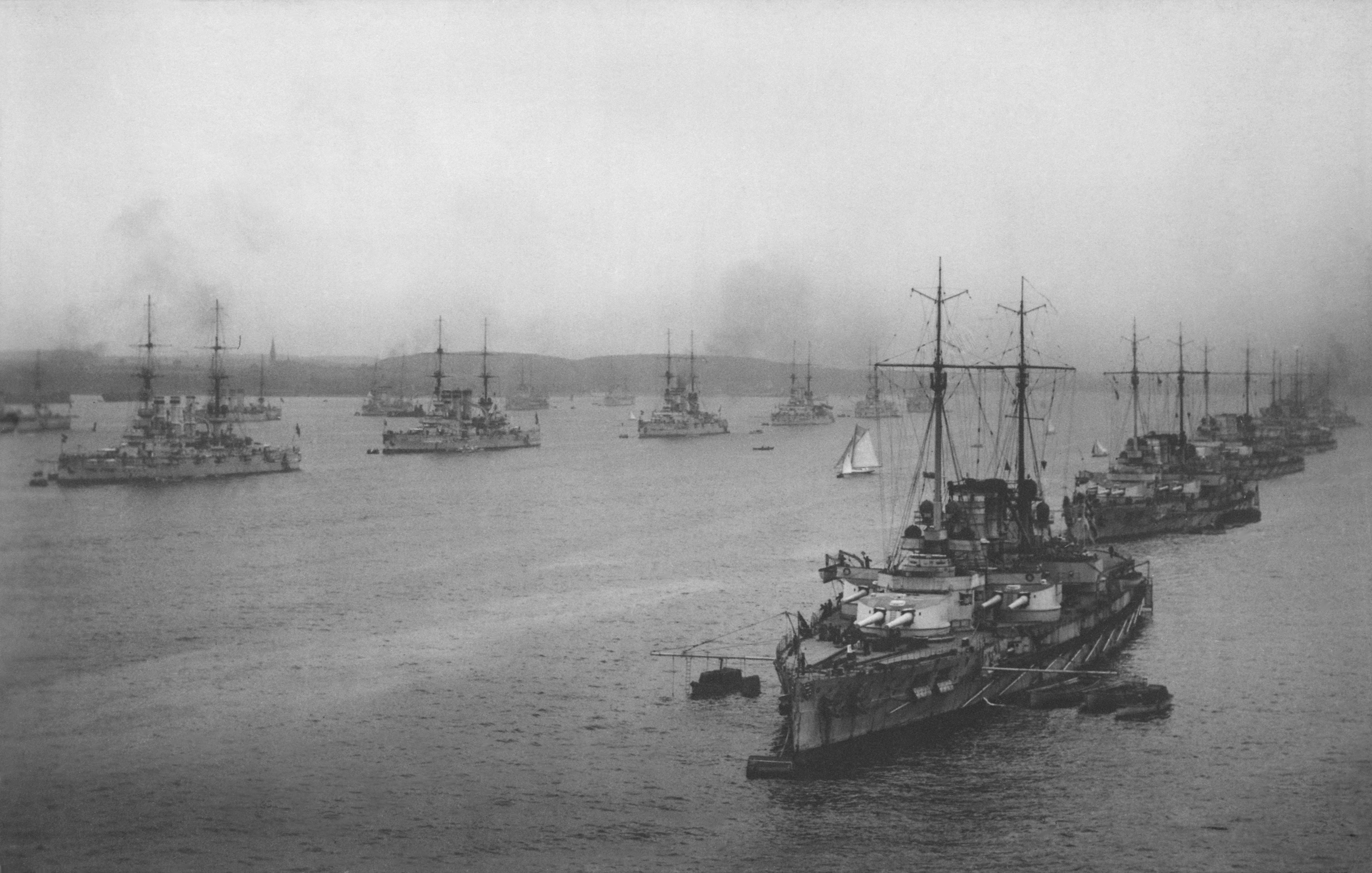
Nassau and the rest of I Battle Squadron in Kiel before the war

In March 1911, the fleet conducted exercises in the Skagerrak and Kattegat. Nassau and the rest of the fleet received British and American naval squadrons at Kiel in June and July. The year's autumn maneuvers were confined to the Baltic and the Kattegat. Another fleet review was held afterward, during the exercises for a visiting Austro-Hungarian delegation that included Archduke Franz Ferdinand and Admiral Rudolf Montecuccoli. Nassau won the Kaiser's Schießpreis (Shooting Prize) for excellent shooting in the 1911 training year. In mid-1912, due to the Agadir Crisis, the summer cruise was confined to the Baltic, to avoid exposing the fleet during the period of heightened tension with Britain and France. KzS Ludolf von Uslar took command of the ship in October. Nassau won the Schießpreis for a second time in 1912. A training cruise in the Baltic took place late in the year. The training program for 1913 proceeded in much the same pattern as in previous years.

On 14 July 1914, the annual summer cruise to Norway began. The threat of war caused Kaiser Wilhelm II to cancel the cruise after two weeks, and by the end of July the fleet was back in port. War between Austria-Hungary and Serbia broke out on the 28th, and in the span of a week all of the major European powers had joined the conflict.

=== World War I ===
Nassau participated in most of the fleet advances into the North Sea throughout the war. The first operation was conducted primarily by Rear Admiral Franz von Hipper's battlecruisers; the ships bombarded the English coastal towns of Scarborough, Hartlepool, and Whitby on 15–16 December 1914. A German battlefleet of 12 dreadnoughts—including Nassau—and eight pre-dreadnoughts sailed in support of the battlecruisers. On the evening of 15 December, they came to within 10 nmi (19 km; 12 mi) of an isolated squadron of six British battleships. Skirmishes in the darkness between the rival destroyer screens convinced the German fleet commander, Admiral Friedrich von Ingenohl, that the entire Grand Fleet was deployed before him. Under orders from the Kaiser to not risk the fleet, Ingenohl broke off the engagement and turned the battlefleet back towards Germany.

Nassau next took part in the fleet advance on 24 January 1915 to support I Scouting Group after it had been ambushed by the British 1st and 2nd Battlecruiser Squadrons during the Battle of Dogger Bank, though she again saw no action, as the battle had ended before the High Seas Fleet arrived late in the afternoon. Following the loss of the armored cruiser SMS Blücher at the Battle of Dogger Bank, the Kaiser removed Ingenohl from his post on 2 February. Admiral Hugo von Pohl replaced him as commander of the fleet. Pohl conducted a series of fleet advances in 1915 in which Nassau took part; in the first one on 29–30 March, the fleet steamed out to the north of Terschelling and return without incident. Another followed on 17–18 April, where the fleet covered a mining operation by II Scouting Group. Three days later, on 21–22 April, the High Seas Fleet advanced towards the Dogger Bank, though again failed to meet any British forces. The fleet next went to sea on 29–30 May, advancing as far as Schiermonnikoog before being forced to turn back by inclement weather. On 10 August, the fleet steamed to the north of Helgoland to cover the return of the auxiliary cruiser Meteor. That month, KzS Max Köthner replaced Uslar as Nassau's captain.

==== Battle of the Gulf of Riga ====
Nassau underway

In August 1915, the German fleet attempted to clear the Gulf of Riga to facilitate the capture of Riga by the German Army. To do so, the German planners intended to drive off or destroy the Russian naval forces in the area, which included the pre-dreadnought battleship Slava and a number of gunboats and destroyers. The German naval force would also lay a series of minefields in the northern entrance to the gulf to prevent Russian naval reinforcements from being able to enter the area. The fleet that assembled for the assault included Nassau and her three sister ships, the four Helgoland-class battleships, and the battlecruisers Von der Tann, Moltke, and Seydlitz. The force would operate under the command of now-Vice Admiral Hipper. The eight battleships were to provide cover for the forces engaging the Russian flotilla. The first attempt on 8 August was unsuccessful, as it had taken too long to clear the Russian minefields to allow the minelayer Deutschland to lay a minefield of her own.

On 16 August 1915, a second attempt was made to enter the gulf: Nassau and Posen, four light cruisers, and 31 torpedo boats managed to breach the Russian defenses. On the first day of the assault, the German minesweeper T 46 was sunk, as was the destroyer V 99. The following day, Nassau and Posen engaged in an artillery duel with Slava, resulting in three hits on the Russian ship that forced her to retreat. By 19 August, the Russian minefields had been cleared, and the flotilla entered the gulf. Reports of Allied submarines in the area prompted the Germans to call off of the operation the following day. Nassau and Posen remained in the Gulf until 21 August, and while there assisted in the destruction of the gunboats Sivuch and Korietz. Admiral Hipper later remarked that,

"To keep valuable ships for a considerable time in a limited area in which enemy submarines were increasingly active, with the corresponding risk of damage and loss, was to indulge in a gamble out of all proportion to the advantage to be derived from the occupation of the Gulf before the capture of Riga from the land side."

==== Return to the North Sea ====
By the end of August Nassau and the rest of the High Seas Fleet had returned to their anchorages in the North Sea. The next operation conducted was a sweep into the North Sea on 11–12 September, though it ended without any action. Another sortie followed on 23–24 October during which the German fleet did not encounter any British forces. In November, KzS Robert Kühne relieved Köthner aboard Nassau, though he would remain in command for just three months.

On 12 January 1916, Admiral Reinhard Scheer replaced Pohl as the fleet commander; Scheer continued the aggressive fleet strategy of his predecessors. On 4 March 1916, Posen, Nassau, Westfalen, and Von der Tann steamed out to the Amrumbank to receive the auxiliary cruiser Möwe, which was returning from a raiding mission. Nassau was present during the fleet advance on 5–7 March, though this too ended without action. Further sorties were conducted on 26 March, 2–3 April, and 21–22 April, but none resulted in action with British forces. A bombardment mission followed two days later; Westfalen joined the battleship support for Hipper's battlecruisers while they attacked Yarmouth and Lowestoft on 24–25 April. During this operation, the battlecruiser Seydlitz was damaged by a British mine and had to return to port prematurely. Due to poor visibility, the operation was soon called off, leaving the British fleet no time to intercept the raiders.

==== Battle of Jutland ====
Maps showing the maneuvers of the British (blue) and German (red) fleets on 31 May – 1 June 1916

Nassau took part in the inconclusive Battle of Jutland on 31 May – 1 June 1916, in II Division of I Battle Squadron. For the majority of the battle, I Battle Squadron formed the center of the line of battle, behind Rear Admiral Behncke's III Battle Squadron, and followed by Rear Admiral Mauve's elderly pre-dreadnoughts of II Battle Squadron. Nassau was the third ship in the group of four, behind Rheinland and ahead of Westfalen; Posen was the squadron's flagship. When the German fleet reorganized into a nighttime cruising formation, the order of the ships was inadvertently reversed, and so Nassau was the second ship in the line, astern of Westfalen.

Between 17:48 and 17:52, eleven German dreadnoughts, including Nassau, engaged and opened fire on the British 2nd Light Cruiser Squadron; Nassau's target was the cruiser Southampton. Nassau is believed to have scored one hit on Southampton, at approximately 17:50 at a range of 20,100 yd (18,400 m), shortly after she began firing. The shell struck Southampton obliquely on her port side, and did not cause significant damage. Nassau then shifted her guns to the cruiser Dublin; firing ceased by 18:10. At 19:33, Nassau came into range of the British battleship Warspite; her main guns fired briefly, but after the 180-degree turn by the German fleet, the British ship was no longer within reach.

Nassau and the rest of I Squadron were again engaged by British light forces shortly after 22:00, including the light cruisers Caroline, Comus, and Royalist. Nassau followed her sister Westfalen in a 68° turn to starboard in order to evade any torpedoes that might have been fired. The two ships fired on Caroline and Royalist at a range of around 8,000 yd (7,300 m). The British ships turned away briefly, before turning about to launch torpedoes. Caroline fired two at Nassau; the first passed close to her bows and the second passed under the ship without exploding.

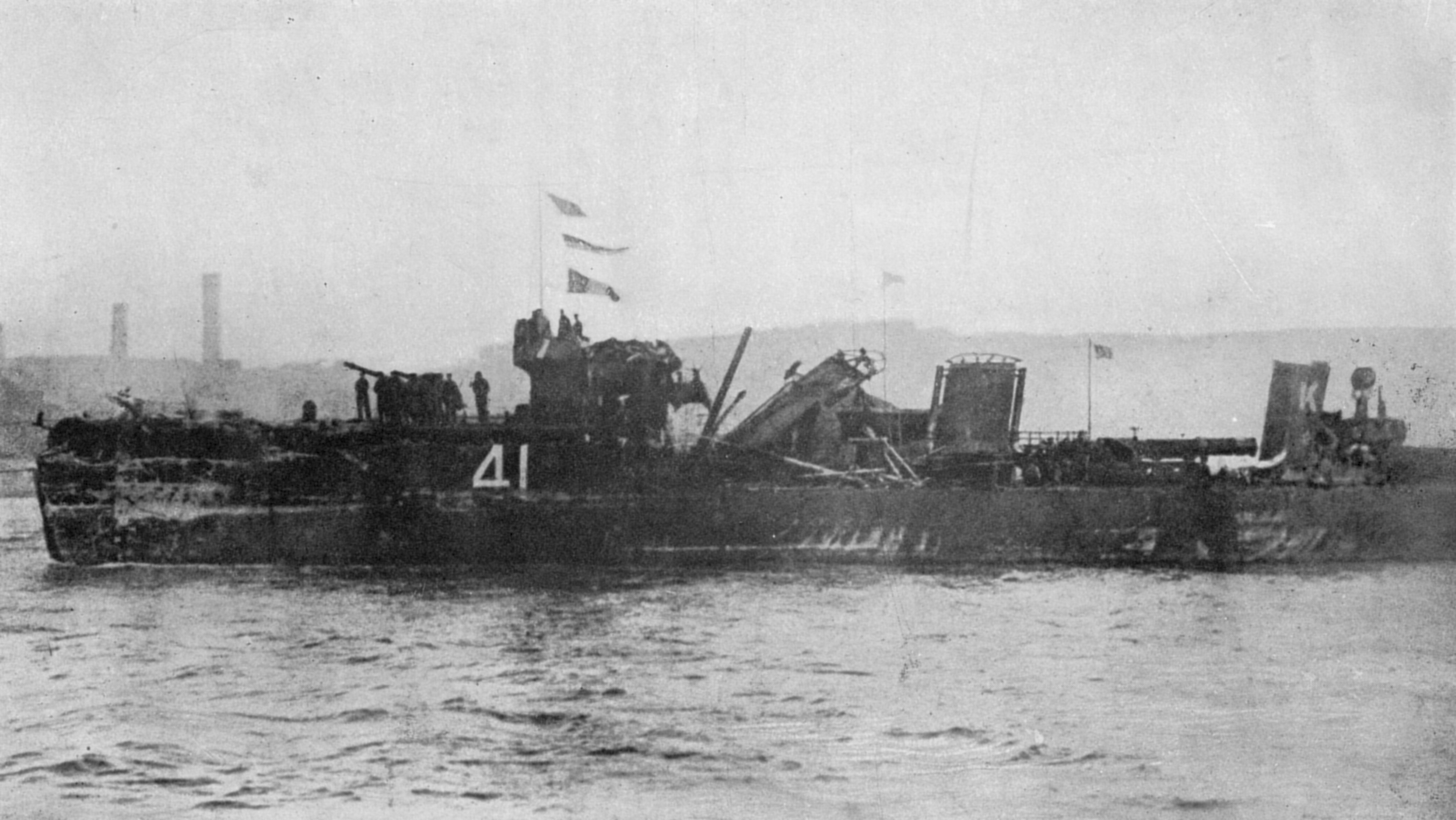
Damage to HMS Spitfire after being rammed by Nassau

At around midnight on 1 June, the German fleet was attempting to pass behind the British Grand Fleet when it encountered a line of British destroyers. Nassau came upon the destroyer Spitfire, and in the confusion, attempted to ram her. Spitfire tried to evade, but could not maneuver away fast enough, and the two ships collided. Nassau fired her forward 11-inch guns at the destroyer. They could not depress low enough for Nassau to be able to score a hit; nonetheless, the blast from the guns destroyed Spitfire's bridge. At that point, Spitfire was able to disengage from Nassau, and took with her a 6 m (20 ft) portion of Nassau's side plating. The collision disabled one of Nassau's 15 cm (5.9 in) guns, and left a 3.5 m (11.5 ft) gash above the waterline; this slowed the ship to 15 knots (28 km/h; 17 mph) until it could be repaired. During the confused action, Nassau was hit by two 4 in (10 cm) shells from the British destroyers, which damaged her searchlights and inflicted minor casualties.

Shortly after 01:00, Nassau and Thüringen encountered the British armored cruiser Black Prince. Thüringen opened fire first, and pummeled Black Prince with a total of 27 heavy-caliber shells and 24 shells from her secondary battery. Nassau and Ostfriesland joined in, followed by Friedrich der Grosse. The heavy fire quickly disabled the British cruiser and set her alight; following a tremendous explosion, she sank, taking her entire crew with her. The sinking Black Prince was directly in the path of Nassau; to avoid the wreck, the ship had to steer sharply towards III Battle Squadron. It was necessary for Nassau to reverse her engines to full speed astern to avoid a collision with Kaiserin. Nassau briefly lost contact with the rest of the battle fleet in the darkness, but she soon fell back into a position between the pre-dreadnoughts Hessen and Hannover. At around 03:00, several British destroyers attempted another torpedo attack on the German line. At approximately 03:10, three or four destroyers appeared in the darkness to port of Nassau; at a range of between 5,500 yd (5,000 m) to 4,400 yd (4,000 m), Nassau briefly fired on the ships before turning away 90° to avoid torpedoes.

Following her return to German waters, Nassau, her sisters Posen and Westfalen, and the Helgoland-class battleships Helgoland and Thüringen, took up defensive positions in the Jade roadstead for the night. In the course of the battle, Nassau was hit twice by secondary shells, though these hits caused no significant damage. Her casualties amounted to 11 men killed and 16 men wounded. During the course of the battle, she fired 106 main battery shells and 75 rounds from her secondary guns. Repairs were completed quickly, and Nassau was back with the fleet by 10 July 1916.

==== Later operations ====
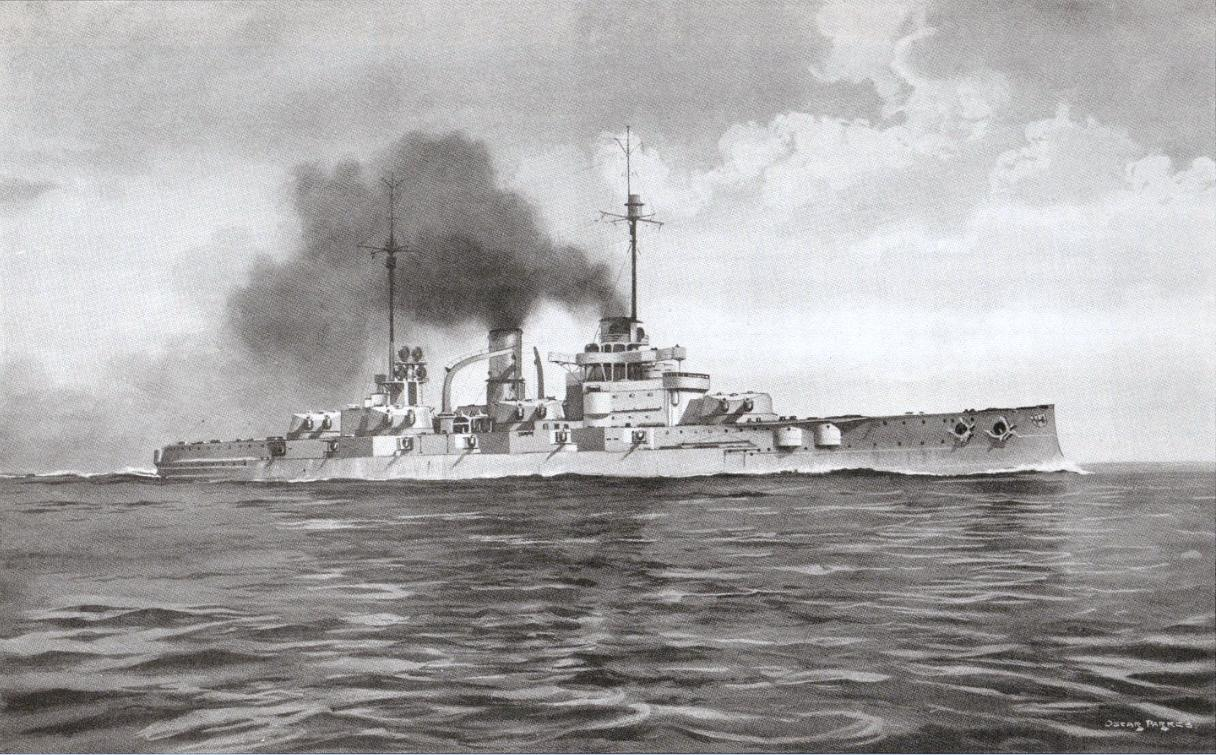
A recognition drawing prepared by the Royal Navy, with Nassau's main battery turned to starboard

Another fleet advance followed on 18–22 August, during which the I Scouting Group battlecruisers were to bombard the coastal town of Sunderland in an attempt to draw out and destroy Beatty's battlecruisers. As only two of the four German battlecruisers were still in fighting condition, three dreadnoughts were assigned to the Scouting Group for the operation: Markgraf, Grosser Kurfürst, and the newly commissioned Bayern. The High Seas Fleet, including Nassau, would trail behind and provide cover. At 06:00 on 19 August, Westfalen was torpedoed by the British submarine HMS E23 55 nautical miles (102 km; 63 mi) north of Terschelling; the ship remained afloat and was detached to return to port. The British were aware of the German plans and sortied the Grand Fleet to meet them. By 14:35, Admiral Scheer had been warned of the Grand Fleet's approach and, unwilling to engage the whole of the Grand Fleet just 11 weeks after the close call at Jutland, turned his forces around and retreated to German ports.

The fleet advanced as far as the Dogger Bank on 19–20 October. The operation led to a brief action on 19 October, during which a British submarine torpedoed the cruiser München. The failure of the operation (coupled with the action of 19 August) convinced the German naval command to abandon its aggressive fleet strategy. in favor of a resumption of the unrestricted submarine warfare campaign On 21 December, Nassau ran aground in the mouth of the Elbe. She was able to free herself, and repairs were effected in Hamburg at the Reihersteig Dockyard until 1 February 1917. While the ship was still under repair in January, KzS Victor Reclam arrived to take command of the ship.

In late 1917, light forces of the High Seas Fleet began interdicting British convoys to Norway, which prompted the British to detach battleships from the battle fleet to protect the convoys. The Germans were now presented with an opportunity for which they had been waiting the entire war: a portion of the Grand Fleet could be isolated and destroyed. Hipper planned the operation: the battlecruisers of I Scouting Group, along with light cruisers and destroyers, would attack one of the large convoys, while the rest of the High Seas Fleet would stand by, ready to attack the British battleship squadron. At 05:00 on 23 April 1918, Nassau and the rest of the fleet departed from the Schillig roadstead. Hipper ordered wireless transmissions be kept to a minimum, to prevent radio intercepts by British intelligence. At 06:10 the German battlecruisers had reached a position approximately 60 kilometers (37 mi) southwest of Bergen when the battlecruiser Moltke lost her inner starboard propeller, which severely damaged the ship's engines. Despite this setback, Hipper continued northward. By 14:00, Hipper's force had crossed the convoy route several times but had found nothing. At 14:10, Hipper turned his ships southward. By 18:37, the German fleet had made it back to the defensive minefields surrounding their bases. It was later discovered that the convoy had left port a day later than expected by the German planning staff.

Nassau, Ostfriesland, and Thüringen were formed into a special unit for Operation Schlußstein, a planned occupation of Saint Petersburg. On 8 August, Nassau took on 250 soldiers in Wilhelmshaven and then departed for the Baltic. The three ships reached the Baltic on 10 August, but the operation was postponed and eventually canceled. The special unit was dissolved on 21 August, and the battleships were back in Wilhelmshaven on the 23rd.

Nassau and her three sisters were to have taken part in a final fleet action at the end of October 1918, days before the Armistice was to take effect. The bulk of the High Seas Fleet was to have sortied from their base in Wilhelmshaven to engage the British Grand Fleet; Scheer—by now the Grand Admiral (Großadmiral) of the fleet—intended to inflict as much damage as possible on the British navy, to improve Germany's bargaining position, despite the expected casualties. Many of the war-weary sailors felt that the operation would disrupt the peace process and prolong the war. On the morning of 29 October 1918, the order was given to sail from Wilhelmshaven the following day. Starting on the night of 29 October, sailors on Thüringen and then on several other battleships mutinied. The unrest ultimately forced Hipper and Scheer to cancel the operation. The following month, KzS Hermann Bauer arrived to take command of the ship; he was to be Nassau's final captain.

==== Fate ====
Following the German collapse that had resulted in the Armistice of 11 November 1918, a significant portion of the High Seas Fleet was interned in Scapa Flow. Nassau and her three sisters were not among the ships listed for internment, so they remained at German ports. They had their guns disabled, along with the four Helgoland-class battleships. Under the terms of the Treaty of Versailles that formally ended the war in June 1919, Nassau and the other dreadnoughts that had remained in Germany were to be surrendered to the Allies under Article 185. Negotiations between the Allies over which country received what vessels, and what those ships could be used for began in November. While final decisions were still being made, the Allies decided that the ships in question were to sail to either a British or French port, and accordingly, on 1 April 1920, Nassau and Ostfriesland sailed for Rosyth, Britain, arriving on 5 April. On 7 April, Nassau was awarded to Japan; the Japanese had no need for the ship, so they sold her in June to British shipbreakers, who partially stripped useful equipment before re-selling Nassau to shipbreakers in Dordrecht, who in turn scrapped the ship in 1922.
