= HMS Spitfire (1912) =

Acasta-class destroyer

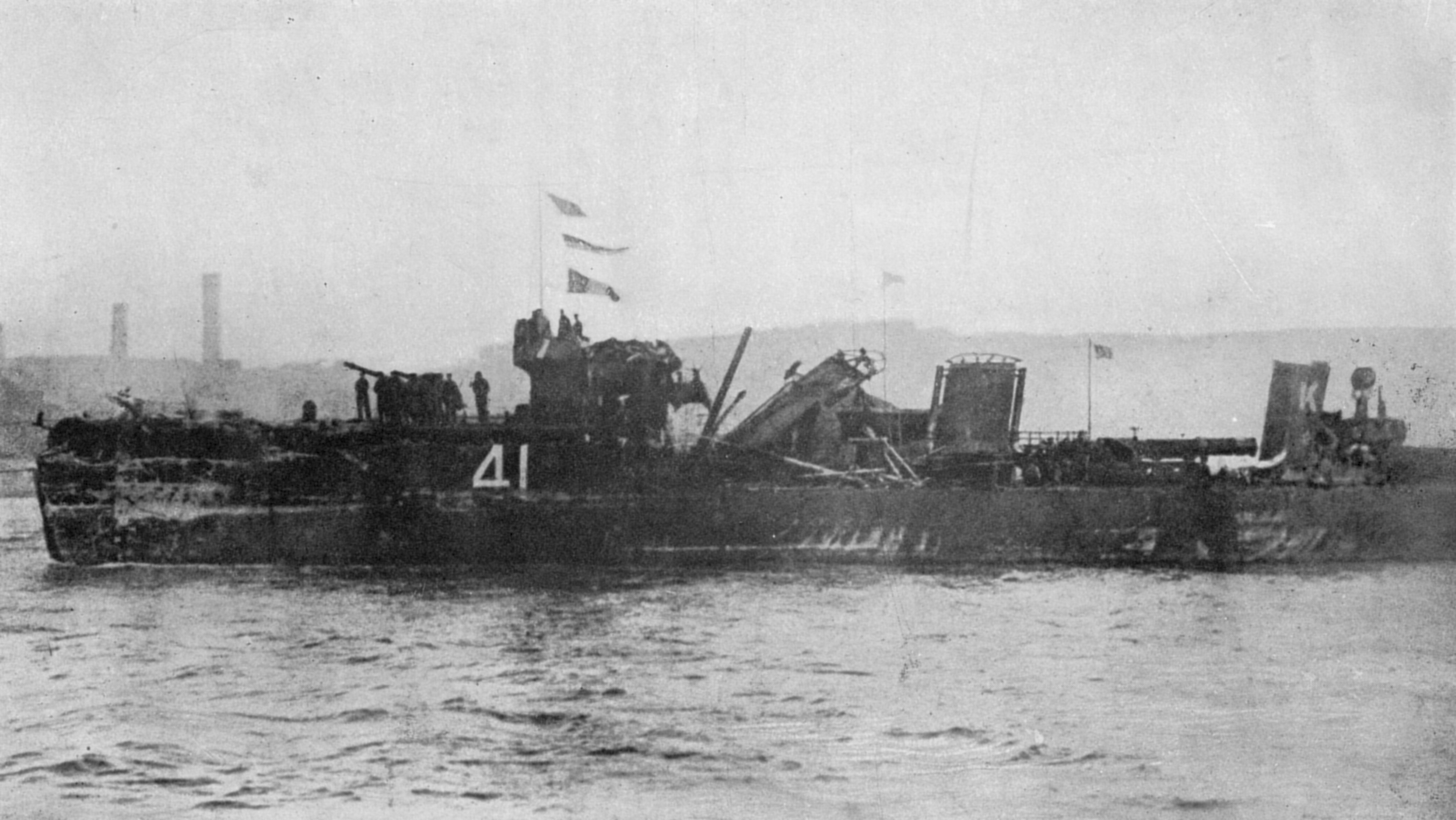
- Spitfire after having been rammed by the German battleship Nassau during the Battle of Jutland

History

United Kingdom
- Name: HMS Spitfire
- Builder: Swan, Hunter & Wigham Richardson, Wallsend
- Launched: 23 December 1912
- Fate: Sold for scrapping on 9 May 1921

General characteristics
- Class & type: Acasta-class destroyer
- Length: 267 ft 6 in (81.53 m)
- Beam: 27 ft (8.2 m)
- Draught: 10 ft 6 in (3.20 m)
- Propulsion: Yarrow-type water-tube boilers, Parsons steam turbines
- Speed: 29 knots (54 km/h; 33 mph)
- Armament: 3 × QF 4-inch (101.6 mm) L/40 Mark IV guns, mounting P Mk. IX; 1 × QF 2-pdr pom-pom Mk. II; 2 × single tubes for 21 inch (533 mm) torpedoes

HMS Spitfire was an Acasta-class destroyer of the Royal Navy. Spitfire took part in the battle of Jutland in 1916.

== Construction ==
She was launched on 23 December 1912 from the Wallsend yard of Swan, Hunter & Wigham Richardson and joined the Fourth Destroyer Flotilla.

== Service during First World War ==
From the beginning of the First World War, Spitfire and her flotilla were attached to the Grand Fleet.

=== Battle of Jutland ===
Amongst the small engagements which happened during the night of 31 May – 1 June 1916 during the Battle of Jutland was one between Spitfire and the German battleship Nassau. Spitfire evaded an attempt by Nassau to ram her, but the two ships nevertheless collided and Spitfire was seriously damaged, blast from Nassau's guns demolishing much of her upperworks, but she ripped off a 20 feet (6.1 m) section of the German ship's side plating. Both ships survived to return to port.

=== Assistance to the hospital ship Rhodesia ===
Spitfire helped in the rescue of survivors from the hospital/evacuation ship Rhodesia (formerly the Union Castle liner Galway Castle) which was torpedoed 160 miles off Fastnet by the German submarine U-82 on 12 September 1918.

== Disposal ==
Spitfire was sold to Thos. W. Ward shipbreakers for scrapping on 9 May 1921.

== Pennant numbers ==
| Pennant Number | From | To |
|---|---|---|
| H41 | 6 December 1914 | 1 January 1918 |
| H1A | 1 January 1918 | Early 1919 |
| H85 | Early 1919 | 9 May 1921 |
