= Russian gunboat Sivuch (1907) =

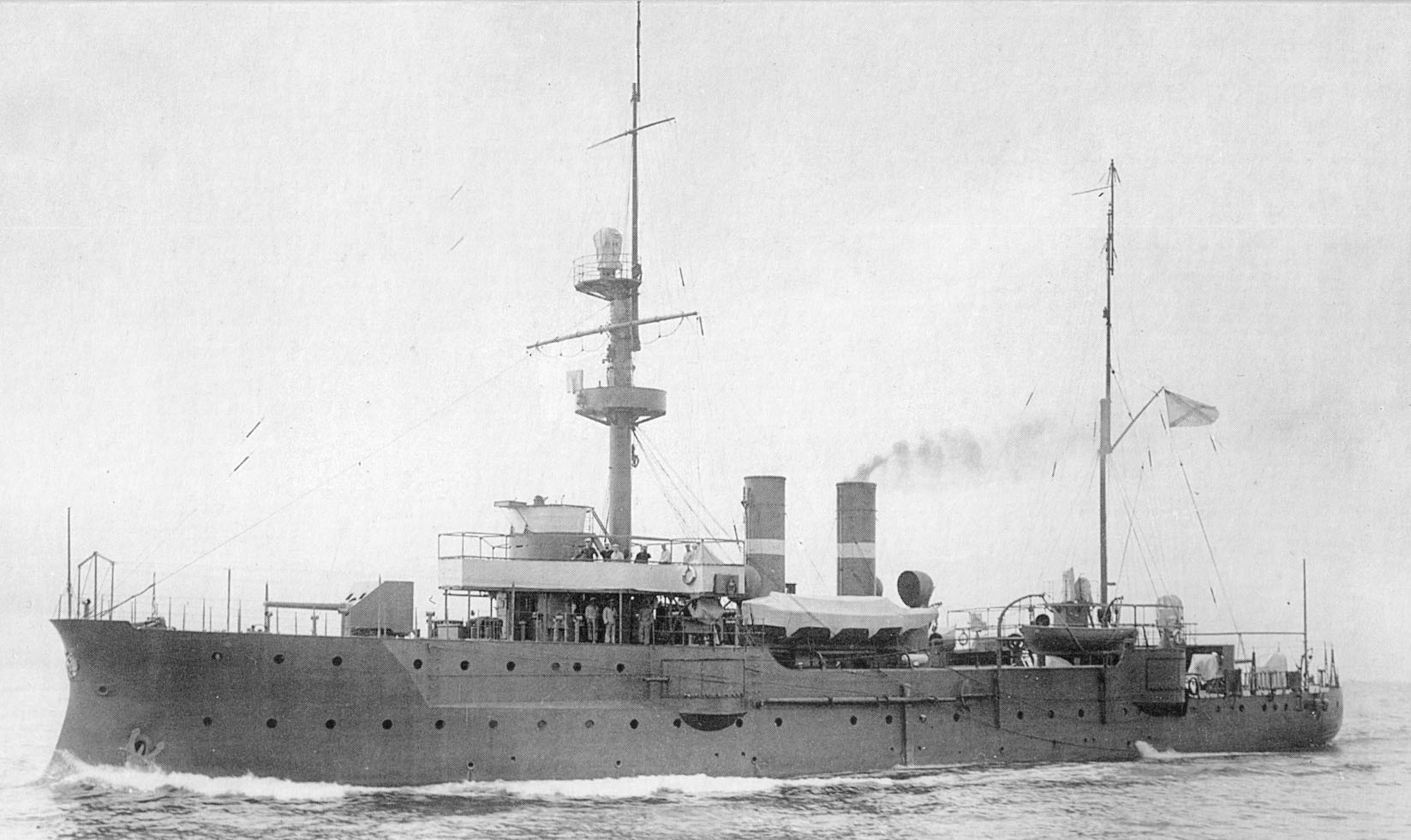

History

Russian Empire
- Name: Sivuch
- Namesake: Sealion
- Builder: Nevski
- Laid down: 1905
- Launched: 1 August 1907
- Completed: 1908
- Fate: Sunk 19 August 1915

General characteristics
- Class & type: Gilyak-class gunboat
- Displacement: 875 long tons (889 t)
- Length: 218 ft 2 in (66.5 m) (overall)
- Beam: 36 ft 6 in (11.1 m)
- Draught: 7 ft 11 in (2.4 m) maximum
- Propulsion: 4 Belleville boilers, 2-shaft VTE, 900 ihp (671 KW), 130 tons coal maximum
- Speed: 12 kn (22 km/h; 14 mph)
- Complement: 140
- Armament: 2 × 4.7in/45 guns; 8 × 11-pounder guns
- Notes: Military foremast, pole mainmast

Sivuch (Russian - Сивуч; "sealion") was a Gilyak-class gunboat of the Imperial Russian Navy. During World War I, she was sunk in the Gulf of Riga at the Battle of the Gulf of Riga on 19 August 1915 by the German battleships Nassau and Posen.

== Bibliography ==
- Budzbon, Przemysław (1985). "Russia". In Gray, Randal (ed.). Conway's All the World's Fighting Ships 1906–1921. Annapolis, Maryland: Naval Institute Press. pp. 291–325. ISBN 0-85177-245-5.
- Campbell, N. J. M. (1979). "Russia". In Chesneau, Roger & Kolesnik, Eugene M. (eds.). Conway's All the World's Fighting Ships 1860–1905. Mayflower Books. pp. 170–215. ISBN 0-8317-0302-4.
- Harris, Mark (2025). The First World War in the Baltic Sea. Vol. 1: Essen's Triumph, 1914 to February 1915. Helion. ISBN 978-1-804519-10-3.
