= SMS Deutschland (1914) =

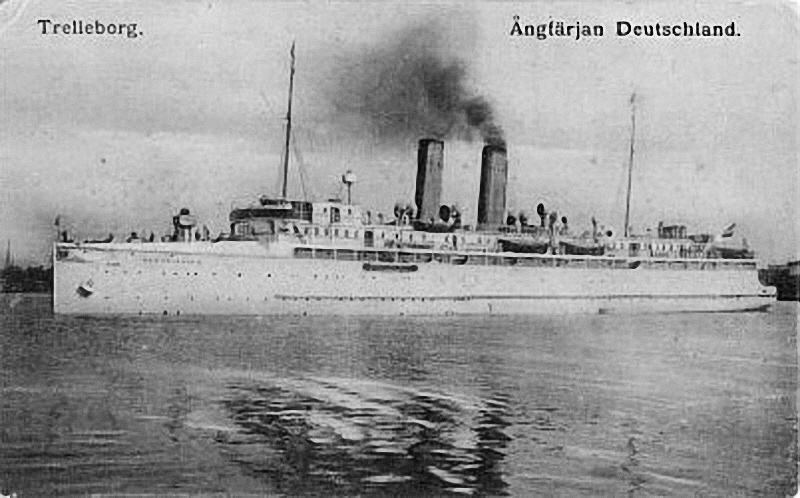
- Deutschland in 1909

History

German Empire
- Name: SMS Deutschland
- Builder: AG Vulcan, Stettin
- Launched: 9 February 1909
- Commissioned: 4 August 1914
- Fate: Scrapped in the 1960s

General characteristics
- Displacement: 4,200 t (4,600 short tons)
- Length: 113.8 m (373 ft)
- Beam: 16.26 m (53.3 ft)
- Draft: 4.9 m (16 ft)
- Propulsion: 5,000 shp
- Speed: 16.5 knots (31 km/h)
- Armament: 4 × 88 mm guns; 2 × 50 mm guns; 420 mines

SMS Deutschland was a German ferry commissioned as a minelayer during World War I. The ship served primarily in the Baltic Sea, including during the Battle of the Gulf of Riga. The ship was launched on 17 February 1909 at the AG Vulcan shipyard in Stettin. Deutschland was conscripted into military service as a mine layer, on 4 August 1914. The ship returned to ferry service after the war, but was again drafted into the German navy and renamed Stralsund in 1940, for participation in the abortive invasion of England. The ship fell into Soviet hands following the end of World War II, was renamed Orion and subsequently Aniva (Анива). The ship was eventually retired and scrapped in the 1960s.

== Service history ==
=== World War I ===
On 17 August 1914, Deutschland sailed to the entrance of the Gulf of Finland, under the escort of the light cruisers Augsburg and Magdeburg and three destroyers. The German flotilla was met by the Russian armored cruisers Admiral Makarov and Gromoboi. As a result of the Russian naval presence, Deutschland had to lay her mines approximately 45 miles from the planned location. The Russian admiral was under the mistaken impression that the German armored cruisers Roon and Prinz Heinrich were on the scene as well, and so he did not attack the German ships.

On 6 December 1914, Deutschland laid mines in the Gulf of Bothnia, off the ports of Pori and Rauma. Three Swedish steamers, Everilda, Luna and Norra-Sverige were sunk outside Pori. The series of sinkings stopped all ship traffic between Sweden and Finland for several days On 24 May 1915, Deutschland and an escort of cruisers sailed into the Gulf of Finland, to lay mines southeast of the island of Utö.

==== Battle of the Gulf of Riga ====
In August 1915, several heavy units of the High Seas Fleet were transferred to the Baltic to participate in the foray into the Riga Gulf. The intention was to destroy the Russian naval forces in the area, including the pre-dreadnought Slava. During the operation, Deustchland was to block the entrance to the Moon Sound with mines. The German forces, under the command of Vice Admiral Hipper, included the four Nassau-class and four Helgoland-class battleships, the battlecruisers Moltke, Von der Tann, and Seydlitz, and a number of smaller craft.

On 8 August, the first attempt to clear the gulf was made; the old battleships Braunschweig and Elsass kept the Slava at bay while minesweepers cleared a path through the inner belt of mines. During this period, the rest of the German fleet remained in the Baltic and provided protection against other units of the Russian fleet. However, the approach of nightfall meant that Deutschland would be unable to mine the entrance to Moon Sound in time, and so the operation was broken off.

On 16 August, a second attempt was made to enter the gulf. The dreadnoughts Nassau and Posen, four light cruisers, and 31 torpedo boats breached the defenses to the gulf. Nassau and Posen engaged in an artillery duel with Slava, resulting in three hits on the Russian ship that prompted her withdrawal. After three days, the Russian minefields had been cleared, and the flotilla entered the gulf on 19 August, but reports of Allied submarines in the area prompted a German withdrawal from the gulf the following day.
