= SMS Posen =

Nassau-class battleship of the German Imperial Navy

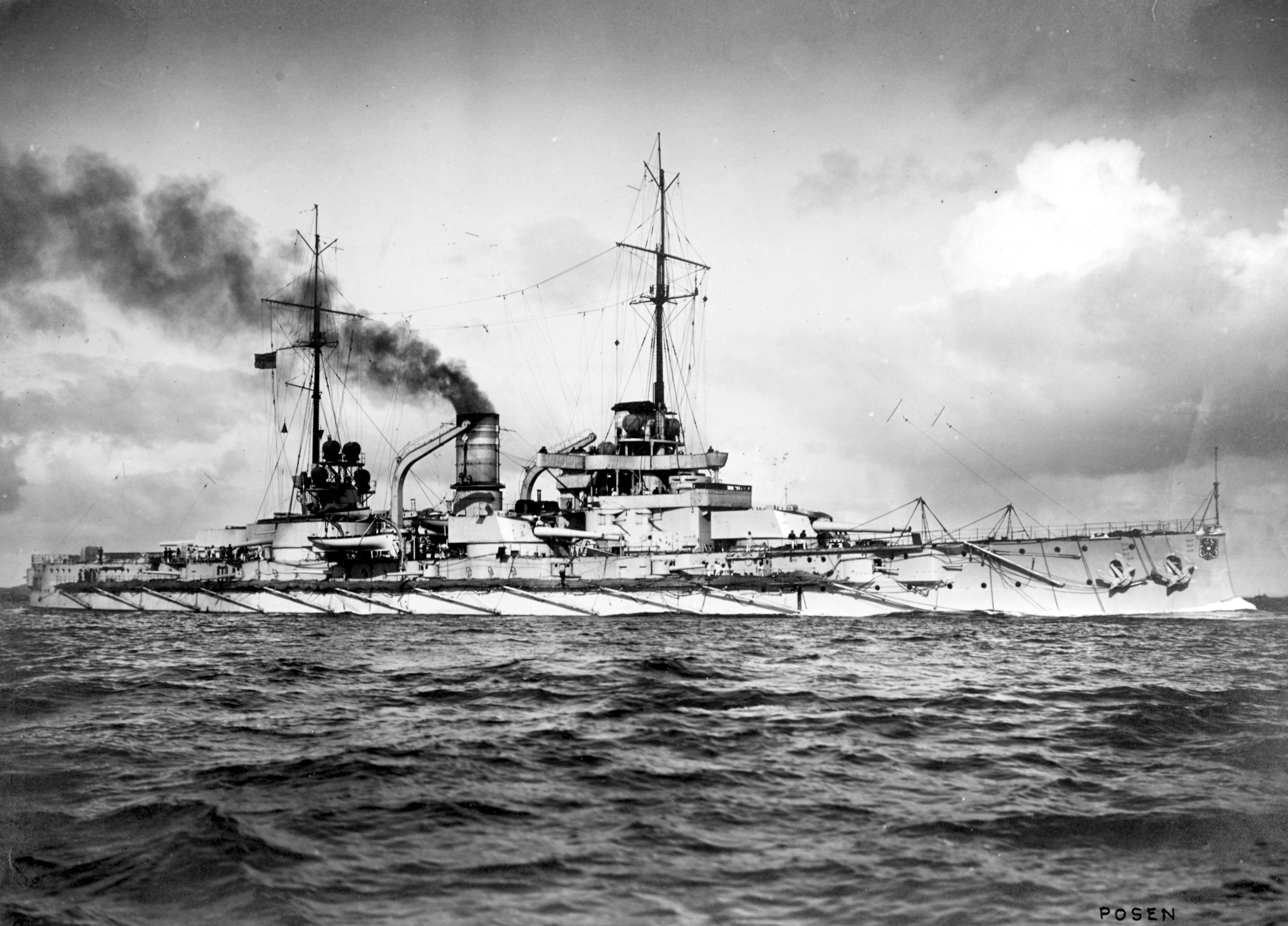
- Posen underway, 1910

History

German Empire
- Namesake: Province of Posen
- Builder: Germaniawerft, Kiel
- Laid down: 11 June 1907
- Launched: 12 December 1908
- Commissioned: 31 May 1910
- Decommissioned: 16 December 1918
- Stricken: 5 November 1919
- Fate: Ceded to Great Britain 1920. Scrapped 1922

General characteristics
- Class & type: Nassau-class battleship
- Displacement: Normal: 18,873 t (18,575 long tons); Full load: 21,000 t (21,000 long tons)
- Length: 146.1 m (479 ft 4 in)
- Beam: 26.9 m (88 ft 3 in)
- Draft: 8.9 m (29 ft 2 in)
- Installed power: 12 × water-tube boilers; 22,000 PS (21,700 ihp; 16,180 kW)
- Propulsion: 3 × triple-expansion steam engines; 3 × screw propellers
- Speed: Designed: 19 knots (35 km/h; 22 mph); Maximum: 20 knots (37 km/h; 23 mph)
- Range: At 12 knots (22 km/h; 14 mph): 8,300 nmi (15,400 km; 9,600 mi)
- Complement: 40 officers; 968 men
- Armament: 12 × 28 cm (11 in) SK L/45 guns; 12 × 15 cm (5.9 in) SK L/45 guns; 16 × 8.8 cm (3.5 in) SK L/45 guns; 6 × 45 cm (17.7 in) torpedo tubes
- Armor: Belt: 300 mm (11.8 in); Turrets: 280 mm (11 in); Deck: 80 mm (3.1 in); Conning Tower: 400 mm (15.7 in)

SMS Posen (Note: "SMS" stands for "Seiner Majestät Schiff", or "His Majesty's Ship".) was one of four battleships in the Nassau class, the first dreadnoughts built for the German Imperial Navy (Kaiserliche Marine). The ship was laid down at the Germaniawerft shipyard in Kiel on 11 June 1907, launched on 12 December 1908, and commissioned into the High Seas Fleet on 31 May 1910. She was equipped with a main battery of twelve 28 cm (11 in) guns in six twin turrets in an unusual hexagonal arrangement.

The ship served with her three sister ships for the majority of World War I. She saw extensive service in the North Sea, where she took part in several fleet sorties. These culminated in the Battle of Jutland on 31 May – 1 June 1916, where Posen was heavily engaged in night-fighting against British light forces. In the confusion, the ship accidentally rammed the light cruiser SMS Elbing, which suffered serious damage and was scuttled later in the night.

The ship also conducted several deployments to the Baltic Sea against the Russian Navy. In the first of these, Posen supported a German naval assault in the Battle of the Gulf of Riga. The ship was sent back to the Baltic in 1918 to support the White Finns in the Finnish Civil War. At the end of the war, Posen remained in Germany while the majority of the fleet was interned in Scapa Flow. In 1919, following the scuttling of the German fleet at Scapa Flow, she was ceded to the British as a replacement for the ships that had been sunk. She was then sent to ship-breakers in the Netherlands and scrapped in 1922.

== Design ==
Design work on the Nassau class began in late 1903 in the context of the Anglo-German naval arms race; at the time, battleships of foreign navies had begun to carry increasingly heavy secondary batteries, including Italian and American ships with 20.3 cm (8 in) guns and British ships with 23.4 cm (9.2 in) guns, outclassing the previous German battleships of the Deutschland class with their 17 cm (6.7 in) secondaries. German designers initially considered ships equipped with 21 cm (8.3 in) secondary guns, but erroneous reports in early 1904 that the British Lord Nelson-class battleships would be equipped with a secondary battery of as many as ten 25.4 cm (10 in) guns prompted them to consider an even more powerful ship armed with an all-big-gun armament consisting of eight 28 cm (11 in) guns. This initial version was approved in March 1905, but further developments were incorporated over the course of the year, in part due to lessons learned during the on-going Russo-Japanese War. By January 1906, the design was refined into a larger vessel with twelve of the guns, by which time Britain had begun work on the all-big-gun battleship HMS Dreadnought.

=== Characteristics ===
Plan and profile drawing of the Nassau class

Posen was 146.1 m (479 ft) long, 26.9 m (88 ft 3.1 in) wide, and had a draft of 8.9 m (29 ft 2.4 in). She displaced 18,873 metric tons (18,575 long tons) with a standard load, and 20,535 t (20,211 long tons) fully laden. (Note: According to Erich Gröner, this figure is calculated as "25 to 50 percent full load...and [was] used in the German navy since 1882 as a basis for performance and speed calculations.") She had a flush deck and a ram bow, a common feature for warships of the period. Posen had a fairly small superstructure, consisting primarily of forward and aft conning towers. She was fitted with a pair of pole masts for signaling and observation purposes. The ship had a crew of 40 officers and 968 enlisted men.

Posen retained 3-shaft triple expansion engines instead of the more advanced turbine engines. Steam was provided to the engines by twelve coal-fired water-tube boilers, which were vented through two funnels. Her propulsion system was rated at 22,000 metric horsepower (22,000 ihp; 16,000 kW) and provided a top speed of 20 knots (37 km/h; 23 mph). She had a cruising radius of 8,300 nautical miles (15,400 km; 9,600 mi) at a speed of 12 knots (22 km/h; 14 mph). (Note: This type of machinery was chosen at the request of both Admiral Alfred von Tirpitz and the Navy's construction department; the latter stated in 1905 that the "use of turbines in heavy warships does not recommend itself." This decision was based solely on cost: at the time, Parsons held a monopoly on steam turbines and required a 1 million gold mark royalty fee for every turbine engine made. German firms were not ready to begin production of turbines on a large scale until 1910.)

Posen carried a main battery of twelve 28 cm (11 in) SK L/45 (Note: In Imperial German Navy gun nomenclature, "SK" (Schnelladekanone) denotes that the gun is quick firing, while "L/45" provides the length of the gun in terms of the diameter of the barrel. In this case, the L/45 gun is 45 calibers, which means that the gun is 45 times as long as its diameter.) guns in six gun turrets arranged in an unusual hexagonal configuration. One was placed forward, another toward the stern, and the remaining four were placed on the wings, two per broadside. Her secondary armament consisted of twelve 15 cm (5.9 in) SK L/45 guns, mounted in casemates located amidships. Close-range defense against torpedo boats was provided by a tertiary battery of sixteen 8.8 cm (3 in) SK L/45 guns, which were also mounted in casemates. Later in her career, two of the 8.8 cm guns were replaced with high-angle Flak mountings of the same caliber for defense against aircraft. The ship was also armed with six 45 cm (17.7 in) submerged torpedo tubes. One tube was mounted in the bow, another in the stern, and two on each broadside, on either ends of the torpedo bulkhead.

The ship's hull was protected by heavy armor plate consisting of Krupp cemented steel. The belt armor along the sides of the hull was 29 cm (11.5 in) thick in the central portion, tapering down to 10 cm (4 in) at the bow. The belt was reinforced by an armored deck that angled downward at the sides to connect to the bottom edge of the belt. The deck was 3.8 cm (1.5 in) on the flat portion, while the sloped sides increased in thickness to 5.8 cm (2.3 in). Posen's main battery turrets had 28 cm of Krupp steel on their faces. Her forward conning tower had 30 cm (11.8 in) of armor plate on the sides, while the aft tower received only 20 cm (7.9 in) on the sides.

== Service history ==
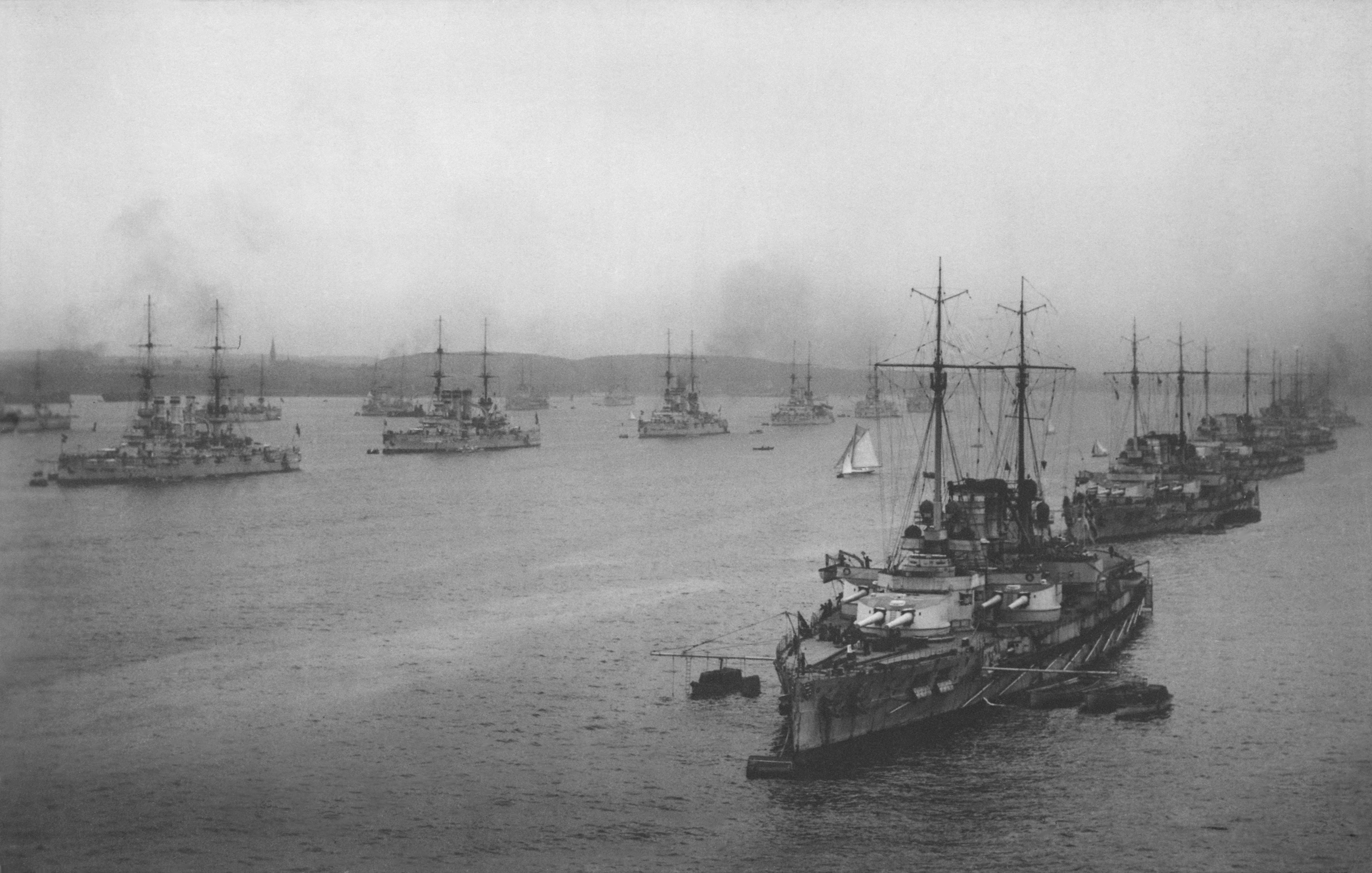
Posen and the rest of I Battle Squadron in Kiel before the war

Posen was ordered under the provisional name Ersatz Baden, as a replacement for the Baden, one of the elderly Sachsen-class ironclads. (Note: German warships were ordered under provisional names. Additions to the fleet were given a single letter; ships intended to replace older or lost vessels were ordered as "Ersatz (name of the ship to be replaced)".) She was laid down on 11 June 1907 at the Germaniawerft shipyard in Kiel. As with her sister Nassau, construction proceeded under absolute secrecy; detachments of soldiers guarded the shipyard and also guarded contractors that supplied building materials, such as Krupp. The ship was launched a year and a half later, on 12 December 1908. Wilhelm August Hans von Waldow-Reitzenstein, the president of the ship's namesake province gave a speech at her launching, and Posen was christened by Johanna von Radolin, the wife of Hugo Fürst von Radolin, a German diplomat who hailed from Posen. Initial trials were conducted through April 1910, followed by final fitting-out in May. The ship was commissioned into the fleet on 31 May, under the command of Kapitän zur See (KzS—Captain at Sea) Otto Back. Sea trials were conducted afterward and completed by 27 August. In total, her construction cost the German government 36,920,000 marks.

After completing her trials in August 1910, Posen left Kiel for Wilhelmshaven, where she arrived on 7 September. As the German Imperial Navy had chronic shortages of trained sailors, many of the crew were then assigned to other ships. (Note: Of the problem, Admiral Iwan Oldekop stated in November 1912: "There is almost no more personnel on land. Garrison watch duty can no longer be conducted according to regulations...The Navy units [in Kiel] are equally exhausted as in Wilhelmshaven. Complaints concerning lack of personnel on land are the same.") These crewmembers were replaced with personnel from the old pre-dreadnought battleship Wittelsbach, which was decommissioned on 20 September. After their commissioning, all four Nassau-class ships served as a unit, II Division of I Battle Squadron, with Posen as the divisional flagship. The ships participated in a training cruise in the Baltic Sea late in 1910.

Over the next four years, Posen participated in several training exercises with the rest of the fleet before the outbreak of war. In 1911, Konteradmiral (Rear Admiral) Karl Zimmermann hoisted his flag aboard Posen. In March that year, the fleet conducted exercises in the Skagerrak and Kattegat, and further exercises were held in May. Posen and the rest of the fleet received British and American naval squadrons at Kiel in June and July, after which the fleet took its annual summer cruise to Norway. The year's autumn maneuvers were confined to the Baltic and the Kattegat. Another fleet review was held afterward, during the exercises for a visiting Austro-Hungarian delegation that included Archduke Franz Ferdinand and Admiral Rudolf Montecuccoli.

The next year followed a similar pattern until mid-1912, when the summer cruise was confined to the Baltic due to the Agadir Crisis; the naval command sought to avoid exposing the fleet during the period of heightened tension with Britain and France. The September exercises were conducted off Helgoland in the North Sea; the following month, KzS Richard Lange relieved Back as the ship's commander. Another winter cruise into the Baltic followed at the end of the year. The training program for 1913 proceeded in much the same pattern as in previous years. The training schedule returned to normal for 1913 and 1914, and the summer cruises again went to Norway. For the 1914 cruise, the fleet departed for Norwegian waters on 14 July, some two weeks after the assassination of Archduke Franz Ferdinand in Sarajevo. The probability of war cut the cruise short; Posen and the rest of the fleet were back in Wilhelmshaven by 29 July.

=== World War I ===
Sketch of Posen by Oscar Parkes

At midnight on 4 August, the United Kingdom declared war on Germany. Posen and the rest of the fleet conducted several advances into the North Sea to support Rear Admiral Franz von Hipper's I Scouting Group battlecruisers. The battlecruisers raided British coastal towns in an attempt to lure out portions of the Grand Fleet where they could be destroyed by the High Seas Fleet. The first such operation was the raid on Scarborough, Hartlepool and Whitby on 15–16 December 1914. On the evening of 15 December, the German battle fleet of 12 dreadnoughts—including Posen and her three sisters—and eight pre-dreadnoughts came to within 10 nmi (19 km; 12 mi) of an isolated squadron of six British battleships. Skirmishes between the rival destroyer screens in the darkness convinced the German fleet commander, Admiral Friedrich von Ingenohl, that he was faced with the Grand Fleet, now deployed in its battle formation. Under orders from Kaiser Wilhelm II to avoid risking the fleet unnecessarily, Ingenohl broke off the engagement and turned the battlefleet back toward Germany.

Posen next took part in the fleet advance on 24 January 1915 to support I Scouting Group after it had been ambushed by the British 1st and 2nd Battlecruiser Squadrons during the Battle of Dogger Bank, though she again saw no action, as the battle had ended before the High Seas Fleet arrived late in the afternoon. Following the loss of the armored cruiser SMS Blücher at the Battle of Dogger Bank, the Kaiser removed Ingenohl from his post on 2 February. Admiral Hugo von Pohl replaced him as commander of the fleet. Pohl conducted a series of fleet advances in 1915 in which Posen took part; in the first one on 29–30 March, the fleet steamed out to the north of Terschelling and return without incident. Another followed on 17–18 April, where the fleet covered a mining operation by II Scouting Group. Three days later, on 21–22 April, the High Seas Fleet advanced towards the Dogger Bank, though again failed to meet any British forces. In mid-May, Posen entered the shipyard for periodic maintenance, which was completed in time for the next fleet operation. The fleet next went to sea on 29–30 May, advancing as far as Schiermonnikoog before being forced to turn back by inclement weather. On 10 August, the fleet steamed to the north of Helgoland to cover the return of the auxiliary cruiser Meteor.

==== Battle of the Gulf of Riga ====
In August 1915, a special unit from the German fleet attempted to clear the Russian-held Gulf of Riga in order to assist the German Army, which was planning an assault on Riga. To do so, the German planners intended to drive off or destroy the Russian naval forces in the Gulf, which included the pre-dreadnought battleship Slava and some smaller gunboats and destroyers. The German battle fleet was accompanied by several mine-warfare vessels. These ships were tasked with clearing Russian minefields and laying a series of their own minefields in the northern entrance to the gulf, to prevent Russian naval reinforcements from reaching the area. The assembled German flotilla included Posen and her three sister ships, the four Helgoland-class battleships, the battlecruisers Von der Tann, Moltke, and Seydlitz, and several pre-dreadnoughts, operating under the command of Hipper, now a vice admiral. The eight battleships were to provide cover for the forces engaging the Russian flotilla. The first attempt on 8 August was unsuccessful, as it had taken too long to clear the Russian minefields to allow the minelayer Deutschland to lay a minefield of her own.

The Germans planned a second attempt, and on 15 August, the overall naval commander of the operation—Vizeadmiral Ehrhard Schmidt—made Posen his flagship. Posen and Nassau led the second attempt to breach the defenses of the gulf the following day. The two dreadnoughts were accompanied by 4 light cruisers and 31 torpedo boats. On the first day of the assault the Germans broke through the Russian forces, but two German light craft—the minesweeper T46 and the destroyer V99—were sunk. Posen and Nassau engaged a pair of Russian gunboats, Sivuch and Korietz. Sivuch was sunk that day and Korietz was severely damaged; the ship managed to limp away but had to be scuttled the following day. On the 17th, Posen and Nassau engaged Slava at long range; they scored three hits on the Russian ship and forced her to return to port. By 19 August, the Russian minefields had been cleared and the flotilla entered the Gulf. Reports of Allied submarines in the area prompted the Germans to call off the operation the following day.

Hipper later remarked, "To keep valuable ships for a considerable time in a limited area in which enemy submarines were increasingly active, with the corresponding risk of damage and loss, was to indulge in a gamble out of all proportion to the advantage to be derived from the occupation of the Gulf before the capture of Riga from the land side." In fact, the battlecruiser Moltke had been torpedoed that morning. On 21 August, Schmidt had his flag hauled down from Posen and disbanded the special unit. The operation nevertheless achieved significant strategic goals, since it reduced the Russian naval command's desire to deploy its few modern warships into the central Baltic, and the threat of future German amphibious operations led the Russian Army to withdraw the Guards Corps from the fighting on the Eastern Front to defend Estonia.

==== Return to the North Sea ====
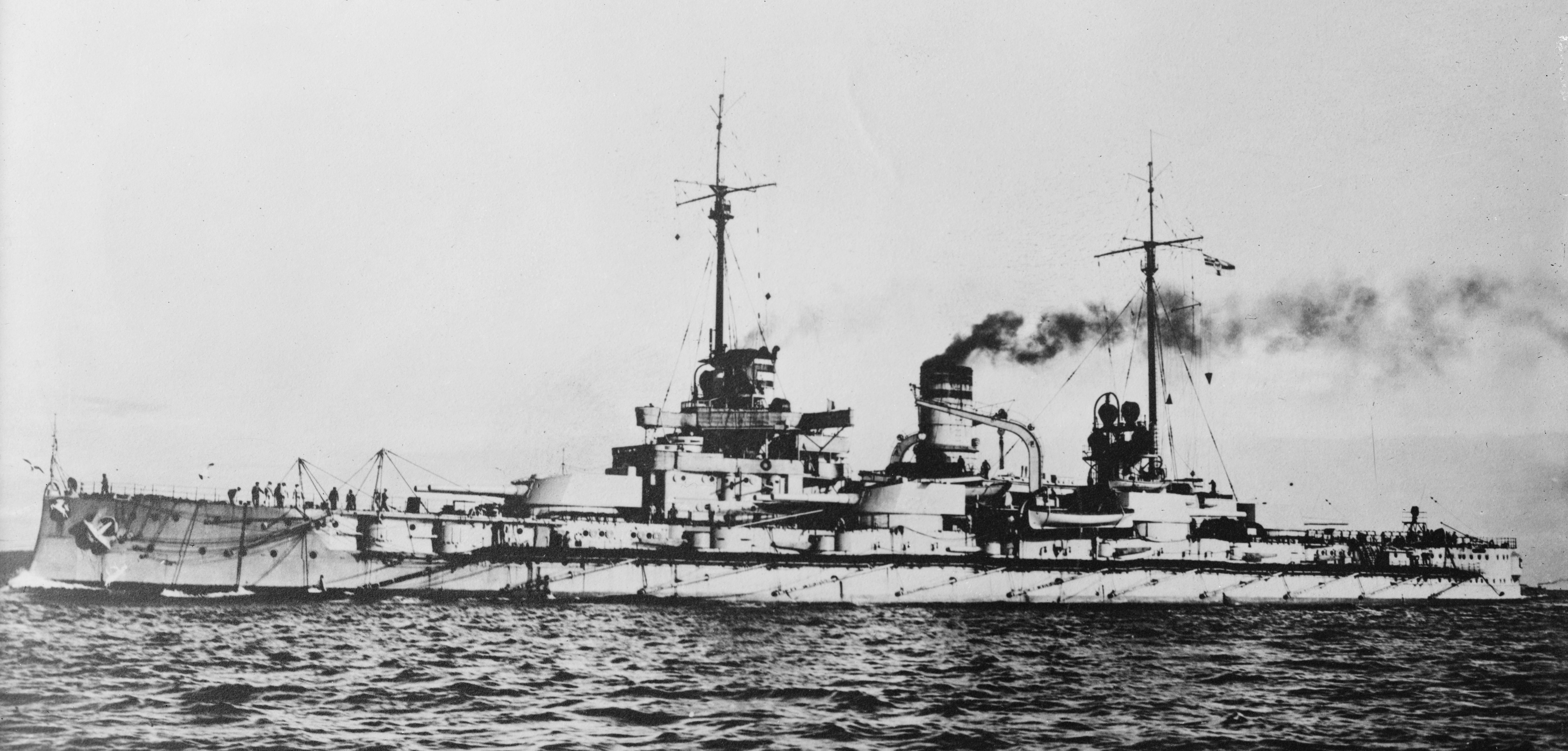
SMS Westfalen

By the end of August Posen and the rest of the High Seas Fleet had returned to their anchorages in the North Sea. The next operation conducted was a sweep into the North Sea on 11–12 September, though it ended without any action. Another fleet sortie followed on 23–24 October without encountering any British forces. On 12 January 1916, Admiral Reinhard Scheer replaced Pohl as the fleet commander; Scheer continued the aggressive fleet strategy of his predecessors. On 4 March 1916, Posen, Nassau, Westfalen, and Von der Tann steamed out to the Amrumbank to receive the auxiliary cruiser Möwe, which was returning from a raiding mission. Nassau was present during the fleet advance on 5–7 March, though this too ended without action. Further sorties were conducted on 26 March, 2–3 April, and 21–22 April, but none resulted in action with British forces. A bombardment mission followed two days later; Westfalen joined the battleship support for Hipper's battlecruisers while they attacked Yarmouth and Lowestoft on 24–25 April. During this operation, the battlecruiser Seydlitz was damaged by a British mine and had to return to port prematurely. Due to poor visibility, the operation was soon called off, leaving the British fleet no time to intercept the raiders.

==== Battle of Jutland ====
Maps showing the maneuvers of the British (blue) and German (red) fleets on 31 May – 1 June 1916

Scheer immediately planned another attack on the British coast after the failed attempt against Yarmouth. The damage to Seydlitz and condenser trouble on several of the III Battle Squadron dreadnoughts delayed the plan until the end of May. The German battlefleet departed the Jade at 03:30 on 31 May. Posen was assigned to II Division of I Battle Squadron as the flagship of Rear Admiral W. Engelhardt. Posen was the first ship in the division, ahead of her three sisters. II Division was the last unit of dreadnoughts in the fleet; they were followed by only the elderly pre-dreadnoughts of II Battle Squadron.

Between 17:48 and 17:52, Posen and ten other German battleships engaged the British 2nd Light Cruiser Squadron, though the range and poor visibility prevented effective fire. Shortly thereafter, two British destroyers—Nomad and Nestor—came under intense fire from the German line. Posen fired at Nestor with both her main battery and secondary guns. At 18:35, Nestor exploded and sank under the combined fire of eight battleships. By 20:15, the German fleet had faced the Grand Fleet for a second time and was forced to turn away; in doing so, the order of the German line was reversed. Posen was now the fourth ship in the line, astern of her three sisters.

At around 21:20, Posen and her sister ships were engaged by the battlecruisers of the 3rd Battlecruiser Squadron. Posen was the only ship of I Battle Squadron to be able to make out a target, which turned out to be the battlecruisers HMS Princess Royal and Indomitable. Posen opened fire at 21:28 at a range of 10,000 m (11,000 yd); she scored one hit on Princess Royal at 21:32 and straddled Indomitable several times, surrounding her with a salvo of shells, before ceasing fire at 21:35.

At about 00:30, the leading units of the German line encountered British destroyers and cruisers. A violent firefight at close range ensued; the leading German battleships, including Posen, opened fire on several British warships. In the confusion, the light cruiser Elbing passed through the German line directly in front of Posen and was rammed. Posen was undamaged, but both of Elbing's engine rooms were flooded and the ship came to a halt. Two and a half hours later, Elbing spotted several approaching British destroyers, and her captain gave the order to scuttle the ship.

Shortly before 01:00, the German line engaged a flotilla of British destroyers. Posen spotted the destroyers Fortune, Porpoise, and Garland at very close range; she opened fire on the first two ships at ranges between 800 and 1,600 m (870 and 1,750 yd), seriously damaging Porpoise. Fortune quickly sank under fire from Posen and several other battleships, but not before firing two torpedoes which Posen had to evade. At 01:25, Westfalen illuminated the destroyer Ardent and opened fire; Posen joined her shortly thereafter and reported several hits at ranges of 1,000 to 1,200 m (1,100 to 1,300 yd).

Despite the ferocity of the night fighting, the High Seas Fleet punched through the British destroyer forces and reached Horns Reef by 04:00 on 1 June. The German fleet reached Wilhelmshaven a few hours later, where Posen and several other battleships from I Battle Squadron took up defensive positions in the outer roadstead. Over the course of the battle, the ship had fired fifty-three 28 cm shells, sixty-four 15 cm rounds, and thirty-two 8.8 cm shells. The ship and her crew emerged from the battle completely unscathed by enemy fire.

==== Later operations ====
Another fleet advance followed on 18–22 August, during which the I Scouting Group battlecruisers were to bombard the coastal town of Sunderland in an attempt to draw out and destroy Beatty's battlecruisers. As only two of the four German battlecruisers were still in fighting condition, three dreadnoughts were assigned to the Scouting Group for the operation: Markgraf, Grosser Kurfürst, and the newly commissioned Bayern. The High Seas Fleet, including Posen, would trail behind and provide cover. At 06:00 on 19 August, Westfalen was torpedoed by the British submarine HMS E23 55 nautical miles (102 km; 63 mi) north of Terschelling; the ship remained afloat and was detached to return to port. The British were aware of the German plans and sortied the Grand Fleet to meet them. By 14:35, Admiral Scheer had been warned of the Grand Fleet's approach and, unwilling to engage the whole of the Grand Fleet just 11 weeks after the close call at Jutland, turned his forces around and retreated to German ports.

The fleet advanced as far as the Dogger Bank on 19–20 October. The operation led to a brief action on 19 October, during which a British submarine torpedoed the cruiser München. The failure of the operation (coupled with the action of 19 August) convinced the German naval command to abandon its aggressive fleet strategy in favor of a resumption of the unrestricted submarine warfare campaign. Beginning in June 1917, Wilhelm von Krosigk served as the ship's commanding officer; he held this position until the end of the war in November 1918. Posen sortied to assist the German forces engaged in the Second Battle of Helgoland Bight on 18 November 1917, but did not reach the area until the battle had ended.

==== Expedition to Finland ====
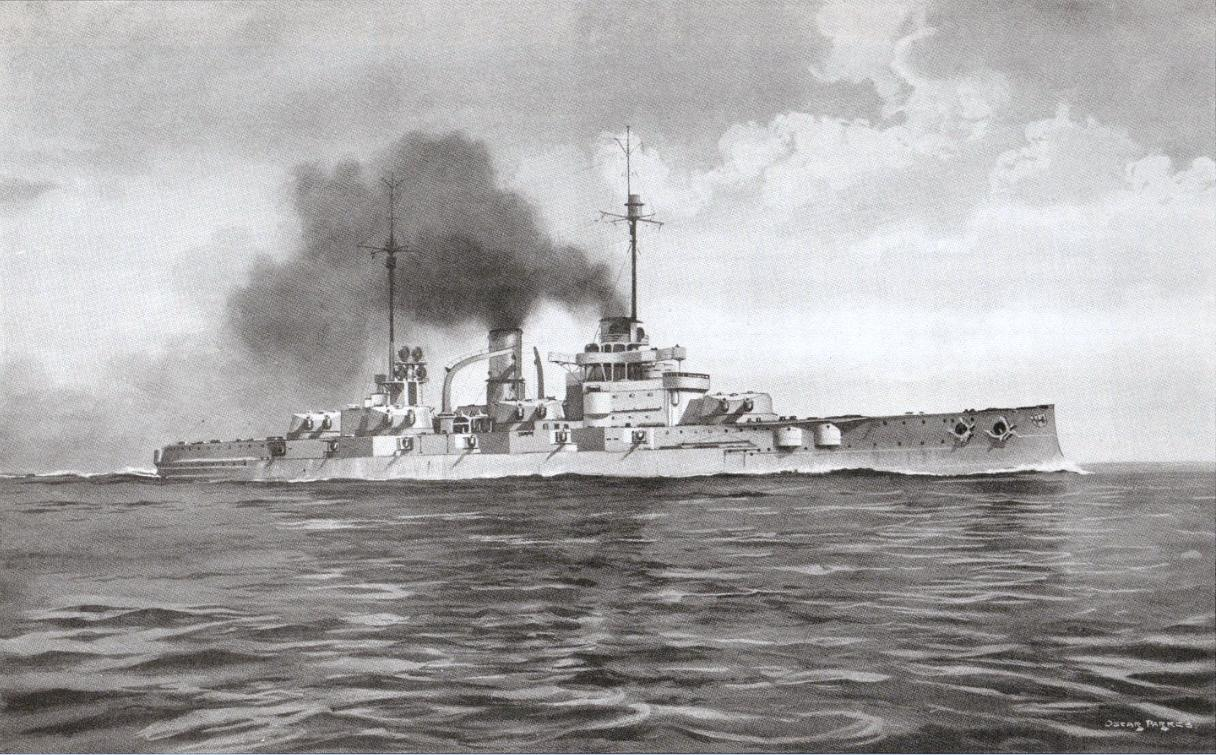
A recognition drawing of a Nassau-class battleship

In February 1918, the German navy decided to send an expedition to Finland to support German army units to be deployed there. The Finns were engaged in a civil war; the White Finns sought a conservative government free from the influence of the newly created Soviet Union, while the Red Guards preferred Soviet-style communism. On 23 February, two of Posen's sister ships—Westfalen and Rheinland—were assigned as the core of the Sonderverband Ostsee (Special Unit Baltic Sea), under the command of Konteradmiral Hugo Meurer. The two ships embarked the 14th Jäger Battalion. They departed for Åland on the following morning. Åland was to be a forward operating base, from which the port of Hanko would be secured. From Hanko, the German expedition would assault the capital of Helsingfors. The task force reached the Åland Islands on 5 March, where they encountered the Swedish coastal defense ships HSwMS Sverige, Thor, and Oscar II. Negotiations ensued, which resulted in the landing of the German troops on Åland on 7 March; Westfalen then returned to Danzig, where Posen was stationed.

By that time, the Sonderverband had been reinforced by the coastal defense ship Beowulf, the light cruiser Kolberg, and several more auxiliaries. Not long before, Germany and Russia had signed the Treaty of Brest-Litovsk, ending the fighting between the two countries. Posen remained in Danzig until 31 March, when she departed for Finland with Westfalen; the ships arrived at Russarö, which was the outer defense for Hanko, by 3 April. The fortress at Russarö was still under Russian control, and the garrison declared their neutrality, which allowed the Germans to go ashore without fighting. The German army quickly took the port, and the British submarines that had been based there were all scuttled by their crews. On 5 April, Meuer secured an agreement with the local Russian naval commander that his ships would not interfere in the German operations.

Helsingfors was the next major objective; Posen had sailed south to Reval to make preparations for the attack on the Finnish capital. The ship got underway on 11 April, and the following day, she and Westfalen passed the fortifications guarding Helsingfors, and they were soon joined by Beowulf. The German ships sent men ashore to take control of the harbor and the Skatudden district, while the Baltic Division attacked the city from the land side. Posen and the other ships provided fire support while the German and White forces fought their way across the city. Four men from the Posen's landing party were killed in the fighting and another twelve were wounded, but by 14 April, the Germans and White forces had taken control of Helsingfors. From 18 to 20 April, Posen was sent to try to free Rheinland after the latter vessel had run aground. Two days later, Posen struck a sunken wreck in Helsingfors harbor, which caused minor damage. Posen remained in Helsingfors until 30 April, by which time the White government had been installed firmly in power. Upon leaving the city, Meuer handed control of the harbor facilities over to the White government. On 30 April the ship was detached from the Sonderverband Ostsee. Posen returned to Germany, reaching Kiel by 3 May, where she entered drydock. Repair work lasted until 5 May.

==== End of the war and fate ====
On 11 August 1918, Posen, Westfalen, Kaiser, and Kaiserin sortied from Wilhelmshaven to support torpedo boats on patrol off Terschelling. On 2 October, Posen moved out into the outer roadsteads of the Jade to provide cover for the returning U-boats of the Flanders Flotilla. Posen was to have taken part in the last fleet operation of the war, planned for 30 October. The operation, scheduled just days before the armistice, envisioned the bulk of the High Seas Fleet sortieing from their base in Wilhelmshaven to engage the British Grand Fleet. In order to retain a better bargaining position for Germany, Admirals Hipper and Scheer intended to inflict as much damage as possible on the British navy, whatever the cost to the fleet. Consequently, on 29 October 1918, the order was given to depart from Wilhelmshaven to consolidate the fleet in the Jade roadstead, with the intention of departing the following morning. However, starting on the night of 29 October, sailors on Thüringen mutinied. The unrest spread to other battleships, which forced Hipper and Scheer to cancel the operation and order the battleships dispersed in an attempt to suppress the mutiny. Posen and the other ships of I Battle Squadron were sent out into the roadstead on 3 November, then returned to Wilhelmshaven on 6 November. On 9 November, Posen sailed from Brunsbüttel to Wilhelmshaven, arriving there the following day.

On 11 November 1918, the armistice took effect; according to its terms, eleven battleships and five battlecruisers were to be interned in Scapa Flow for the duration of negotiations for the peace treaty. Posen was not among the ships interned, and she was instead decommissioned on 16 December. They had their guns disabled, along with the four Helgoland-class battleships. Under the terms of the Treaty of Versailles that formally ended the war in June 1919, Posen and the other dreadnoughts that had remained in Germany were to be surrendered to the Allies under Article 185. Negotiations between the Allies over which country received what vessels, and what those ships could be used for began in November. On 5 November, Posen was stricken from the German navy list in preparation to be handed over. While final decisions were still being made, the Allies decided that the ships in question were to sail to either a British or French port, and accordingly, on 8 May 1920, Posen, Oldenburg, and the torpedo boat V71 sailed for Rosyth, Britain, arriving on 12 May. On 1 November 1920, she was driven ashore at Hawkcraig, Fife, Scotland.

The ship was still in British hands by mid-1921, though she was due to be completely scrapped by November that year. The timeline was impossible for any shipyard to keep, and so the government was forced to seek an exception from the other Allied powers to extend the deadline. The government initially sold the ship to Thos. W. Ward on 27 July, but the transaction was cancelled and she was resold to a Dutch firm on 31 August. Posen was taken to Rotterdam, the Netherlands, on 8 October, before being scrapped in Dordrecht the following year.
