= Battle of the Gulf of Riga =

World War I naval operation

Coordinates: 57.7500°N 23.5000°E

- Part of World War I
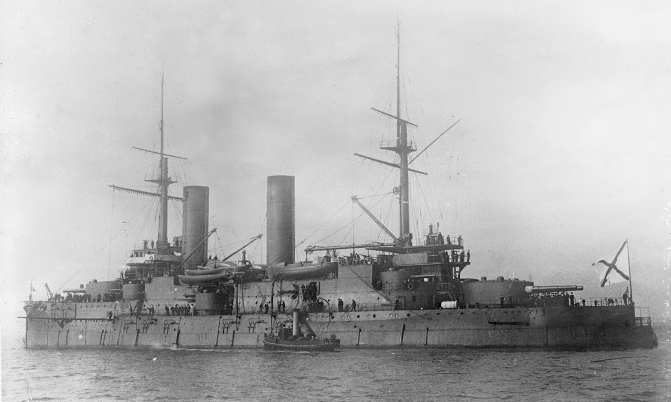
- Russian battleship Slava, circa 1915
Date	8–20 August 1915
Location	Gulf of Riga, Baltic Sea
Result	Entente victory

Belligerents
Russian Empire; Imperial Navy; United Kingdom; Royal Navy	Germany; Imperial Navy

Commanders and leaders
Vasily Kanin	Franz von Hipper

Strength
1 battleship 1 armoured cruiser 16 destroyers 4 gunboats 1 minelayer 6 submarines	4 battleships 3 battlecruisers 2 armoured cruisers 4 light cruisers 56 torpedo boats 14 minesweepers

Casualties and losses
150 killed, wounded and captured 2 gunboats sunk 1 battleship damaged 1 destroyer damaged	65 killed and wounded 1 destroyer sunk 1 torpedo boat sunk 3 minesweepers sunk 1 battlecruiser damaged

The Battle of the Gulf of Riga was a World War I naval operation of the German High Seas Fleet against the Russian Baltic Fleet in the Gulf of Riga in the Baltic Sea in August 1915. The operation's objective was to destroy the Russian naval forces in the Gulf in preparation for landing German troops to facilitate the fall of Riga in the later stages of the Central Powers' offensive on the Eastern Front in 1915. The German fleet, however, failed to achieve its objective and was forced to return to its bases; Riga remained in Russian hands until it fell to the German Army on 1 September 1917.

== Prelude ==
In early August 1915, several powerful units of the German High Seas Fleet were transferred to the Baltic to participate in the foray into the Riga Gulf. The intention was to destroy the Russian naval forces in the area, including the pre-dreadnought battleship Slava, and to use the minelayer Deutschland to block the entrance to Moon Sound with mines. The German naval forces, under the command of Vice Admiral Franz von Hipper, included the four Nassau-class and four Helgoland-class battleships, the battlecruisers SMS Moltke, Von der Tann, and Seydlitz, and a number of smaller craft.

== Battle ==
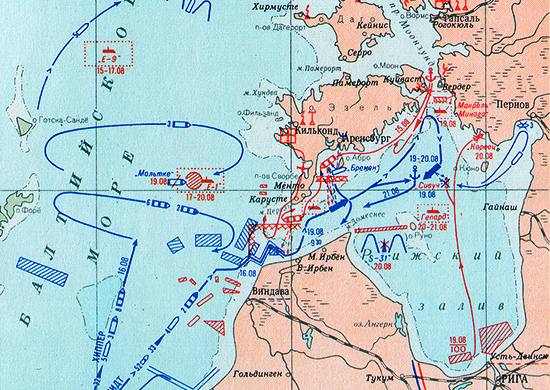
War theater in the Gulf of Riga 3 (16) - 8 (21) August 1915 Scheme

On 8 August, the first attempt to clear the gulf was made; the old pre-dreadnought battleships SMS Braunschweig and Elsass kept Slava at bay while minesweepers cleared a path through the inner belt of mines. During this period, the rest of the German fleet remained in the Baltic and provided protection against other units of the Russian fleet. However, the approach of nightfall meant that Deutschland would be unable to mine the entrance to the Suur Strait in time, and so the operation was broken off.

In the meantime, the German armored cruisers SMS Roon and Prinz Heinrich were detached to shell the Russian positions on the Sõrve Peninsula in the south of the island of Saaremaa. Several Russian destroyers were anchored off Sõrve, and one was slightly damaged during the bombardment. The battlecruiser Von der Tann and the light cruiser SMS Kolberg were sent to shell the island of Utö.

On 16 August, a second attempt was made to enter the gulf. The dreadnoughts SMS Nassau and Posen, four light cruisers, and 31 torpedo boats breached the defenses to the gulf. On the first day of the assault, the German minesweeper T46 was sunk, as was the destroyer V99. On 17 August, Nassau and Posen engaged in an artillery duel with Slava, resulting in three hits on the Russian ship that prompted her withdrawal. After three days, the Russian minefields had been cleared, and the flotilla entered the gulf on 19 August, but reports of Allied submarines in the area prompted a German withdrawal from the gulf the following day.

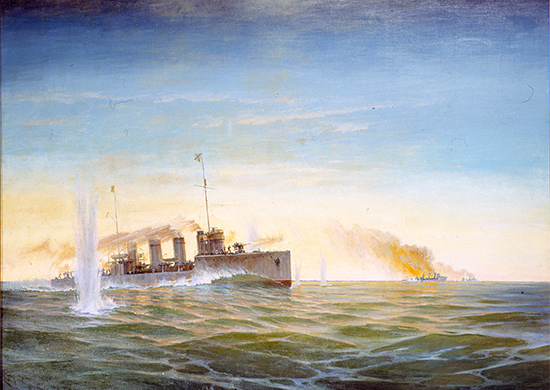
The battle of the destroyer Novik with the German destroyers V-99 and V-100 in the Gulf of Riga on 4 (17) August 1915. Artist G.V. Gorshkov

Throughout the operation, the German battlecruisers remained in the Baltic and provided cover for the assault into the Gulf of Riga. On the morning of 19 August, Moltke was torpedoed by the British E-class submarine HMS E1; the torpedo was not spotted until it was approximately 200 yd (180 m) away. Without time to manoeuver, the ship was struck in the bow torpedo room. The explosion damaged several torpedoes in the ship, but they did not detonate themselves. Eight men were killed, and 435 t (480 short tons) of water entered the ship. The ship was repaired at Blohm & Voss in Hamburg, between 23 August and 20 September.

Four large, flat-bottomed barges loaded with German troops attempted to land at Pernau on 20 August, but were repelled by small Russian warships. The Russian gunboat Sivuch was destroyed in an engagement with the German light cruiser Augsburg and eight destroyers.

== Order of battle ==
=== Russia ===
- Battleship: Slava
- Cruiser: Rurik
- Gunboats: Grozyashchiy, Khrabry, Sivuch, Korietz
- Minelayer: Amur
- Flotilla of 16 destroyers
- Submarines: Kaiman, Krokodil, Makrel, Okun, Minoga

=== Germany ===
- Battleships: SMS Nassau, SMS Posen, SMS Braunschweig, SMS Elsass
- Battlecruisers: SMS Moltke, SMS Seydlitz, SMS Von der Tann
- Cruisers: SMS Augsburg, SMS Bremen, SMS Graudenz, SMS Pillau, SMS Roon, SMS Prinz Heinrich
- Minelayer: SMS Albatross
- Flotilla of 56 destroyers
