= SMS Graudenz =

Light cruiser of the German Imperial Navy

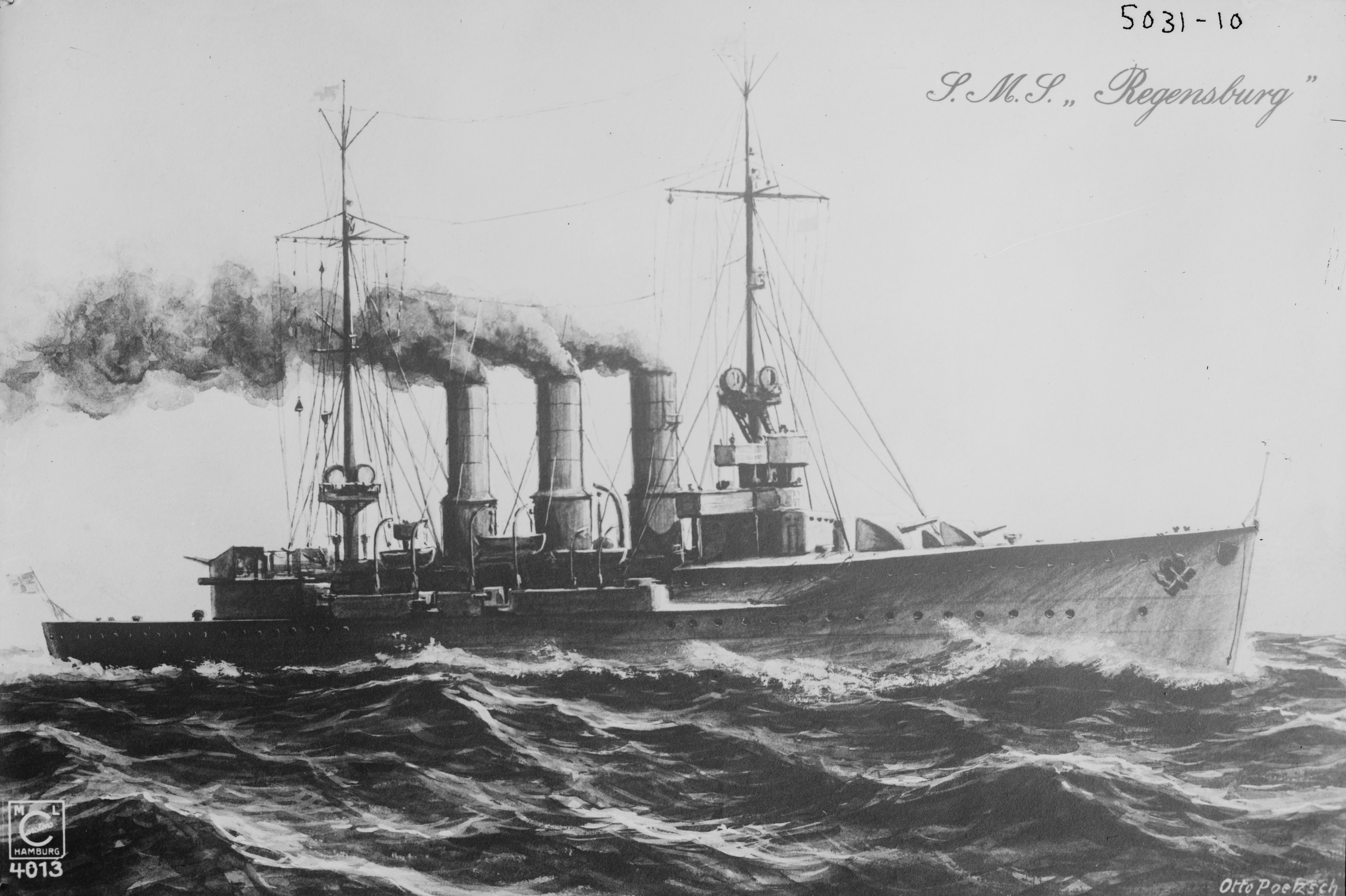
- Postcard depicting a sketch of Graudenz's sister ship SMS Regensburg

History

German Empire
- Name: Graudenz
- Namesake: City of Graudenz
- Builder: Kiel Navy Yard
- Laid down: 23 October 1912
- Launched: 25 October 1913
- Commissioned: 10 August 1914
- Stricken: 10 March 1920
- Fate: Ceded to Italy in 1920

Kingdom of Italy
- Name: Ancona
- Namesake: City of Ancona
- Acquired: 1 June 1920
- Decommissioned: August 1932
- Stricken: 11 March 1937
- Fate: Scrapped

General characteristics
- Class & type: Graudenz-class cruiser
- Displacement: Normal: 4,912 t (4,834 long tons); Full load: 6,382 t (6,281 long tons)
- Length: 142.70 m (468 ft 2 in)
- Beam: 13.80 m (45 ft 3 in)
- Draft: 5.75 m (18 ft 10 in)
- Installed power: 12 × water-tube boilers; 26,000 shp (19,000 kW)
- Propulsion: 2 × steam turbines; 2 × screw propellers
- Speed: 27.5 kn (50.9 km/h; 31.6 mph)
- Range: 5,500 nmi (10,200 km; 6,300 mi) at 12 knots (22 km/h; 14 mph)
- Crew: 21 officer; 364 enlisted men
- Armament: As built: 12 × 10.5 cm (4.1 in) SK L/45 guns; 2 × 50 cm torpedo tubes; After refit: 7 × 15 cm SK L/45 guns; 2 × 8.8 cm (3.5 in) SK L/45 anti-aircraft guns; 4 × 50 cm torpedo tubes; 120 mines
- Armor: Belt: 60 mm (2.4 in); Deck: 60 mm; Conning tower: 100 mm (3.9 in)

SMS Graudenz was the lead ship of her class of light cruisers. She had one sister ship, SMS Regensburg. The ship was built by the German Kaiserliche Marine (Imperial Navy) in the Kaiserliche Werft shipyard in Kiel, laid down in 1912 and commissioned into the High Seas Fleet in August 1914, days after the outbreak of World War I. She was named for the then-German town of Graudenz (now Grudziądz, Poland). The ship was armed with a main battery of twelve 10.5 cm SK L/45 guns and had a top speed of 27.5 knots (50.9 km/h; 31.6 mph).

Graudenz saw extensive service during World War I, including serving as part of the reconnaissance screen for the battlecruisers of the I Scouting Group during the raid on Scarborough, Hartlepool and Whitby in December 1914. The ship also took part in the Battle of Dogger Bank in January 1915, and the Battle of the Gulf of Riga in August 1915. She had been damaged by a mine and was unable to participate in the Battle of Jutland in May 1916. She was assigned to the planned final operation of the High Seas Fleet in October 1918, weeks before the end of the war, but a major mutiny forced the cancellation of the plan. After the end of the war, the ship was ceded to Italy as a war prize and commissioned into the Italian Navy as Ancona; she remained in service until 1937 when she was stricken and broken up for scrap.

== Design ==
SMS Regensburg in her configuration of 1918; Graudenz was similar (Note: The bow shape in this drawing is incorrect, however; the Graudenz-class cruisers had a straight stem, not a ram bow.)

The two Graudenz-class cruisers were designed during the negotiations over the 1912 amendment to the Naval Law, which forced compromises to keep costs down. They were largely repeats of the preceding Karlsruhe class, with several minor changes. These included removing a pair of boilers (but retaining the same top speed), taller masts (to allow the ships to serve as flotilla leaders), and the introduction of a superfiring arrangement of the aft guns.

Graudenz was 142.7 meters (468 ft) long overall and had a beam of 13.8 m (45 ft) and a draft of 5.75 m (18.9 ft) forward. She displaced 6,382 t (6,281 long tons) at full load. The ship had a fairly small superstructure that consisted of a conning tower. Her hull had a long forecastle that extended for the first third of the ship, stepping down to main deck level just aft of the conning tower. She was fitted with a pair of pole masts that were taller than standard masts, which allowed them to be used to send wireless telegraph signals, a requirement of their use as flotilla leaders. The ship had a crew of 21 officers and 364 enlisted men.

Her propulsion system consisted of two sets of Marine steam turbines driving two 3.5-meter (11 ft) propellers. They were rated to provide 26,000 shaft horsepower (19,000 kW). These were powered by ten coal-fired Marine-type water-tube boilers and two oil-fired double-ended boilers, which were vented through three funnels located amidships. These gave the ship a top speed of 27.5 knots (50.9 km/h; 31.6 mph). Graudenz carried 1,280 t (1,260 long tons) of coal, and an additional 375 t (369 long tons) of oil that gave her a range of approximately 5,500 nautical miles (10,200 km; 6,300 mi) at 12 knots (22 km/h; 14 mph).

The ship was armed with twelve 10.5 cm (4.1 in) SK L/45 guns in single pedestal mounts. Two were placed side by side forward on the forecastle, eight were located amidships, four on either side, and two in a superfiring pair aft. The guns had a maximum elevation of 30 degrees, which allowed them to engage targets out to 12,700 m (41,700 ft). These were later replaced with seven 15 cm (5.9 in) SK L/45 guns and two 8.8 cm (3.5 in) SK L/45 anti-aircraft guns. She was also equipped with a pair of 50 cm (19.7 in) torpedo tubes with five torpedoes submerged in the hull on the broadside. Two deck-mounted launchers were added when the gun armament was upgraded. She could also carry 120 mines.

The ship was protected by a waterline armor belt that was 60 mm (2.4 in) thick amidships. Protection for the ship's internals was reinforced with a curved armor deck that was 60 mm thick; the deck sloped downward at the sides and connected to the bottom edge of the belt armor. The conning tower had 100 mm (3.9 in) thick sides.

== Service history ==
Graudenz was ordered in April 1912 under the contract name "Ersatz Prinzess Wilhelm", (Note: German warships were ordered under provisional names. Additions to the fleet were given a single letter; ships intended to replace older or lost vessels were ordered as "Ersatz (name of the ship to be replaced)".) and was laid down at the Kaiserliche Werft shipyard in Kiel on 23 October 1912. She was launched on 25 October 1913. At her launching, the mayor of Graudenz, Dr. Kühnast, christened the ship. The navy planned to commission the ship in the fall of 1914, but the outbreak of World War I at the end of July 1914 led to a rushed completion. She was commissioned on 10 August 1914, and Kapitän zur See (KzS—Captain at Sea) Karl von Restorff temporarily left his position in the Naval Cabinet to oversee sea trials of the new cruiser.

Completion of the trials were delayed by faulty engine components that had to be replaced, and the heavy workload of the shipyard, owing to the start of the war. Restorff rushed the ship through initial testing, completing only the bare minimum requirements, including speed tests that were carried out haphazardly, using dead reckoning and in very shallow water. According to the historians Dodson and Nottelmann, due to these conditions, the results of the trials, during which the ship reached a top speed of 27.3 knots (50.6 km/h; 31.4 mph), "cannot be regarded as of any great significance". Nevertheless, on 6 September, the ship was pronounced ready for active service. Two days later, Fregattenkapitän (FK—Frigate Captain) Theodor Püllen took command of the ship. Restorff became the II Commander of Torpedo Boats, and he used Graudenz as his flagship for the first three months of his command.

=== World War I ===
==== 1914 ====
On 10 September, Graudenz was stationed in the German Bight for local defensive patrols. From 20 to 26 September, she moved to the Baltic Sea for a sweep into the eastern Baltic in an unsuccessful attempt to locate Russian forces. She thereafter returned to the North Sea and saw no major action through the following month. Graudenz's first operation in the North Sea was the raid on Yarmouth on 3 November 1914. She formed part of the reconnaissance screen for the battlecruisers of Konteradmiral (Rear Admiral) Franz von Hipper's I Scouting Group, along with the cruisers Kolberg and Strassburg. During the operation, Graudenz briefly engaged the British torpedo gunboat HMS Halcyon, but neither vessel was hit. The bombardment was conducted without incident, but on the return, the armored cruiser Yorck struck a German mine outside Wilhelmshaven and sank. Graudenz and several other vessels from the High Seas Fleet were transferred temporarily to the Baltic again, from 7 to 17 November. They were to carry out a bombardment of Russian positions at Libau, but it was cancelled and the ships returned to the North Sea. Restorff transferred his flag to the cruiser Stettin on 27 November.

She was also present for the raid on Scarborough, Hartlepool and Whitby on 15–16 December 1914, which was again led by the battlecruisers of I Scouting Group. The main body of the High Seas Fleet again steamed at a distance to provide support, but after briefly clashing with the British 2nd Battle Squadron in the night, the German fleet commander (Admiral Friedrich von Ingenohl) withdrew without inform Hipper. After completing the bombardment of the towns, the Germans began to withdraw, though British forces moved to intercept them. Graudenz, Stralsund, Strassburg, and two flotillas of torpedo boats steamed between two British squadrons. In the heavy mist, which reduced visibility to less than 4,000 yd (3,700 m), only Stralsund was spotted, though the two sides engaged each other only briefly. The Germans were able to use the bad weather to cover their withdrawal. Graudenz was not damaged in the short action.

On 25 December, British seaplanes raided the zeppelin base at Nordholz. The aircraft also passed over the mouth of the Weser, where Graudenz and several other vessels were anchored. The planes attempted to bomb Graudenz and Stralsund, but none of their attacks succeeded; the closest was a bomb that fell some 200 m (660 ft) away from Graudenz. At around the same time, the command structure of the fleet's scouting forces was reorganized, and Graudenz became the flagship of KAdm Georg Hebbinghaus on 26 December. Hebbinghaus was the commander of II Scouting Group, where Graudenz was now assigned. The cruiser Rostock took over her previous duties as the flagship of the I Commander of Torpedo-boats. At that time, the unit also included Strassburg, Stralsund, Kolberg, and Rostock.

==== 1915 ====
Map of the North Sea

Graudenz and three of the cruisers—Kolberg was under repair at the time—sortied on 3 January 1915 for a sweep to the west of Amrun Bank that failed to locate any British forces by the time they returned to port the following day. Graudenz again screened for I Scouting Group for the sortie out to the Dogger Bank on 24 January 1915. In the ensuing Battle of Dogger Bank, the large armored cruiser Blücher was sunk. Graudenz was not engaged in the battle. The ship was dry docked from 17 February to 2 March for periodic maintenance. The ship moved to the Baltic again for a short operation from 17 to 28 March, during which she bombarded Russian positions at Polangen, north of Memel in East Prussia. After returning to the North Sea, Graudenz participated in the first major fleet operation under its new commander, Admiral Hugo von Pohl, on 29 March. Graudenz thereafter moved back to the Baltic for training exercises from 30 March to 8 April. After returning to the German Bight, Graudenz took part in a minelaying operation off the Swarte Bank on 17–18 April. The cruisers Stralsund and Strassburg laid the minefield, while Graudenz, Rostock, the cruiser Pillau, and several torpedo-boats provided cover.

On 21 April, Graudenz joined the High Seas Fleet for a sweep into the North Sea that concluded the following day without encountering enemy forces. The ships of II Scouting Group laid another minefield on 17–18 May off the Dogger Bank; Stralsund and Strassburg again laid the mines, while Graudenz and the rest of the unit escorted them. The High Seas Fleet also sortied during the operation to provide distant support, but no British ships intervened. Graudenz and the rest of the group covered several sperrbrecher minesweepers as they cleared a minefield laid by British vessels north of Borkum on 25–26 May. Another fleet operation took place on 29–30 May, again without encountering British ships. In June, II Scouting Group moved to the Baltic for training, and at the end of the month, they carried out a patrol to inspect fishing boats off Terschelling. Another such patrol took place in early July off Horns Rev.

In August 1915, Graudenz went into the Baltic for a major operation to clear the Gulf of Riga of Russian naval forces; the operation lasted from 2 to 29 August. Eight dreadnoughts and three battlecruisers from the High Seas Fleet were detached for the operation. During the first attempt to penetrate the Gulf of Riga, Graudenz and the rest of I Scouting Group formed part of the covering group that was to prevent any Russian attempt to counter-attack from further east in the Baltic. Graudenz directly participated in the second attack on 16 August, led by the dreadnoughts Nassau and Posen. The minesweepers cleared the Russian minefields by the 20th, allowing the German squadron to enter the Gulf. That day, Graudenz covered the sinking of three blockships in the harbor at Pernau. The Russians had by this time withdrawn to Moon Sound, and the threat of Russian submarines and mines in the Gulf prompted the Germans to retreat. The major units of the High Seas Fleet were back in the North Sea before the end of August. Shortly after arriving in Kiel on 28 August, Graudenz took KAdm Friedrich Boedicker aboard; he replaced Hebbinghaus as the group commander.

Graudenz and Pillau were sent out on 8 September to aid the torpedo-boats V1 and G12, which had accidentally collided off Horns Rev. The latter vessel had exploded and sank, killing forty-seven of her crew. On 11–12 September, the ships of II Scouting Group carried out another minelaying operation off the Swarte Bank. As in previous such operations, Stralsund and Strassburg laid the mines while the other ships provided cover. For this operation, I Scouting Group and the main body of the High Seas Fleet also sortied to cover the ships. In October, Graudenz was scheduled to go into dock to be rearmed, so on 14 October, Boedicker transferred his flag to Regensburg. But a major fleet operation on 23–24 October delayed the plans, and Graudenz went to sea with the fleet, which sailed in the direction of Esbjerg, Denmark. On the way back, Graudenz was detached to proceed to Kiel, where the rearmament work was carried out from 26 October until 18 February 1916.

==== 1916–1918 ====
Graudenz returned to active service in the North Sea on 19 February. The following day, Boedicker shifted his flag back to the ship. She went to sea again for a fleet operation that lasted from 5 to 7 March; by this time, Pohl had been replaced by Vizeadmiral (Vice Admiral) Reinhard Scheer. On 25 March, British seaplane tenders launched an air raid on the zeppelin base at Tondern, and Graudenz led a sortie by II Scouting Group to try to catch the carriers before they withdrew. They returned to port the following day having failed to locate the British ships. On 28 March, Boedicker temporarily replaced Hipper as the commander of I Scouting Group, and KzS Ludwig von Reuter took temporary command of II Scouting Group aboard Graudenz. The ships took part in a fleet sweep toward Horns Rev on 21–22 April. While on the way back, at around 00:25 on 22 April, Graudenz struck a mine to the southwest of the Amrun Bank lightvessel. The mine inflicted significant damage and she was left immobilized. Reuter transferred to Pillau, and the torpedo boat S51 took Graudenz under tow, though the cruiser Frauenlob took up the tow line for the voyage back to Wilhelmshaven. She was dry docked for extensive repairs, and as a result, was not available for the fleet operation that resulted in the Battle of Jutland on 31 May − 1 June.

On 13 September, Graudenz was finally ready to return to service. She resumed her role as flagship of II Scouting Group, though by this time the commander was KzS and Kommodore Andreas Michelsen. Michelsen did not come aboard the ship until 5 October, however. She went to sea on 18 October during the operation that led to a brief action the following day, an inconclusive sweep during which a British submarine torpedoed the cruiser München. The failure of the operation (coupled with the action of 19 August 1916) convinced the German naval command to abandon its aggressive fleet strategy. Graudenz nevertheless sortied on 22 October in company with I Battle Squadron, the battlecruisers Von der Tann and Moltke. Two days later, she accompanied a torpedo-boat patrol in the western North Sea. During this period, from 18 October until 3 November, Michelsen was briefly send to Flanders, and FK Madlung, Graudenz's captain, temporarily filled his role as I Commander of Torpedo-boats.

On 4 January 1917, Graudenz moved to the Baltic for training maneuvers that lasted until 16 January. She took part in a sweep toward the Hoofden on 29–30 January. She led elements of II and VIII Torpedo-boat Flotilla and the 18th Half-Flotilla for another patrol to the Hoofden. The rest of 1917 was spent carrying out local defensive patrols in the German Bight, interrupted only by training periods in the Baltic from 21 to 31 March and 28 July to 9 August. On 6 June, Michelsen left his post and Kommodore Paul Heinrich replaced him, though he remained aboard his old flagship, the new cruiser Emden. KzS Hans Eberius, the II Commander of Torpedo-boats, came aboard Graudenz as his new flagship; she held this position until the end of the war. Graudenz went to sea next on 10–13 March 1918, in company with Emden, the light cruisers Frankfurt and Bremse, and seventeen torpedo-boats. The ships carried out a patrol for foreign shipping in the Skagerrak and Kattegat, between Denmark and Norway, and they captured seven vessels. After stopping in Kiel, they passed through the Kaiser Wilhelm Canal and returned to the North Sea. Graudenz covered another such raid on 13 April, which was carried out by the vessels of II Torpedo-boat Flotilla, and advanced as far north as Hanstholm, Denmark.

German attacks on shipping between Britain and Norway, which had begun in late 1917, prompted the Grand Fleet to begin escorting convoys with a detached battle squadron. This decision presented the Germans with opportunity for which they had been waiting the entire war: a portion of the numerically stronger Grand Fleet was separated and could be isolated and destroyed. Hipper planned the operation: I Scouting Group, along with light cruisers and destroyers, would attack one of the large convoys while the rest of the High Seas Fleet would stand by, ready to attack the British battle squadron when it intervened. At 05:00 on 23 April 1918, the German fleet—including Graudenz—departed from the Schillig roadstead. Hipper, aboard the battleship Baden, ordered wireless transmissions be kept to a minimum, to prevent radio intercepts by British intelligence. During the voyage north, Moltke suffered a machinery breakdown, and she had to be towed back to port. Despite this setback, Hipper continued northward. By 14:00, Hipper's force had crossed the convoy route several times but had found nothing. At 14:10, Hipper turned his ships southward. By 18:37, the German fleet had made it back to the defensive minefields surrounding their bases. While at sea, Graudenz was attacked by a British submarine, but it's torpedo missed. It was later discovered that the convoy had left port a day later than expected by the German planning staff.

On 31 July, Graudenz joined a major fleet operation to clear British minefields blocking German access to the sea. She took part in training exercises in the Baltic later that year, and from 6 September to 16 October, she was dry-docked in Wilhelmshaven for periodic maintenance. Graudenz was to participate in a final, climactic attack by the High Seas Fleet in late October. The planned operation called for raids on Allied shipping in the Thames estuary and Flanders to draw out the Grand Fleet. Graudenz, Karlsruhe and Nürnberg were assigned to the force tasked with attacking Flanders. On the morning of 29 October 1918, the order was given to sail from Wilhelmshaven the following day. Starting on the night of 29 October, sailors on Thüringen and then on several other battleships mutinied. The unrest ultimately forced Hipper and Scheer to cancel the operation. Michelsen organized a force of light craft, including light cruisers, destroyers, and U-boats to oppose a possible British attack while the heavy units of the fleet were in disarray; he chose Graudenz as his flagship. On 9 November, Graudenz sortied in response to reports of British warships in the German Bight, but these turned out to be false.

=== Postwar operations ===
Following Germany's surrender with the Armistice of 11 November 1918, Graudenz remained in active service in German waters, unlike most other vessels, which were either interned in Scapa Flow or were disarmed and laid up in German ports. Even as the German revolution spread from the initial mutiny in Wilhelmshaven, Graudenz's crew remained loyal to the naval command structure. During this period, the ship's commander, KK Friedrich Beesel, became the II Commander of Torpedo-boats. Soon after the end of the war, most of the existing naval commands were abolished, and on 10 January 1919, the North Sea Naval Station subordinated the only remaining structure, the Befehlshaber der Sicherung der Nordsee (BSN— Commander for the Security of the North Sea). Graudenz was assigned to the BSN, which was based aboard the old pre-dreadnought battleship Kaiser Wilhelm II, which was used as a stationary headquarters ship. The unit also included Regensburg and the cruiser Königsberg and the torpedo-boats T96 and T98. Of these vessels, only Graudenz and Regensburg were permitted to keep their guns aboard.

The ship's activities in the immediate post-war period are unclear, as few records from that time have survived. On 2 January 1919, the ship sailed from Wilhelmshaven to aid the torpedo-boat T190, which was in distress. And according to a letter written by VAdm Adolf von Trotha, the Chief of the Vorläufige Reichsmarine (Provisional Reich Navy), he took a trip aboard the ship that year. On 20 February, Graudenz towed the U-boats U-21, U-25, U-38, U-71, U-118, U-136, U-140, UC-40, and UC-60 to internment in Britain. The U-boats were in poor condition, and U-21 and UC-40 foundered while on the way to Britain. In June, the ship's final German captain, Korvettenkapitän (Corvette Captain) Bernhard Bobsien, took command. After the scuttling of the German fleet at Scapa Flow also in June, the Allies demanded that Graudenz and other ships still in Germany be handed over as replacements. The Germans suggested they would instead complete five of the Cöln-class cruisers that had been under construction to replace the vessels sunk at Scapa Flow, which would have allowed them to keep Graudenz and four other more modern vessels. The French initially wanted to agree to the trade, but it was ultimately prohibited by another term of the Versailles Treaty, which required the demolition of all vessels building in Germany. In the meantime, the ship was scheduled to be struck from the naval register on 5 November to comply with the Allied demands, but coal shortages and other issues delayed her decommissioning until 10 March 1920, at which point she was removed from the register.

=== Italian service ===
Graudenz was thereafter surrendered to the Allies as a war prize. She sailed to Cherbourg, France, on 28 May 1920 and arrived on 1 June. She was transferred to Italy on 1 June 1920 under the name "E" in the French port of Cherbourg. She was placed in Italian service and renamed Ancona. She was overhauled starting in 1921 through 1924, during which she was partially re-boilered with six oil-fired models, and the remaining six boilers were modified to allow coal or oil burning. Her coal storage space was reduced from 1,280 t (1,260 long tons; 1,410 short tons) to 900 metric tons (890 long tons; 990 short tons) and her oil bunker capacity was correspondingly increased from 375 t (369 long tons; 413 short tons) to 1,520 t (1,500 long tons; 1,680 short tons). She also had her superfiring 15 cm gun moved amidships, but in 1926 it was moved back to clear room for a platform to hold a scout plane. She initially carried a Macchi M.7, which was later replaced by a CANT 25AR.

Ancona was commissioned into the Italian Navy on 6 May 1925. She was modified extensively in 1928–1929, during which a fixed aircraft catapult was installed in the bow. The modifications required a longer bow to fit the catapult, so a longer clipper bow was installed. This was to test the utility of a fixed catapult on the bow, an arrangement that would later be used in the Trento and Zara classes of heavy cruisers built in the 1920s and 1930s. Ancona joined the other two ex-German cruisers, Bari and Taranto and the ex-German destroyer Premuda as the Scout Division of the 1st Squadron, based in La Spezia in 1929. The Italians had trouble maintaining the ex-German ships, however, and Ancona was not in particularly good condition, so she was laid up in Taranto after her last cruise in August 1932.

Ancona thereafter served as a source of spare parts for Bari and Taranto. The navy considered rebuilding Ancona for service in the Italian colonial empire in early 1936, as Bari and Taranto had been. She was to have had her after boilers removed and the remaining boilers replaced with new oil-fired units that would have been ducted into a single large funnel. A trio of 76 mm (3 in) 40-caliber (cal.) anti-aircraft guns were to have been installed. The plan came to nothing due to the cost of the reconstruction, and in April another proposal to convert her into an anti-aircraft floating battery was considered. She would have had six of her boilers removed, giving her a top speed of 21 knots (39 km/h; 24 mph), and her aft superstructure was to have been removed. This would have provided space for twenty-six 100 mm (3.9 in) 47-cal. guns in twin mounts and a fire-control director. The cost of the conversion proved to be excessive, as did a third option that would have seen her receive a new propulsion system for use as an escort vessel. As the ship had no further use, she was stricken from the naval register on 11 March 1937 and sold for scrap, being broken up in 1938.
