= SMS Stralsund =

Light cruiser of the German Imperial Navy

- Stralsund (or her sister Strassburg) at sea, in 1915 or 1916

History

German Empire
- Name: Stralsund
- Namesake: SMS Stralsund
- Builder: AG Weser, Bremen
- Laid down: 1910
- Launched: 4 November 1911
- Commissioned: 10 December 1912
- Decommissioned: 17 December 1918
- Stricken: 5 November 1919
- Fate: Ceded to France in 1920

History

France
- Name: Mulhouse
- Namesake: Mulhouse
- Acquired: 3 August 1920
- Commissioned: 3 August 1922
- Decommissioned: August 1928
- Stricken: 15 February 1933
- Fate: Broken up, 1933–1935

General characteristics
- Class & type: Magdeburg-class cruiser
- Displacement: Normal: 4,570 t (4,500 long tons); Full load: 5,587 t (5,499 long tons)
- Length: 138.7 m (455 ft 1 in)
- Beam: 13.5 m (44 ft 3 in)
- Draft: 4.46 m (14 ft 8 in)
- Installed power: 16 × water-tube boilers; 25,000 shp (19,000 kW)
- Propulsion: 3 × steam turbines; 3 × screw propellers
- Speed: 27.5 knots (50.9 km/h; 31.6 mph)
- Range: 5,820 nmi (10,780 km; 6,700 mi) at 12 knots (22 km/h; 14 mph)
- Complement: 18 officers; 336 enlisted
- Armament: 12 × 10.5 cm (4.1 in) SK L/45 guns; 120 × mines; 2 × 50 cm (19.7 in) torpedo tubes
- Armor: Belt: 60 mm (2.4 in); Deck: 60 mm; Conning tower: 100 mm (3.9 in)

SMS Stralsund was a Magdeburg-class light cruiser of the German Kaiserliche Marine. Her class included three other ships: Magdeburg, Breslau, and Strassburg. She was built at the AG Weser shipyard in Bremen from 1910 to December 1912, when she was commissioned into the High Seas Fleet. The ship was armed with a main battery of twelve 10.5 cm SK L/45 guns and had a top speed of 27.5 knots (50.9 km/h; 31.6 mph).

Stralsund was assigned to the reconnaissance forces of the High Seas Fleet for the majority of her career. She saw significant action in the early years of World War I, including several operations off the British coast and the Battles of Heligoland Bight and Dogger Bank, in August 1914 and November 1915, respectively. She was not damaged in either action. The ship was in dockyard hands during the Battle of Jutland, and so she missed the engagement. After the end of the war, she served briefly in the Reichsmarine before being surrendered to the Allies. She was ceded to the French Navy, where she served as Mulhouse until 1925. She was formally stricken in 1933 and broken up for scrap two years later.

== Design ==
Plan and profile of the Magdeburg class

The Magdeburg-class cruisers were designed in response to the development of the British Invincible-class battlecruisers, which were faster than all existing German light cruisers. As a result, speed of the new ships had to be increased. To accomplish this, more powerful engines were fitted and their hulls were lengthened to improve their hydrodynamic efficiency. These changes increased top speed from 25.5 to 27 knots (47.2 to 50.0 km/h; 29.3 to 31.1 mph) over the preceding Kolberg-class cruisers. To save weight, longitudinal framing was adopted for the first time in a major German warship design. In addition, the Magdeburgs were the first cruisers to carry belt armor, which was necessitated by the adoption of more powerful 6-inch (150 mm) guns in the latest British cruisers.

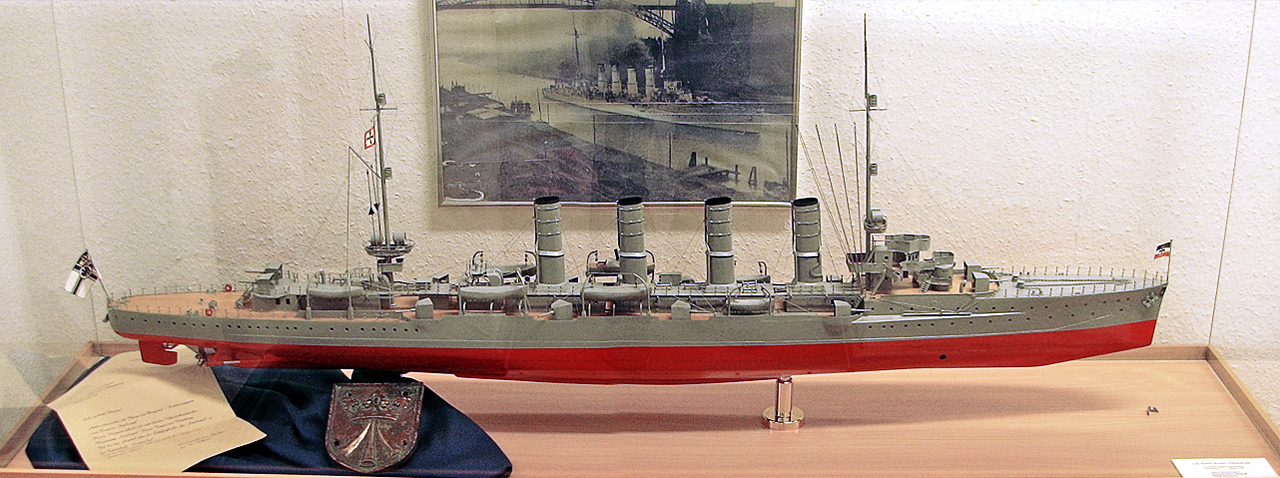
Model of a Magdeburg-class cruiser in the Marinemuseum in Dänholm

Stralsund was 138.7 meters (455 ft 1 in) long overall and had a beam of 13.5 m (44 ft 3 in) and a draft of 4.46 m (14 ft 8 in) forward. She displaced 4,570 t (4,500 long tons; 5,040 short tons) normally and up to 5,587 t (5,499 long tons) at full load. The ship had a short forecastle deck and a minimal superstructure that consisted primarily of a conning tower located on the forecastle. She was fitted with two pole masts with platforms for searchlights. Stralsund had a crew of 18 officers and 336 enlisted men.

Her propulsion system consisted of three sets of Bergmann steam turbines driving three screw propellers. These were powered by sixteen coal-fired Marine-type water-tube boilers, although they were later altered to use fuel oil that was sprayed on the coal to increase its burn rate. The boilers were vented through four funnels located amidships. They were designed to give 25,000 shaft horsepower (19,000 kW) for a top speed of 27.5 knots (50.9 km/h; 31.6 mph), but she reached 35,515 shp (26,484 kW) and a top speed of 28.2 knots (52.2 km/h; 32.5 mph) during her initial speed testing. Stralsund carried 1,200 t (1,181 long tons) of coal, and an additional 106 t (104 long tons) of oil that gave her a range of approximately 5,820 nautical miles (10,780 km; 6,700 mi) at 12 knots (22 km/h; 14 mph).

The ship was armed with a main battery of twelve 10.5 cm (4.1 in) SK L/45 guns in single pedestal mounts. Two were placed side by side forward on the forecastle, eight were located on the broadside, four on either side, and two were side by side aft. The guns had a maximum elevation of 30 degrees, which allowed them to engage targets out to 12,700 m (13,900 yd). They were supplied with 1,800 rounds of ammunition, for 150 shells per gun. She was also equipped with a pair of 50 cm (19.7 in) torpedo tubes with five torpedoes; the tubes were submerged in the hull on the broadside. She could also carry 120 mines.

Stralsund was protected by a waterline armor belt and a curved armor deck. The deck was flat across most of the hull, but angled downward at the sides and connected to the bottom edge of the belt. The belt and deck were both 60 mm (2.4 in) thick. The conning tower had 100 mm (3.9 in) thick sides.

== Service history ==
Stralsund in 1913

Stralsund was ordered under the contract name "Ersatz Cormoran", (Note: German warships were ordered under provisional names. Additions to the fleet were given a single letter; ships intended to replace older or lost vessels were ordered as "Ersatz (name of the ship to be replaced)".) and was laid down at the AG Weser shipyard in Bremen in September 1910 and launched on 4 November 1911; during the launching ceremony, the mayor of Stralsund, Ernst Gronow, gave a speech. Fitting-out work thereafter commenced. Named for the earlier schooner Stralsund, she was commissioned into active service on 10 December 1912. Fregattenkapitän (FK—Frigate Captain) Magnus von Levetzow served as her first commander, though he served only briefly in that role, before being replaced by FK Victor Harder in January 1913. After entering service, Stralsund conducted sea trials, which lasted until 15 February. The ship then joined the Unit of Reconnaissance Ships, assigned to II Scouting Group, where she took part in the peacetime routine of training exercises and cruises with the High Seas Fleet for the next year.

=== World War I ===
On 16 August, some two weeks after the outbreak of World War I, Stralsund and Strassburg were ordered to carry out a sweep into the Hoofden to search for British reconnaissance forces, in the hopes of surprising patrolling British destroyers. The operation was led by Harder aboard Stralsund. They were accompanied by the U-boats U-19 and U-24, which were to ambush any British forces that counter-attacked. The two cruisers departed late on 17 August and early the following morning, they passed through the British patrol line in darkness; at around 04:45, they reversed course with the intention surprising the British destroyers from behind. Stralsund and Strassburg steamed about 50 nmi (93 km; 58 mi) apart to increase their chances of locating British forces; at 06:39, Stralsund spotted a group of eight or ten destroyers and the light cruiser HMS Fearless at a distance of about 10,000 m (11,000 yd). The British commander aboard Fearless initially mistook Stralsund for an armored cruiser and he initially ordered his ships to refrain from attacking her. Stralsund, for her part, immediately opened fire on the nearest destroyers. After about half an hour of inaccurate shooting from both sides, German lookouts spotted what they thought was a second British cruiser approaching, so Harder decided to break off the engagement.

==== Battle of Helgoland Bight ====
The actions of Stralsund in the Battle of Heligoland Bight

In response to Stralsund's raid on the British patrol line, the British naval command decided to stage a retaliatory raid on the German defenses in the Helgoland Bight, to be carried out by the Harwich Force. This led to the Battle of Heligoland Bight on 28 August 1914. British battlecruisers and light cruisers raided the German reconnaissance screen in the Heligoland Bight. At the start of the action, Stralsund and the rest of II Scouting Group were at anchor in Wilhelmshaven, and as soon as reports of British cruisers arrived at the naval command, II Scouting Group was ordered to sea immediately. By 11:30, Stralsund had gotten underway, following Strassburg and the light cruiser Cöln.

At around 13:40, Stralsund, heard the sound of shooting in the distance, and shortly after 14:00, she encountered three British cruisers and a battlecruiser. She came under heavy fire, but suffered only a single hit that failed to explode, though shell fragments from near misses injured several crewmen. Stralsund quickly disengaged and fled south before turning north to come to the aid of the stricken Ariadne, which had been badly damaged by the British battlecruisers Stralsund and Danzig picked up around sixty men from Ariadne. Stralsund and the rest of the surviving light cruisers retreated into the haze and were reinforced by the battlecruisers of the I Scouting Group under Konteradmiral (KAdm—Rear Admiral) Franz Hipper. Stralsund and Danzig returned and rescued most of the crew of Ariadne. During the battle, Stralsund only received a single hit, and none of her crew were wounded.

==== Raid on Yarmouth ====
On 9 September, Stralsund and the cruiser Kolberg escorted the minelaying cruisers Albatross and Nautilus and the auxiliary minelayer Kaiser while they laid a minefield in the North Sea. In late September, Stralsund was temporarily moved to the Baltic Sea, where she took part in a sweep for Russian forces as far north as the northern tip of Gotland. She soon returned to the North Sea, and with II Scouting Group, sortied with the battlecruisers of I Scouting Group for the raid on Yarmouth. The operation was carried out on 2–3 November 1914, and the ships of II Scouting Group served as the reconnaissance screen for battlecruisers. While the battlecruisers bombarded the town of Yarmouth, Stralsund laid a minefield, which sank a steamer and the submarine HMS D5 which had sortied to intercept the German raiders. After completing the bombardment, the German squadron returned to port without encountering British forces. Stralsund and II Scouting Group next went to sea on 20 November in company with I Scouting Group for an uneventful patrol.

==== Raid of Scarborough, Hartlepool, and Whitby ====
Another battlecruiser raid was carried out on 15–16 December, this time against the coastal towns of Scarborough, Hartlepool, and Whitby. The two scouting groups left the Jade at 03:20. Hipper's ships sailed north, through the channels in the minefields, past Helgoland to the Horns Rev light vessel, at which point the ships turned westward, towards the English coast. The main battle squadrons of the High Seas Fleet left in the late afternoon of the 15th. During the night of 15 December, the main body of the High Seas Fleet encountered British destroyers, and fearing the prospect of a night-time torpedo attack, Admiral Friedrich von Ingenohl ordered the ships to retreat. Hipper's ships carried out the bombardment regardless, though they were unaware of Ingenohl's withdrawal. They then turned back to rendezvous with the German fleet.

By this time, the British battlecruiser force was in position to block Hipper's egress route, while other forces were en route to complete the encirclement. At 12:25, the light cruisers of II Scouting Group began to pass the British forces searching for Hipper. One of the cruisers in the 2nd Light Cruiser Squadron spotted Stralsund, and signaled a report to Beatty. At 12:30, Beatty turned his battlecruisers towards the German ships. Beatty presumed that the German cruisers were the advance screen for Hipper's ships, however, those were some 50 km (31 mi) ahead. The 2nd Light Cruiser Squadron, which had been screening for Beatty's ships, detached to pursue the German cruisers, but a misinterpreted signal from the British battlecruisers sent them back to their screening positions. This confusion allowed the German light cruisers to escape, and alerted Hipper to the location of the British battlecruisers. The German battlecruisers wheeled to the northeast of the British forces and made good their escape.

==== 1915 ====
On 25 December 1914, the British launched the Cuxhaven Raid, an air attack on the German naval base in Cuxhaven and the Nordholz Airbase. Stralsund engaged one of the attacking seaplanes, but was unable to shoot it down. Stralsund joined the light cruiser Graudenz on 3 January 1915 for a patrol into the North Sea to the west of Amrun Bank that ended without locating British forces. Stralsund next carried out a minelaying operation in company with Strassburg on 14–15 January off the Humber. The ship was again part of the reconnaissance screen for the I Scouting Group at the Battle of Dogger Bank on 24 January. Stralsund and Graudenz were assigned to the front of the screen and Rostock and Kolberg steamed on either side of the formation; each cruiser was supported by a half-flotilla of torpedo boats. At 08:15, lookouts on Stralsund and Kolberg spotted heavy smoke from large British warships approaching the formation. As the main German fleet was in port and therefore unable to support the battlecruisers, Hipper decided to retreat at high speed. The British battlecruisers were able to catch up to the Germans, however, and in the ensuing battle, the large armored cruiser Blücher was sunk.

Stralsund moved to the Baltic for another operation from 17 to 28 March, which targeted Russian forces that were attacking near Memel. On 23 March, she bombarded Russian positions and troop concentrations at Polangen, just to the north of Memel. She returned to the North Sea immediately, in time to participate in a fleet sweep into the North Sea on 29–30 March. She went to sea again on 17 April for a minelaying operation in company with Strassburg that lasted until the following day, this time to lay mines off the Swarte Bank. Stralsund and the rest of II Scouting Group carried out a patrol to the Dogger Bank area on 17–18 May. Another sortie by the entire High Seas Fleet took place on 29–30 May, and like the previous operations, the Germans failed to locate any British vessels. Stralsund embarked on sweeps on 28 June in the direction of Terschelling and on 2 July toward Horns Rev, again without result. That month, FK Karl Weniger replaced Harder as the ship's commander.

In August, Stralsund and the rest of II Scouting Group returned to the Baltic to take part in the Battle of the Gulf of Riga. The ships served as part of the covering force, under Hipper's command, that patrolled outside the gulf to prevent any Russian ships from counterattacking. During this period, Stralsund came under attack by the British submarine HMS E1, but the submarine's torpedoes missed. By 29 August, Stralsund had returned to the North Sea. She loaded 140 mines for another minelaying operation on 11–12 September; she laid this field between Terschelling and the Swarte Bank. Another fleet sortie took place on 23–24 October. For Stralsund, the year's operations came to an end with a sweep by II Scouting Group into the Skagerrak and Kattegat from 16 to 18 December.

==== 1916–1918 ====
Stralsund participated in a pair of patrols into the North Sea on 2–3 and 11 February 1916. She was then detached from II Scouting Group on 19 February for a major refit that began two days later at the Kaiserliche Werft shipyard in Kiel. Her twelve 10.5 cm guns were replaced with seven 15 cm SK L/45 guns and two 8.8 cm SK L/45 guns. She also had her forecastle extended by 10 m (33 ft) to raise the height of her broadside guns a deck higher, and her torpedo tubes were moved to the middle deck. She also had a night-fighting control station installed on the roof of her bridge. The work lasted until 17 June, and as a result, the ship was not available for the Battle of Jutland on 31 May – 1 June. In June, Kapitän zur See (KzS—Captain at Sea) Hans Gygas relieved Weniger as the ship's captain. Stralsund returned to active service on 6 July, and she briefly served as the flagship of KAdm Ludwig von Reuter, the commander of IV Scouting Group; she held this role from 10 to 17 July. She then returned to II Scouting Group, serving as its flagship from 4 August to 30 October, initially under KAdm Friedrich Boedicker until 11 September, when he was replaced by Reuter. During this period, she led II Scouting Group during the fleet sortie on 18–20 August, which resulted in the action of 19 August 1916, an inconclusive clash that left several ships on both sides damaged or sunk by submarines, but no direct fleet encounter.

Stralsund dry-docked in 1918, showing the damage inflicted by a mine

On 12 September, Stralsund embarked a floatplane, which was used operationally for the first time during a fleet sweep to the east of the Dogger Bank on 18–20 October. She went to sea on 4–5 November with the High Seas Fleet to come to the aid of the U-boats U-20 and U-30, which had run aground on the coast of Denmark. Stralsund was transferred from II Scouting Group to IV Scouting Group on 2 December, where she became the flagship of KAdm Karl Seiferling, though he remained aboard for only nine days. Stralsund participated in a patrol out to the Fisher Bank on 27–28 December. On 10 January 1917, the ships of IV Scouting Group carried out a minelaying operation in the North Sea between Helgoland and Norderney; they were reinforced by the cruiser Danzig during the operation. On 15 January, Kommodore (Commodore) Max Hahn took command of IV Scouting Group, making Stralsund his flagship. (Note: During the period between Seiferling and Hahn, the captain of the cruiser Bremse served as the acting commander of IV Scouting Group.) Stralsund spent the next several months participating in patrols of the southern North Sea, interrupted only by a period in the shipyard at the Kaiserliche Werft in Kiel for repairs to her turbines, which lasted from 7 August to 15 October. While Stralsund was under repair, Hahn shifted his flag permanently to the cruiser Regensburg.

On 22 October, Stralsund was ready to return to service, and she was sent to Libau in the Baltic. Operation Albion, the amphibious attack on the islands in the Gulf of Riga, had already ended in a German victory, so the ship quickly returned to the North Sea. From 11 to 20 November, KzS Paul Heinrich—the commander of I Torpedo-boat Flotilla—used Stralsund as his flagship. While Heinrich was aboard, the ship took part in a pair of sweeps into the North Sea as far as the lightship Noordhinder on 12 and 17 November. On 2 February 1918, while covering a minesweeping unit in the North Sea, Stralsund struck a mine laid by British ships. Though two of her watertight compartments flooded, she was able to steam under her own power back to Wilhelmshaven. The dreadnought Kaiser and several other ships steamed out to escort Stralsund back to port. Repairs lasted from 4 February to 25 April, and as a result, the ship was unavailable for the major fleet operation on 23–24 April to intercept a British convoy to Norway.

After returning to service, Stralsund joined the rest of IV Scouting Group for training exercises in the Baltic on 27 April. There, on 16 May, she was assigned as the flagship of KAdm Hugo Meurer, the commander of a sonderverband (special unit) that was to operate in the eastern Baltic. She sailed to Mariehamn, arriving on 19 May, where she relieved the cruiser Kolberg, which had been operating in the area. From there, Stralsund sailed for Helsingfors, Finland; there, KAdm Ludolf von Uslar replaced Meurer as the commander of naval forces in the area. Over the next few weeks, the ship cruised to various ports in the region, including Reval, Estonia; Mariehamn, Hanko, and Turku, Finland; Windau, Latvia; and Libau. The ship then departed Libau for Kiel, before moving back to the North Sea on 24 June. She remained there until 8 August, when she was ordered back to the Baltic for a major operation.

==== Operation Schlußstein and the end of the war ====
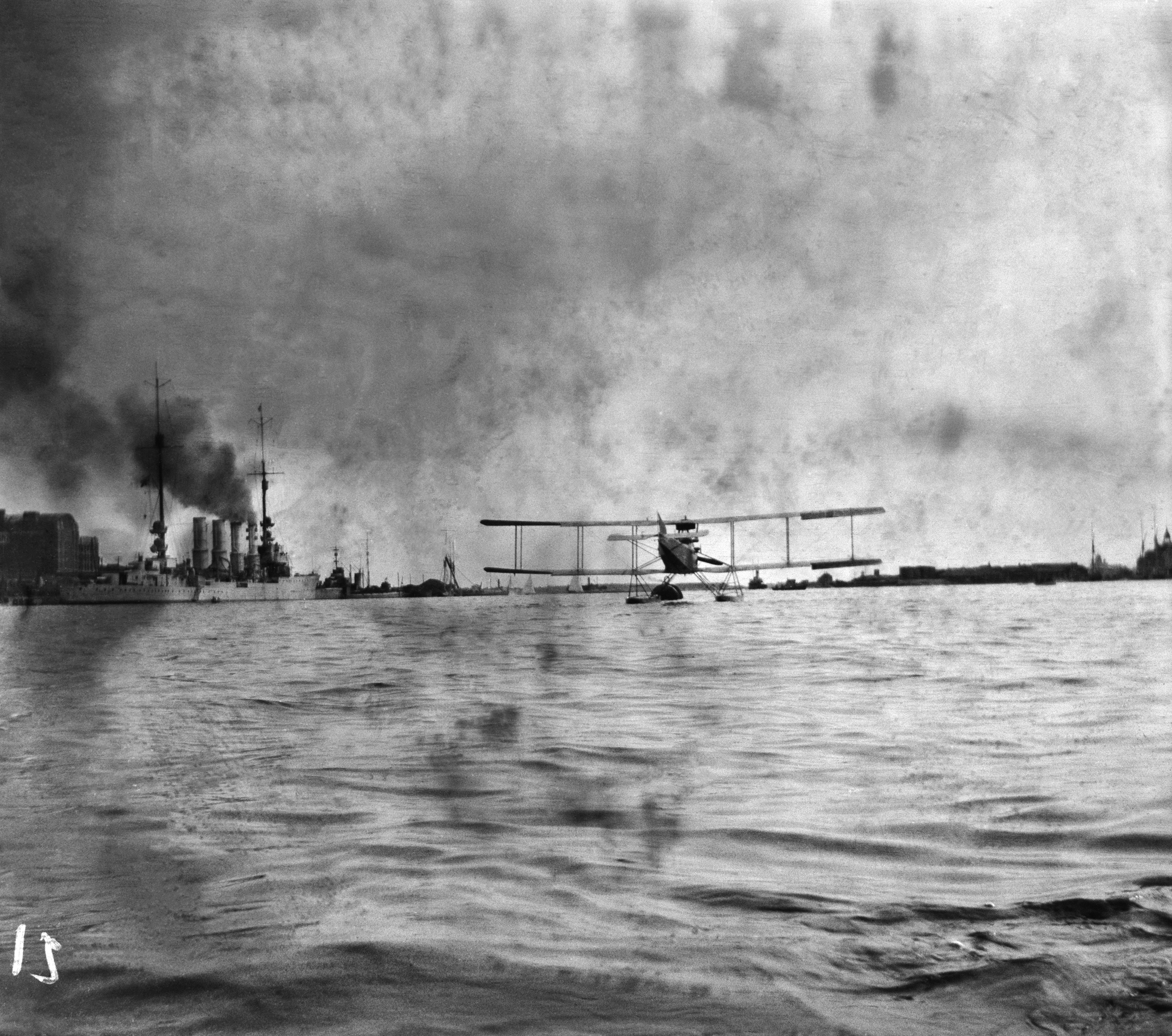
Stralsund and a floatplane in Helsingfors in 1918

Stralsund was assigned to a new sonderverband, which was to carry out Operation Schlußstein, under the command of now Vizeadmiral (Vice Admiral) Boedicker. The planned operation came about as a result of the uncertain military and political situation in Russia in the summer of 1918. The nascent Soviet government was fighting the Russian Civil War against the Whites, and British forces had intervened in northern Russia, occupying Murmansk. The Soviets, who had signed the Treaty of Brest-Litovsk with Germany, requested German help to expel the British, fight White forces, and suppress the Don Cossacks. Though Germany was interested in defeating British forces in north Russia, the German command had no desire to fight the anti-communist Whites or the Cossacks. Operation Schlußstein marked the beginning phase of the campaign against the British intervention in northern Russia; it was to begin with the occupation of St. Petersburg.

The ships assigned to Operation Schlußstein included the dreadnoughts Nassau, Ostfriesland, and Thüringen; the ships of IV Scouting Group—Stralsund, Strassburg, Regensburg, and Frankfurt—the cruiser Kolberg; the aviso Blitz; V Torpedoboat Flotilla; a seaplane tender, and numerous mine-warfare vessels and smaller craft. On 12 August, German forces began clearing minefields in the eastern Gulf of Finland, though the major warships of the unit remained behind in Kiel. Four days later, Boedicker and his staff moved to Stralsund, which sailed that day in company with Strassburg, bound for Libau. The ships then continued on to Reval, Helsingfors, Narva, Hungerburg, and Björkö. The wartime situation continued to deteriorate for Germany, which led to the postponement of Operation Schlußstein, and Stralsund was soon recalled. She passed through Helsingfors, Reval, and Libau before arriving back in Kiel. She then returned to the North Sea, arriving in Wilhelmshaven on 9 September, where Boedicker and his staff left the ship.

On 12 September, Stralsund returned to the Baltic and sailed back east, arriving in Björkö to relieve Strassburg as the guardship there on 16 September. She remained there for more than a month, during which time Operation Schlußstein was formally cancelled on 27 September. By that time, Germany's position in the Balkans began to collapse after the Vardar offensive on the Macedonian front inflicted a decisive defeat on German and Bulgarian forces. On 22 October, the old coastal defense ship Beowulf arrived to replace Stralsund, which departed for Helsingfors. She spent the last weeks of the war there, after which she returned to Kiel, where she was decommissioned on 17 December.

=== Postwar and French service ===
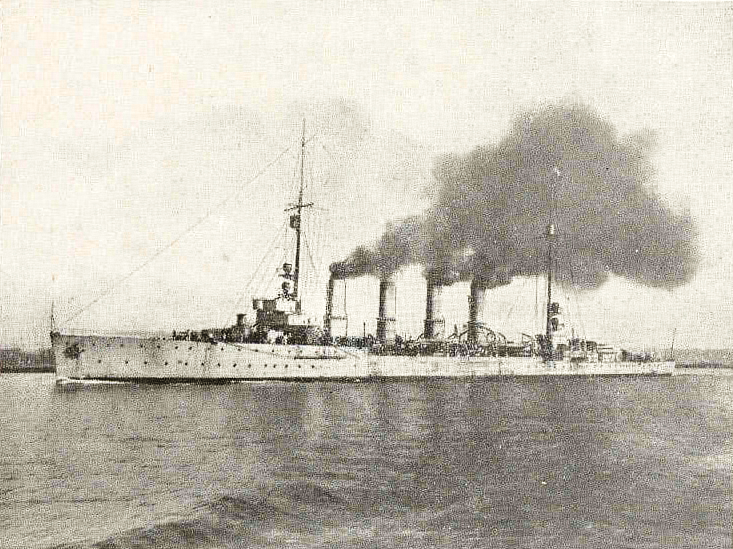
In French service as Mulhouse

After the war, Stralsund was not included in the fleet that was interned at Scapa Flow during the peace negotiations. She was instead permitted to remain in Germany, and the naval command hoped that she could be preserved for the postwar Reichsmarine. But after the scuttling of the German fleet at Scapa Flow in June 1919, shortly before the Treaty of Versailles was signed, this proved to be an unrealistic expectation. The Treaty of Versailles specified that the ship was to be disarmed and handed over to the Allies within two months of the signing of the treaty. Stralsund was accordingly struck from the naval register on 5 November 1919. She was ceded to France as a war prize under the transaction name "Z". Departing Germany on 28 July 1920 in company with the torpedo boat V130, the ships arrived in Cherbourg, France, on 3 August. There, she was formally handed that day.

On arriving in France, she underwent a minor refit that consisted primarily of replacing her 8.8 cm guns with 75 mm (3 in) anti-aircraft guns, though the rest of her original armament remained. She was renamed Mulhouse in honor of the eponymous city in Alsace that had been recovered from Germany at the end of World War I. She and four other ex-German or ex-Austro-Hungarian cruisers were commissioned into the French Navy in the early 1920s. Mulhouse was commissioned on 3 August 1922.

Mulhouse was assigned to the French Mediterranean Fleet as part of the 3rd Light Division in company with the other ex-German cruisers Metz and Strasbourg and the ex-Austro-Hungarian Thionville. The unit, which was renamed the 2nd Light Division in December 1926, was moved to the Atlantic in August 1928, though all of the ex-German and ex-Austro-Hungarian vessels were then placed in reserve, since the first generation of post-war cruisers were entering service in the French fleet. Mulhouse and the other old ships were first stationed in Brest, but were moved to the Landévennec in 1930. As the French fleet completed additional cruisers, it no longer had a need to keep Mulhouse in reserve, and she was struck from the naval register on 15 February 1933. She was sold to ship breakers in September, and was broken up in Brest by 1935. The ship's bell was later returned to Germany and is now on display at the Laboe Naval Memorial.
