= SMS Strassburg =

Light cruiser of the German Imperial Navy

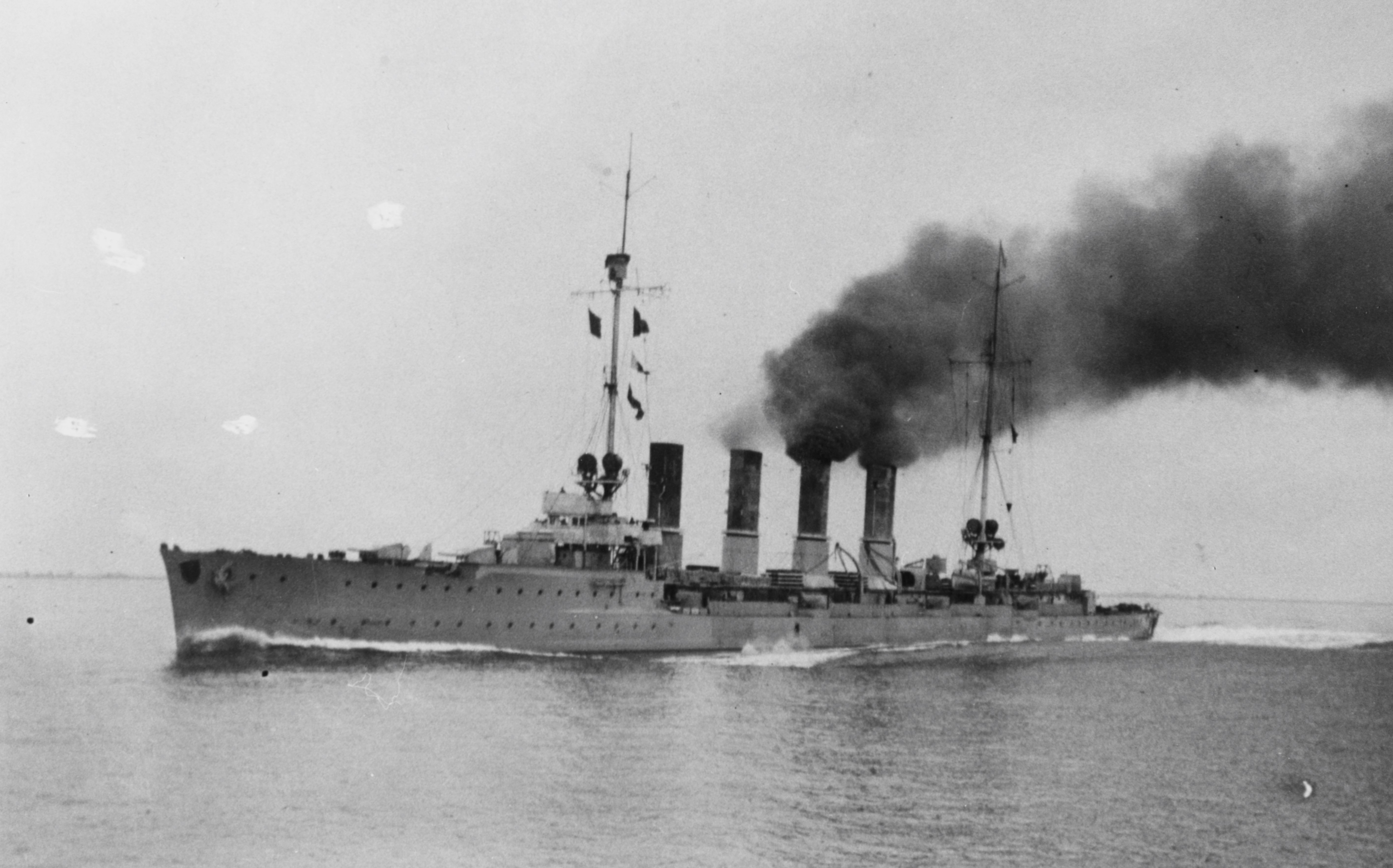
- SMS Strassburg

History

German Empire
- Name: SMS Strassburg
- Namesake: Strassburg
- Builder: Kaiserliche Werft Wilhelmshaven
- Laid down: October 1910
- Launched: 24 August 1911
- Commissioned: 1 October 1912
- Fate: Ceded to Italy in 1920

History

Italy
- Name: Taranto
- Acquired: 20 July 1920
- Commissioned: 2 June 1925
- Decommissioned: December 1942
- Fate: Sunk by air attack in 1944

General characteristics
- Class & type: Magdeburg-class cruiser
- Displacement: Normal: 4,564 t (4,492 long tons); Full load: 5,281 t (5,198 long tons)
- Length: 138.70 m (455 ft 1 in)
- Beam: 13.50 m (44 ft 3 in)
- Draft: 4.25 m (13 ft 11 in)
- Installed power: 16 × water-tube boilers; 25,000 PS (25,000 shp)
- Propulsion: 2 × steam turbines; 2 × screw propellers
- Speed: 27.5 knots (50.9 km/h; 31.6 mph)
- Range: 5,820 nmi (10,780 km; 6,700 mi) at 12 knots (22 km/h; 14 mph)
- Complement: 18 officers; 336 enlisted
- Armament: 12 × 10.5 cm (4.1 in) SK L/45 guns; 120 × mines; 2 × 50 cm (19.7 in) torpedo tubes
- Armor: Belt: 60 mm (2.4 in); Deck: 60 mm; Conning tower: 100 mm (3.9 in)

SMS Strassburg was a light cruiser of the Magdeburg class in the German Kaiserliche Marine (Imperial Navy). Her class included three other ships: Magdeburg, Breslau, and Stralsund. Strassburg was built at the Kaiserliche Werft shipyard in Wilhelmshaven from 1910 to October 1912, when she was commissioned into the High Seas Fleet. The ship was armed with a main battery of twelve 10.5 cm (4.1 in) SK L/45 guns and had a top speed of 27.5 knots (50.9 km/h; 31.6 mph).

Strassburg spent the first year of her service overseas, after which she was assigned to the reconnaissance forces of the High Seas Fleet. She saw significant action at the Battle of Heligoland Bight in August 1914 and participated in the raid on Scarborough, Hartlepool and Whitby in December 1914. By 1916, the ship was transferred to the Baltic to operate against the Russian Navy. She saw action during Operation Albion in the Gulf of Riga in October 1917, including screening for the battleships König and Markgraf during the Battle of Moon Sound. She returned to the North Sea for the planned final operation against the British Grand Fleet in the last weeks of the war, and was involved in the mutinies that forced the cancellation of the operation.

The ship served briefly in the new Reichsmarine in 1919 before being transferred to Italy as a war prize. She was formally transferred in July 1920 and renamed Taranto for service in the Italian Navy. In 1936–1937, she was rebuilt for colonial duties and additional anti-aircraft guns were installed. She saw no significant action during World War II until the Italian surrender, which ended Italy's participation in the war. She was scuttled by the Italian Navy, captured and raised by the Germans, and sunk by Allied bombers in October 1943. The Germans raised the ship again, which was sunk a second time by bombers in September 1944. Taranto was finally broken up for scrap in 1946–1947.

== Design ==
Plan and profile of the Magdeburg class

The Magdeburg-class cruisers were designed in response to the development of the British Invincible-class battlecruisers, which were faster than all existing German light cruisers. As a result, speed of the new ships had to be increased. To accomplish this, more powerful engines were fitted and their hulls were lengthened to improve their hydrodynamic efficiency. These changes increased top speed from 25.5 to 27 knots (47.2 to 50.0 km/h; 29.3 to 31.1 mph) over the preceding Kolberg-class cruisers. To save weight, longitudinal framing was adopted for the first time in a major German warship design. In addition, the Magdeburgs were the first cruisers to carry belt armor, which was necessitated by the adoption of more powerful 6-inch (150 mm) guns in the latest British cruisers.

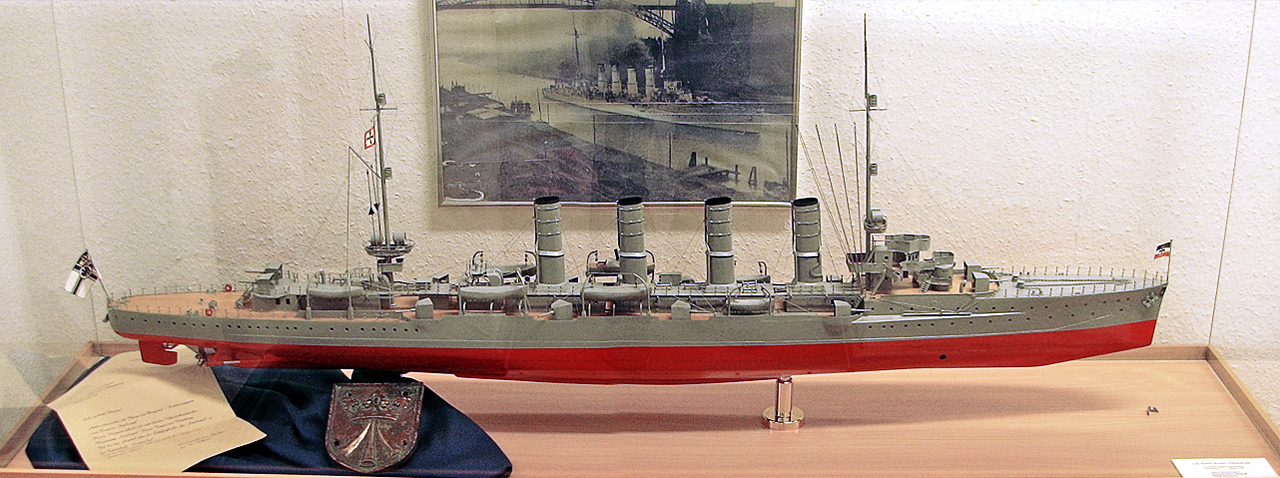
Model of a Magdeburg-class cruiser in the Marinemuseum in Dänholm

Strassburg was 138.70 m (455 ft 1 in) long overall and had a beam of 13.50 m (44 ft 3 in) and a draft of 4.25 m (13 ft 11 in) forward. She displaced 4,564 t (4,492 long tons) normally and up to 5,281 t (5,198 long tons) at full load. The ship had a short forecastle deck and a minimal superstructure that consisted primarily of a conning tower located on the forecastle. She was fitted with two pole masts with platforms for searchlights. Strassburg had a crew of 18 officers and 336 enlisted men.

Her propulsion system consisted of two sets of Marine-type steam turbines driving two screw propellers. They were designed to give 25,000 metric horsepower (18,390 kW; 24,660 shp), but reached 33,482 PS (24,626 kW; 33,024 shp) in service. These were powered by sixteen coal-fired Marine-type water-tube boilers, although they were later altered to use fuel oil that was sprayed on the coal to increase its burn rate. The boilers were vented through four funnels located amidships. These gave the ship a top speed of 27.5 knots (50.9 km/h; 31.6 mph). Strassburg carried 1,200 t (1,181 long tons) of coal, and an additional 106 t (104 long tons) of oil that gave her a range of approximately 5,820 nautical miles (10,780 km; 6,700 mi) at 12 knots (22 km/h; 14 mph).

The ship was armed with a main battery of twelve 10.5 cm (4.1 in) SK L/45 guns in single pedestal mounts. Two were placed side by side forward on the forecastle, eight were located on the broadside, four on either side, and two were side by side aft. The guns had a maximum elevation of 30 degrees, which allowed them to engage targets out to 12,700 m (13,900 yd). They were supplied with 1,800 rounds of ammunition, for 150 shells per gun. She was also equipped with a pair of 50 cm (19.7 in) torpedo tubes with five torpedoes; the tubes were submerged in the hull on the broadside. She could also carry 120 mines. In 1915, Strassburg was completely rearmed, replacing the 10.5 cm guns with seven 15 cm (5.9 in) SK L/45 guns, two 8.8 cm (3.5 in) SK L/45 guns, and two deck-mounted 50 cm torpedo tubes.

Strassburg was protected by a waterline armor belt and a curved armor deck. The deck was flat across most of the hull, but angled downward at the sides and connected to the bottom edge of the belt. The belt and deck were both 60 mm (2.4 in) thick. The conning tower had 100 mm (3.9 in) thick sides.

== Service history ==
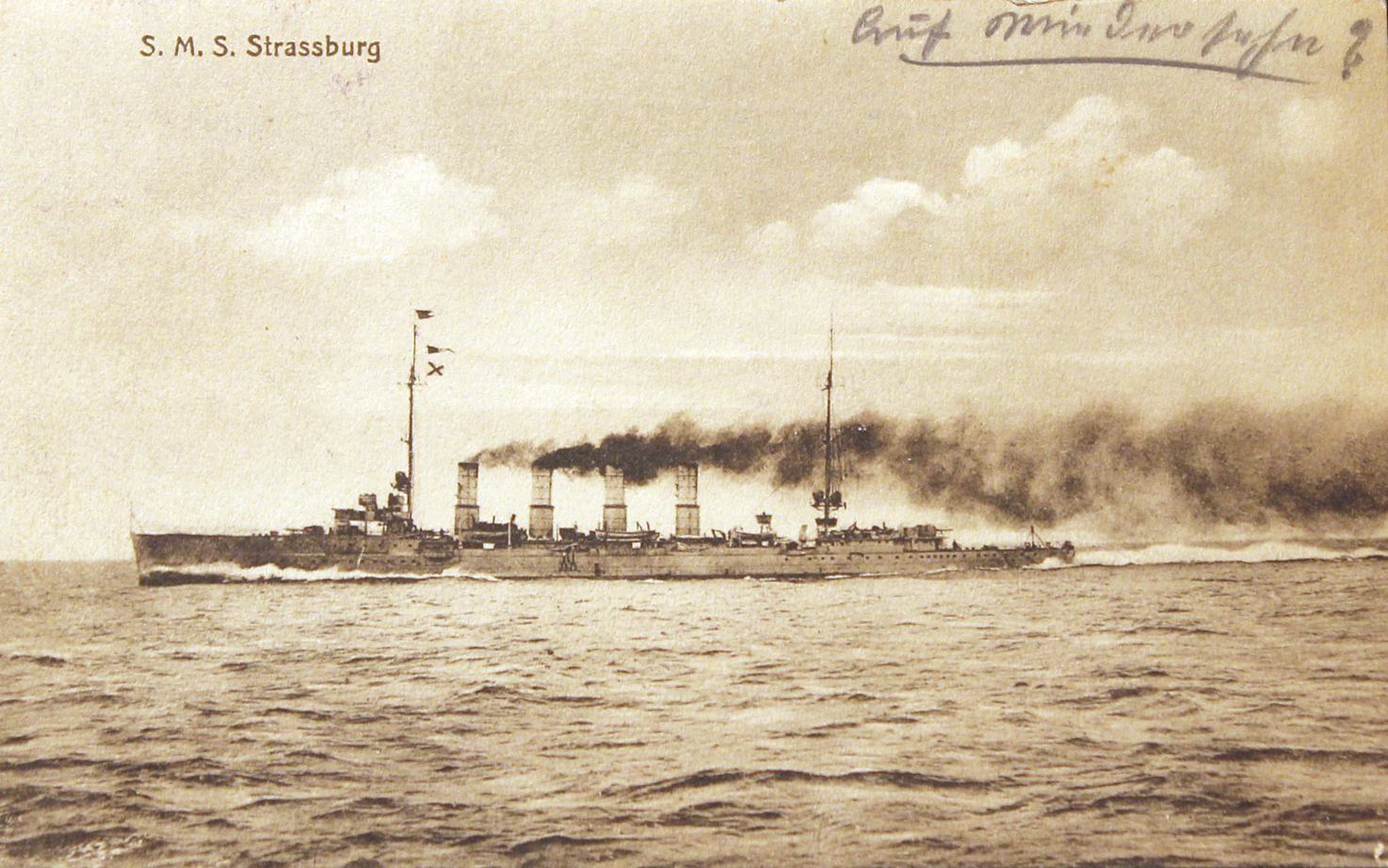
Strassburg underway

Strassburg was ordered under the contract name Ersatz Condor, (Note: German warships were ordered under provisional names. Additions to the fleet were given a single letter; ships intended to replace older or lost vessels were ordered as "Ersatz (name of the ship to be replaced)".) and was laid down at the Kaiserliche Werft (Imperial Shipyard) in Wilhelmshaven in October 1910 and launched on 24 August 1911, and Rudolf Schwander, the major of her namesake city, gave a speech at her launching ceremony. After her launching, fitting-out work commenced, including the installation of her engines, which were the first set of turbines designed by the Kaiserliche Werft. She was commissioned into active service on 1 October 1912 under the command of Fregattenkapitän (FK—Frigate Captain) Wilhelm Tägert. After completing initial sea trials, she was assigned to the Reconnaissance Unit on 23 December, taking the place of the older cruiser Berlin. At that time, Tägert was replaced by FK Wilhelm Paschen. On 6 January, Strassburg was accidentally rammed by the Danish steamer Christian IX, which was passing through the wrong side of the canal entrance. This delayed Strassburg's arrival for training exercises with the rest of her unit until 23 February.

Strassburg spent the first year of service overseas, from 1913 to 1914. She was first sent abroad on 6 April, when she sailed in company with the light cruiser Dresden for the Mediterranean Sea. She arrived in Valletta, Malta, on 13 April, where she joined the Mediterranean Division, commanded by Konteradmiral (Rear Admiral) Konrad Trummler aboard the battlecruiser Goeben. From there, Strassburg steamed to visit Alexandretta in the Ottoman Empire, followed by a stop in Constantinople, the Ottoman capital, in early May. By early June, she had entered the Adriatic Sea and stopped in Venice and Naples, Italy, and Pola in the Austro-Hungarian Empire. Later in June, the ship moved to the Aegean Sea and later cruised in the eastern Mediterranean, including off the coast of Ottoman Syria. Having stopped in Alexandretta again in early September, Strassburg got underway to return to Germany on 9 September. She arrived in Kiel two weeks later, anchoring in the harbor on 23 September.

She was then dry docked for an overhaul after her voyage abroad, during which FK Heinrich Retzmann relieved Paschen. The work was completed by 8 December, when she was selected to participate in a long-distance cruise to test the reliability of the new turbine propulsion system in the battleships Kaiser and König Albert. The three ships were organized in a special "Detached Division", under the command of Konteradmiral Hubert von Rebeur-Paschwitz. Strassburg got underway on 8 December and met the two battleships at sea the following day; they proceeded to the German colonies in western Africa by way of the Canary Islands. The ships visited Lomé in Togoland, Duala and Victoria in Kamerun, and Swakopmund in German South-West Africa. They then sailed south to Cape Town in British South Africa. From there, the ships sailed to St. Helena in the South Atlantic and then on to Rio de Janeiro, arriving on 15 February 1914. Rebeur-Paschwitz came aboard Strassburg, which was detached to visit Buenos Aires, Argentina for an official visit. While there, Rebeur-Paschwitz fell ill and had to go ashore to be hospitalized, so Strassburg departed without him on 12 March to meet the two battleships in Montevideo, Uruguay. After Rebeur-Paschwitz returned from the hospital, the three ships sailed south around Cape Horn and then north to Valparaíso, Chile, arriving on 2 April and remaining for over a week.

On 11 April, the ships departed Valparaíso for the long journey back to Germany. On the return trip, the ships visited several more ports, including Bahía Blanca, Argentina, before returning to Rio de Janeiro. On 16 May, the two battleships left Rio de Janeiro for the Atlantic leg of the journey to sail directly back to Germany; they arrived in Kiel on 17 June 1914. Strassburg was detached to proceed independently, by way of the West Indies. She assisted the German steamer Mecklenburg, which had run aground in the area, and then proceeded to the Dominican Republic to pressure the Dominican government over a disagreement with Germany. In the course of the voyage, the ships traveled some 20,000 nautical miles (37,000 km; 23,000 mi). She was anchored at Saint Thomas on 20 July when she received orders to return home. She reached Horta in the Azores on 27 July, and the next day sailed at top speed to pass through the English Channel with her lights dimmed owing to the July Crisis that threatened to instigate a major war in Europe. Strassburg arrived in Wilhelmshaven on 1 August, the day the German military mobilized at the start of World War I.

=== World War I ===
==== 1914 ====
German sketch showing maneuvers and actions of Strassburg at the Battle of Helgoland; the left silhouette is Strassburg

Strassburg joined II Scouting Group at the start of the conflict. Late on 17 August, some two weeks after the outbreak of World War I, Strassburg and Stralsund sortied to conduct a sweep into the Hoofden to search for British reconnaissance forces. They were accompanied by the U-boats U-19 and U-24, which were to ambush any British forces that counter-attacked. Early the following morning, Strassburg spotted a pair of British submarines, HMS E5 and E7. She opened fire on the submarines, but they submerged before she scored any hits. The two cruisers then encountered a group of sixteen British destroyers and a light cruiser at a distance of about 10,000 m (33,000 ft). Significantly outnumbered, the two German cruisers broke contact and returned to port. Strassburg joined the cruiser Rostock for another sweep on 21–22 August to sink British fishing trawler in the Dogger Bank area.

Strassburg was heavily engaged at the Battle of Heligoland Bight less than two weeks later, on 28 August. British battlecruisers and light cruisers raided the German reconnaissance screen commanded by Rear Admiral Leberecht Maass in the Heligoland Bight. Strassburg was at that time moored in Wilhelmshaven, and she was the first German cruiser to leave port to reinforce the German reconnaissance forces, departing at 09:10. She was joined soon thereafter by the light cruiser Cöln at 09:30; they were ordered to pursue the British light forces that had by then begun withdrawing. At 11:00, she encountered the badly damaged British cruiser HMS Arethusa, which had been hit several times by Stettin and Frauenlob. Strassburg attacked Arethusa, but was driven off by the 1st Destroyer Flotilla. She lost contact with the British in the mist, but located them again after 13:10 from the sound of British gunfire that destroyed the cruiser Mainz. Along with Cöln, she badly damaged three British destroyers—Laertes, Laurel, and Liberty—before being driven off again. In return, Strassburg was hit by a single 6-inch (152 mm) shell that struck above her belt armor and exploded, but did little damage. Shortly thereafter, the British battlecruisers intervened and sank Ariadne and Maass's flagship Cöln. As Strassburg withdrew, she had a close encounter with the British battlecruisers, but the British mistook her for one of their own cruisers in the hazy conditions. Strassburg and the rest of the surviving light cruisers retreated into the haze and were reinforced by the battlecruisers of I Scouting Group.

In early September, Strassburg moved to the Baltic Sea for an operation in company with the large armored cruiser Blücher that lasted from 3 to 6 September. She then returned to operations in the North Sea, and she participated in the raid on Yarmouth on 2–3 November. The ships of II Scouting Group carried out another sweep into the North Sea on 10 December that failed to locate any British forces. Strassburg was present during the raid on Scarborough, Hartlepool and Whitby on 15–16 December, as part of the screening force for the battlecruisers of Rear Admiral Franz von Hipper's I Scouting Group. After completing the bombardment of the towns, the Germans began to withdraw, though British forces moved to intercept them. Strassburg, two of the other screening cruisers, and two flotillas of torpedo boats steamed between two British squadrons. In the heavy mist, which reduced visibility to less than 4,000 yd (3,700 m), only her sister ship Stralsund was spotted, though only briefly. The Germans were able to use the bad weather to cover their withdrawal.

==== 1915–1916 ====
Strassburg covered a minelaying operation off the Amrun Bank on 3 January 1915, followed by another in company with Stralsund on 14 January off the Humber. Two days later, she was dry docked at Wilhelmshaven for periodic maintenance, and so she was not present for the operation that resulted in the Battle of Dogger Bank on 24 January. Work on the ship was completed by 31 January. The ships of II Scouting Group were sent to the Baltic on 17 March for an operation in the area of Åland that lasted from 21 to 24 March. By 9 April, Strassburg and the other cruisers had returned to the North Sea. Strassburg covered a mine-laying operation off the Swarte Bank on 17–18 April, and another off the Dogger Bank on 17–18 May. She joined the rest of the High Seas Fleet for a sweep into the North Sea on 29–30 May, which ended without encountering British vessels. She next participated in two patrols to inspect fishing boats off Terschelling and Horns Rev on 28 June and 2 July, respectively.

On 14 July, Strassburg was dry docked at the Kaiserliche Werft in Kiel to be rearmed with 15 cm guns; she was the first German light cruiser to be so rearmed. Work lasted until 18 October, and she also received a pair of 50 cm torpedo tubes on her main deck during the refit. Two days later, the ship arrived back in the North Sea and rejoined II Scouting Group. Shortly thereafter, she sortied for another fleet sweep into the North Sea on 23–24 October. Strassburg and the rest of II Scouting Group patrolled the Skagerrak and Kattegat for enemy merchant shipping from 16 to 18 December. That month, Retzmann left the ship, being replaced by FK Hans-Carl von Schlick. Another fleet sweep toward the Hoofden took place from 5 to 7 March 1916.

On 18 March, Strassburg was transferred to VI Scouting Group, which was based in the Baltic and operated in the naval campaign against Russian forces. Beginning in April, she was occupied with a series of minelaying operations in the Gulf of Finland. The ship next participated in a pair of sweeps toward Bogskär on 17–18 July and 16–17 August. The rest of 1916 passed uneventfully for Strassburg at Libau. She departed from that port on 17 January 1917 for an overhaul period at the AG Weser shipyard in Bremen. The work lasted nearly three months, and she arrived back in Libau on 7 April. She participated in four minelaying operations later that month.

==== Operation Albion ====
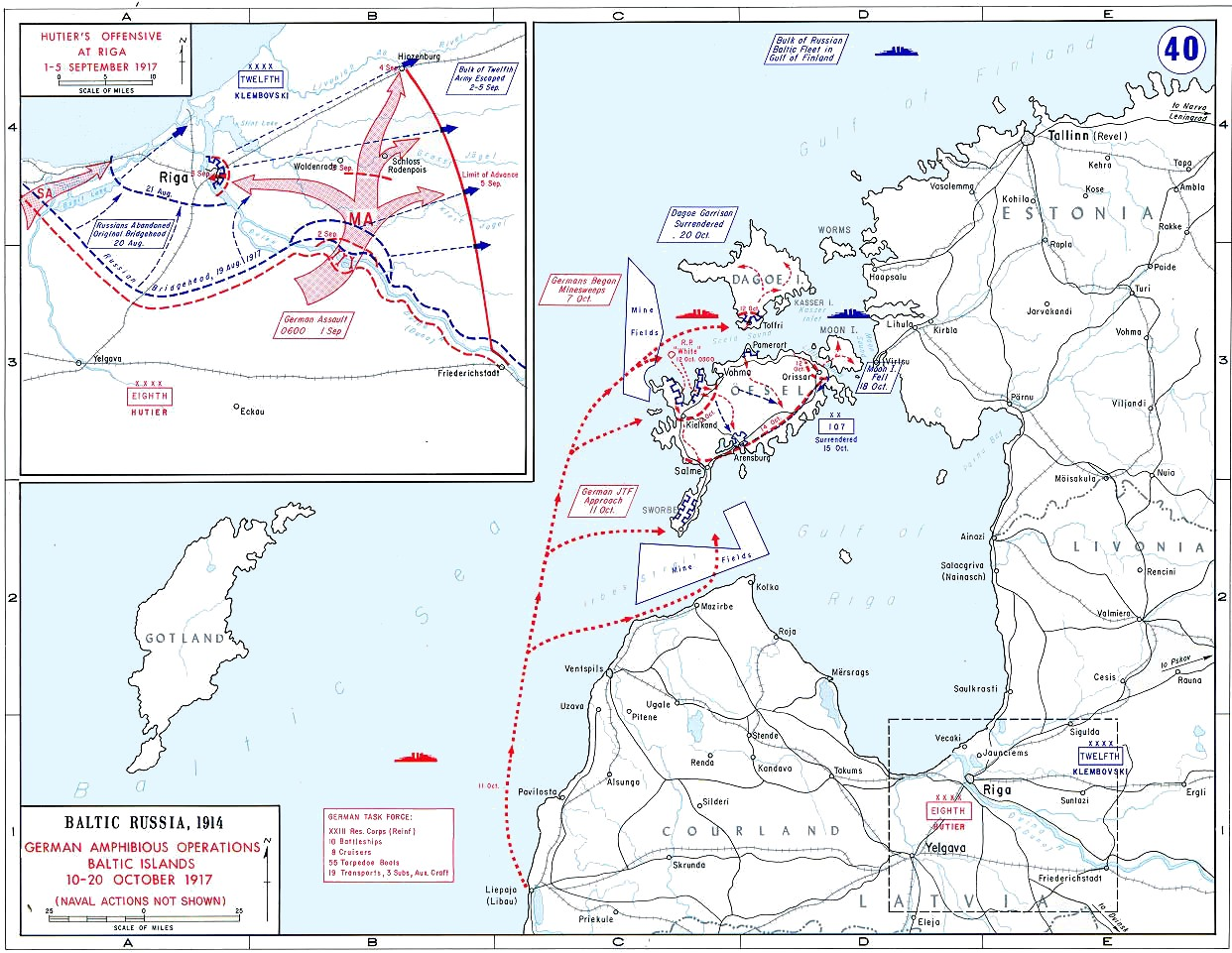
Map of German movements during Operation Albion

Strassburg and the rest of VI Scouting Group next saw action during Operation Albion against the Russian naval forces in the Gulf of Riga in October. While preparations for the operation were underway in September, Schlick was temporarily transferred to command the transport fleet, as he had prior experience with naval logistics. Strassburg's executive officer, FK Hans Quaet-Faslem, temporarily took command of the ship. At 06:00 on 14 October 1917, Strassburg, Kolberg, and Augsburg left Libau to escort minesweeping operations in the Gulf of Riga. They were attacked by Russian 12-inch (305 mm) coastal guns on their approach and were temporarily forced to turn away. By 08:45, however, they had anchored off the Mikailovsk Bank and the minesweepers began to clear a path in the minefields.

Two days later, Strassburg and Kolberg joined the dreadnoughts König and Kronprinz for a sweep of the Gulf of Riga. In the ensuing Battle of Moon Sound that began on the morning of 17 October, the battleships destroyed the old pre-dreadnought Slava and forced the pre-dreadnought Grazhdanin to leave the Gulf. On 21 October, Strassburg and the battleship Markgraf were tasked with assaulting the island of Kyno. The two ships bombarded the island; Strassburg expended approximately 55 rounds on the port of Salismünde. Four days later, she bombarded Salismünde, Kyno, and Hainasch again.

On 31 October, Strassburg carried General Adolf von Seckendorff, the first military governor of the captured islands, from Libau to Arensburg. The following day, she embarked General Hugo von Kathen, the commander of the landing force, along with his staff to be carried back to Libau. In November, Schlick returned to command of the cruiser, though later that month he was replaced by FK Paul Reichardt.

==== End of the war ====
With the strategic situation in the Baltic altered significantly in Germany's favor by the end of 1917, much of its naval forces could be withdrawn. On 14 December, Strassburg left Libau for Kiel for periodic maintenance, during which some consideration was given to converting the ship into an aircraft carrier, though this was not carried out. While work was still underway, the ship was assigned to the High Seas Fleet, and on 4 April, she arrived at her new unit, IV Scouting Group. The unit was led by Kommodore Johannes von Karpf aboard his flagship, the cruiser Regensburg. Strassburg next participated in the fleet operation on 23–24 April. This operation envisioned intercepting one of the convoys between Britain and Norway, which were being escorted by detached squadrons of the British Grand Fleet. The operation was cancelled after the battlecruiser Moltke slipped one of her propellers, temporarily leaving her dead in the water. Strassburg was the nearest vessel, and was first to come alongside and attempt to take her under tow. Her towline broke, and the battleship Oldenburg took over the tow. Strassburg remained with the ships as an escort during their return to port, only returning to the main body of the fleet later. In any event, German intelligence had failed to correctly identify when the next convoy sailed, and the High Seas Fleet returned to port empty-handed.

Strassburg (or her sister Stralsund) at sea, in 1915 or 1916

Strassburg took part in several minelaying operations in the North Sea in May and June. In August, she and the rest of IV Scouting Group were assigned to the naval component of Operation Schlußstein, a planned amphibious assault on St Petersburg, Russia. The ships, led by Stralsund, moved to Libau on 18 August, and then proceeded on to Finland, stopping in Helsingfors (Helsinki) and then Koivisto. From there, they sailed for Reval (Tallinn). The ships alternated at Koivisto, patrolling to guard the German forces during preparations for the attack. Strassburg remained at Koivisto from 9 to 17 September, returning thereafter to Reval. The operation was cancelled soon thereafter, and Strassburg returned to the North Sea, passing through Åbo (Turku), Mariehamn, Reval, and Libau before arriving on 1 October.

In late October, Strassburg was to participate in a final, climactic attack by the High Seas Fleet. Admirals Reinhard Scheer and Hipper intended to inflict as much damage as possible on the British navy, in order to secure a better bargaining position for Germany, whatever the cost to the fleet. On the morning of 27 October, days before the operation was scheduled to begin, around 45 crew members from Strassburg's engine room slipped over the side of the ship and went into Wilhelmshaven. The crewmen had to be rounded up and returned to the ship, after which the IV Scouting Group moved to Cuxhaven. Here, men from all six cruisers in the unit refused to work in protest of the war, and in support of the armistice proposed by Prince Maximilian. On the morning of 29 October 1918, the order was given to sail from Wilhelmshaven the following day. Starting on the night of 29 October, sailors on Thüringen and then on several other battleships mutinied. The unrest ultimately forced Hipper and Scheer to cancel the operation.

In an attempt to suppress the unrest, the fleet was dispersed, and Strassburg was sent to Cuxhaven on 30 October. From there, they moved to Kiel in early November, and Strassburg was sent to Sonderburg, north of Kiel. From there, the ships were moved again, this time to Sassnitz on 11 November. Strassburg was joined by the cruiser Brummer in Sassnitz. There, the commander of Strassburg took command of the naval forces in the port and invited a sailor's council to be formed to assist in controlling the forces there. The armistice that ended the war took effect that day, and Strassburg was disarmed there in accordance with Germany's surrender. Her crew was also reduced at that time. She was not included in the list of ships that were interned at Scapa Flow. On 20 March 1919, the ship received a full crew, and she became the flagship of the Minesweeping Unit of the Black Sea, an organization created on 24 March to clear the numerous minefields laid by German and Russian forces in the Baltic. This service continued for a year, until the Kapp Putsch of March 1920. After the war, Germany hoped to retain Strassburg for further service in the reorganized Reichsmarine, but the Allies demanded the vessel be surrendered as a replacement for the ships that had been sunk in the scuttling of the German fleet at Scapa Flow. On 17 March, the German naval command issued an order striking the ship from the naval register, to be effective as soon as she was decommissioned, which took place on 4 June.

=== Italian service ===
Strassburg was ceded to Italy as a war prize, and she departed Germany on 14 July in company with three other cruisers and four torpedo boats. They arrived in France on 19–20 July. She was transferred under the name "O" on 20 July in the French port of Cherbourg. Strassburg was commissioned into the Italian Regia Marina (Royal Navy) on 2 June 1925 and her name was changed to Taranto, initially classed as a scout. Her two 8.8 cm anti-aircraft guns were replaced with two Italian 3-inch /40 anti-aircraft guns. Her refit took longer to complete than any of the other ex-German or ex-Austro-Hungarian cruisers Italy received after the war, and she did not return to active service until June 1925. She also had her superfiring 15 cm gun moved amidships, but in 1926 it was moved back to clear room for a platform to hold a scout plane. She initially carried a Macchi M.7 flying boat, which was later replaced by a CANT 25AR flying boat.

From May 1926, Taranto was deployed to the Red Sea to patrol Italian East Africa, where she served as the flagship of the colonial flotilla there. She remained there until January 1927. Taranto was reclassified as a cruiser on 19 July 1929, and that year she joined the other two ex-German cruisers, Ancona and Bari and the ex-German destroyer Premuda as the Scout Division of the 1st Squadron, based in La Spezia. In 1931, her M.7 seaplane was replaced with the CANT 24AR seaplane. Another tour in East Africa followed from September 1935 to 1936. After returning to Italy, she underwent a refit that involved removing her forward two boilers and the funnel that vented them. This reduced her power to 13,000 shp (9,700 kW) and top speed to 21 kn (39 km/h; 24 mph), though by World War II only 18 knots (33 km/h; 21 mph) could be maintained. Eight 20 mm (0.79 in) /65 and ten 13.2 mm (0.52 in) machine guns were added for close-range anti-aircraft defense.

In 1940, after Italy formally entered the war, Taranto and Bari were only suitable for secondary roles; as a result, they were stationed in the Adriatic at Taranto. There, they carried out mining operations and coastal bombardments. In early July 1940, Taranto, the auxiliary cruiser Barletta, the minelayer Vieste, and the destroyers Carlo Mirabello and Augusto Riboty laid a series of minefields in the Gulf of Taranto and in the southern Adriatic, totaling 2,335 mines. She was thereafter assigned to the Forza Navale Speciale (Special Naval Force) along with the other ex-German cruiser still in Italian service, Bari. The FNS was slated to take part in an amphibious invasion of the British island of Malta in 1942, but the operation was cancelled.

Taranto was transferred to Livorno on 26 February and reduced to a training ship. The navy made plans to convert both Taranto and Bari into anti-aircraft cruisers in 1943, but the plans came to nothing. She was decommissioned in December 1942 in La Spezia and was scuttled there on 9 September 1943 a day after the armistice that ended the war for Italy was declared to prevent her from being seized by the Germans, who rapidly moved to occupy the country after Italy surrendered. The Germans captured the ship and re-floated her, though she was sunk by Allied bombers on 23 October. The Germans re-floated the ship again, and again she was sunk by bombers, on 23 September 1944 in the outer La Spezia roadstead, where the Germans had moved the hulk to block one of the entrances to the Gulf of La Spezia. Taranto was ultimately raised and broken up for scrap in 1946–1947.
