= SMS Yorck =

Armored cruiser of the German Imperial Navy

Coordinates: 53°40′N 8°5′E

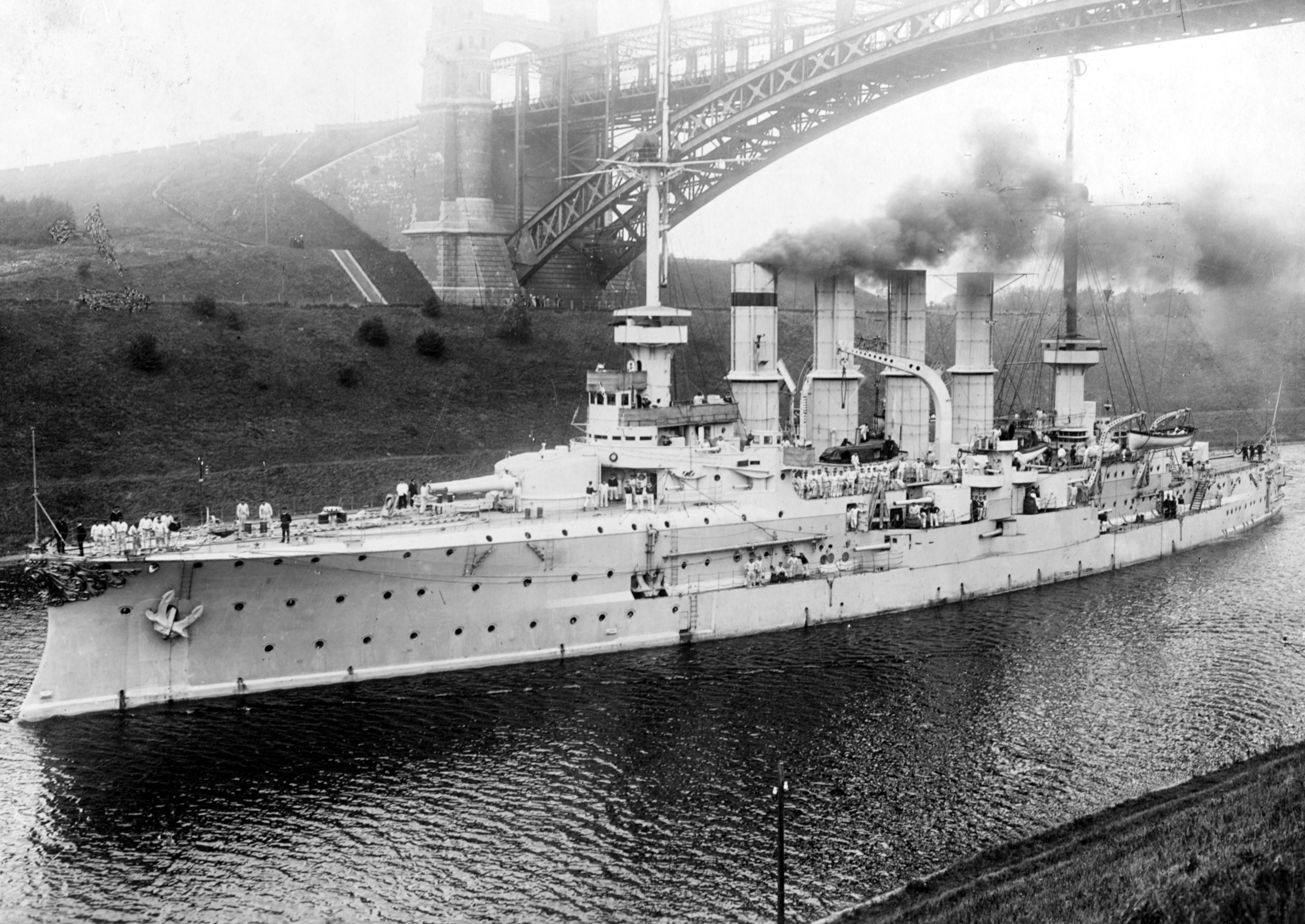
- Yorck in the Kaiser Wilhelm Canal, passing under the Levensau High Bridge

History

German Empire
- Name: Yorck
- Namesake: Ludwig Yorck von Wartenburg
- Builder: Blohm & Voss, Hamburg
- Laid down: 25 April 1903
- Launched: 14 May 1904
- Commissioned: 21 November 1905
- Decommissioned: 21 May 1913
- Commissioned: 12 August 1914
- Fate: Sunk accidentally by German mines, 4 November 1914

General characteristics
- Class & type: Roon-class cruiser
- Displacement: Normal: 9,533 t (9,382 long tons); Full load: 10,266 t (10,104 long tons)
- Length: 127.80 m (419 ft 3 in)
- Beam: 20.20 m (66 ft 3 in)
- Draft: 7.76 m (25.5 ft)
- Installed power: 17,272 metric horsepower (12,704 kW); 16 × water-tube boilers
- Propulsion: 3 × screw propellers; 3 × triple-expansion steam engines
- Speed: 20.4 knots (37.8 km/h; 23.5 mph)
- Range: 5,080 nmi (9,410 km; 5,850 mi) at 12 knots (22 km/h; 14 mph)
- Crew: 35 officers; 598 enlisted men
- Armament: 4 × 21 cm (8.3 in) SK L/40 guns; 10 × 15 cm (5.9 in) SK L/40 guns; 14 × 8.8 cm (3.5 in) SK L/35 guns; 4 × 45 cm (17.7 in) torpedo tubes
- Armor: Belt: 80–100 mm (3.1–3.9 in); Turrets: 150 mm (5.9 in); Deck: 40–60 mm (1.6–2.4 in)

SMS Yorck ("His Majesty's Ship Yorck") was the second and final ship of the Roon class of armored cruisers built for the German Kaiserliche Marine (Imperial Navy) as part of a major naval expansion program aimed at strengthening the fleet. Yorck was named for Ludwig Yorck von Wartenburg, a Prussian field marshal. She was laid down in April 1903 at the Blohm & Voss shipyard in Hamburg, launched in May 1904, and commissioned in November 1905. The ship was armed with a main battery of four 21 cm (8.3 in) guns and had a top speed of 20.4 knots (37.8 km/h; 23.5 mph). Like many of the late armored cruisers, Yorck was quickly rendered obsolescent by the advent of the battlecruiser; as a result, her peacetime career was limited.

Yorck spent the first seven years of her career in I Scouting Group, the reconnaissance force for the Heimatflotte (Home Fleet), initially as the group flagship. She made several cruises in the Atlantic Ocean during this period. Yorck was involved in several accidents, including an explosion aboard the ship in 1911 and a collision with a torpedo boat in 1913. In May 1913, she was decommissioned and placed in reserve until the outbreak of World War I in July 1914. She was then mobilized and assigned to III Scouting Group. On 3 November, she formed part of the screen for the High Seas Fleet as it sailed to support a German raid on Yarmouth; on the return of the fleet to Wilhelmshaven, the ships encountered heavy fog and anchored in the Schillig Roads to await better visibility. Believing the fog to have cleared sufficiently, the ship's commander ordered Yorck to get underway in the early hours of 4 November. She entered a German minefield in the haze, struck two mines, and sank with heavy loss of life. The wreck was dismantled progressively between the 1920s and 1980s to reduce the navigational hazard it posed.

== Design ==
The two Roon-class cruisers were ordered in 1902 as part of the fleet expansion program specified by the Second Naval Law of 1900. The two ships were incremental developments of the preceding Prinz Adalbert-class cruisers, the most significant difference being a longer hull; the extra space was used to add a pair of boilers, which increased horsepower by 2,000 indicated horsepower (1,500 kW) and speed by an intended 0.5 knots (0.93 km/h; 0.58 mph). Although the new cruisers were an improvement over earlier vessels, the launch of the British battlecruiser HMS Invincible in 1907 quickly rendered all of the armored cruisers that had been built by the world's navies obsolescent. (Note: Battlecruisers carried battleship-grade armament, initially 30.5 cm (12 in) guns, and were faster than most earlier armored cruisers because they used steam turbines instead of reciprocating engines. The disparity in capabilities was aptly demonstrated by the Battle of the Falkland Islands in 1914, where a pair of British battlecruisers caught and then used their greater firepower to overwhelm the two German Scharnhorst-class cruisers.)

=== Characteristics ===
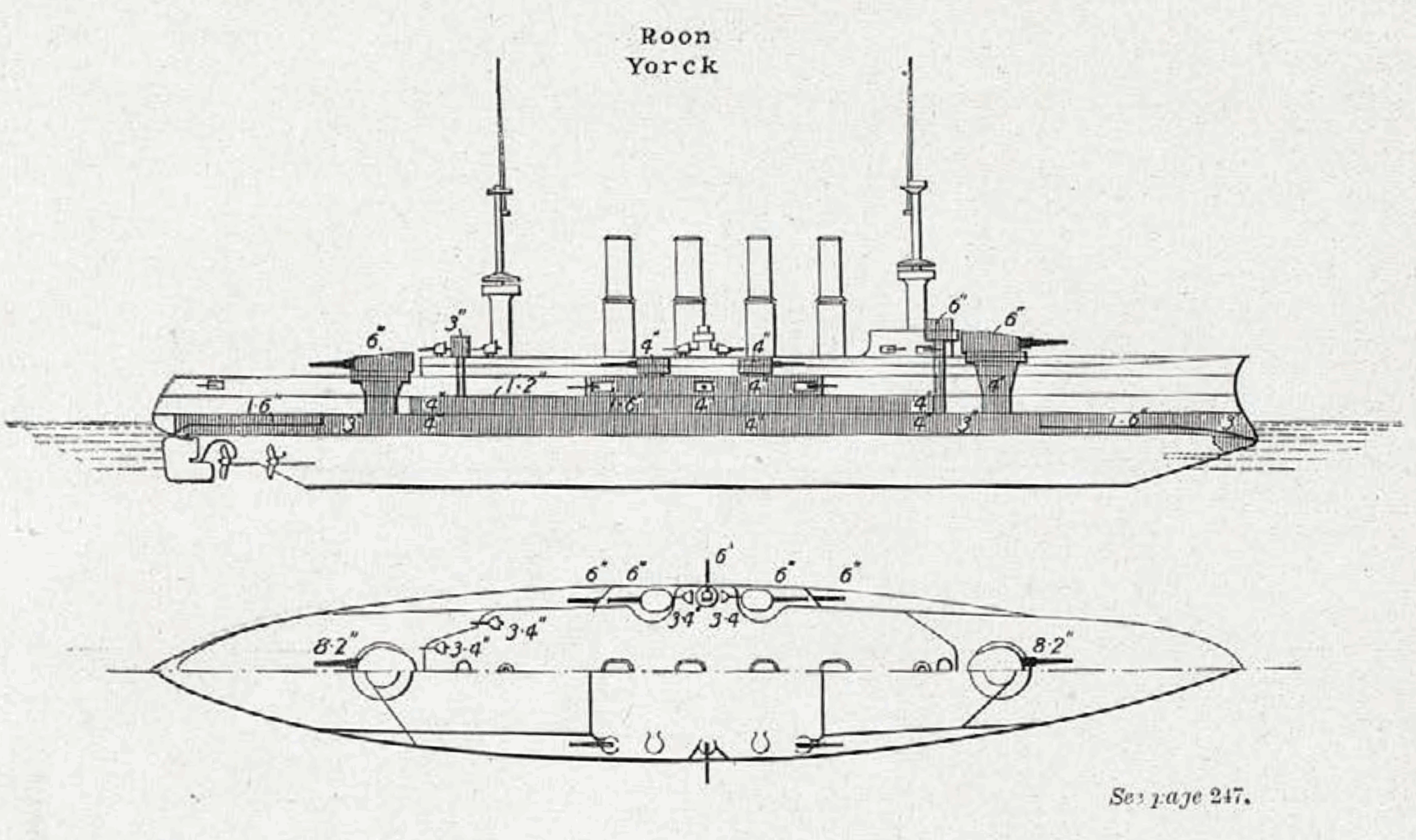
Plan and profile of the Roon class

Yorck was 127.8 m (419 ft) long overall and had a beam of 20.2 m (66 ft 3 in) and a draft of 7.76 m (25 ft 6 in) forward. She displaced 9,533 t (9,382 long tons; 10,508 short tons) as built and 10,266 t (10,104 long tons; 11,316 short tons) fully loaded. The ship had a pronounced ram bow and a small superstructure that consisted primarily of an armored conning tower and bridge structure forward and a smaller, secondary conning tower further aft. She was fitted with a pair of short military masts, which stepped down to lighter poles to reduce weight high in the ship. Yorck had a crew of 35 officers and 598 enlisted men, though this was frequently augmented with an admiral's staff during periods when she served as a flagship.

The ship's sixteen coal-fired water-tube boilers powered the three vertical triple-expansion steam engines that drove the three propeller shafts. The boilers were vented through four closely spaced funnels. Yorck's propulsion system developed a total of 17,272 metric horsepower (12,704 kW) and yielded a maximum speed of 20.4 knots (37.8 km/h; 23.5 mph) on trials, falling short of her intended speed of 22 knots (41 km/h; 25 mph). She carried up to 1,570 t (1,550 long tons; 1,730 short tons) of coal, which enabled a maximum range of up to 5,080 nautical miles (9,410 km; 5,850 mi) at a cruising speed of 12 knots (22 km/h; 14 mph).

Yorck was armed with four 21 cm (8.3 in) SK L/40 guns arranged in two twin-gun turrets, (Note: In Imperial German Navy gun nomenclature, "SK" (Schnelladekanone) denotes that the gun is quick loading, while the L/40 denotes the length of the gun. In this case, the L/40 gun is 40 calibers, meaning that the gun is 40 times as long as it is in bore diameter.) one on either end of the superstructure. Her secondary armament consisted of ten 15 cm (5.9 in) SK L/40 guns; four were in single-gun turrets on the upper deck and the remaining six were in casemates in a main-deck battery. For close-range defense against torpedo boats, she carried fourteen 8.8 cm (3.5 in) SK L/35 guns, all in individual mounts in the superstructure or in the hull. She also had four 45 cm (17.7 in) underwater torpedo tubes, one in the bow, one in the stern, and one on each broadside. She carried a total of eleven torpedoes.

The ship was protected with Krupp cemented armor, with the belt armor being 100 mm (3.9 in) thick amidships and tapering to 80 mm (3.1 in) on either end. The main battery turrets had 150 mm (5.9 in) thick faces. Her deck was 40–60 mm (1.6–2.4 in) thick, connected to the lower edge of the belt by 40–50 mm (1.6–2.0 in) thick sloped armor.

== Service history ==
=== Construction – 1908 ===
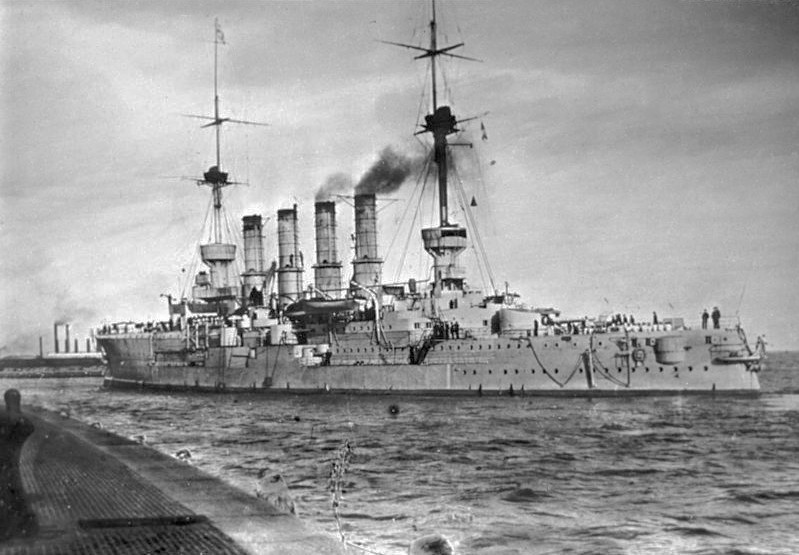
An unidentified Roon-class cruiser

Yorck was ordered under the provisional name Ersatz Deutschland, (Note: German warships were ordered under provisional names. Additions to the fleet were given a single letter; ships intended to replace older or lost vessels were ordered as "Ersatz (name of the ship to be replaced)".) and was built at the Blohm & Voss shipyard in Hamburg under construction number 167. Her keel was laid down on 25 April 1903 and she was launched on 14 May 1904. Generaloberst (Colonel General) Wilhelm von Hahnke gave a speech at the launching ceremony, where Josephine Yorck von Wartenburg christened Yorck after Ludwig Yorck von Wartenburg, a Prussian general during the Napoleonic Wars. Fitting-out work was completed by late 1905, when the ship began builder's trials. After a shipyard crew transferred the vessel to Kiel, she was commissioned into the fleet on 21 November. Yorck initially served with the fleet in I Scouting Group, which she formally joined on 27 March 1906. On 2 April, she replaced the armored cruiser Friedrich Carl as the group flagship, under the command of Vizeadmiral (VAdm—Vice Admiral) Gustav Schmidt. Over the next several years, Yorck took part in the peacetime routine of training exercises with the fleet reconnaissance forces and with the entire Heimatflotte (Home Fleet), including major fleet exercises every autumn in late August and early September.

On 29 September, Konteradmiral (KAdm—Rear Admiral) Hugo von Pohl replaced Schmidt as the group commander. After 1907's autumn maneuvers, Yorck went into drydock for an extensive overhaul from 11 September to 28 October. While she was out of service, Pohl was replaced by KAdm August von Heeringen, who raised his flag aboard Yorck upon her return from the shipyard. The ship went on a major cruise into the Atlantic Ocean from 7 to 28 February 1908 with the other ships of the scouting group. During the cruise, the ships conducted various tactical exercises and experimented with using their wireless telegraphy equipment at long distances. They stopped in Vigo, Spain, to replenish their coal for the voyage home. On 1 May, the new armored cruiser Scharnhorst joined I Scouting Group, replacing Yorck as the group flagship.

Another Atlantic cruise followed in July and August; this time, the cruise was made in company with the battleship squadrons of what had been by then renamed the High Seas Fleet. Prince Heinrich, then the fleet commander, had pressed for such a cruise the previous year, arguing that it would prepare the fleet for overseas operations and would break up the monotony of training in German waters, though tensions with Britain over the developing Anglo-German naval arms race were high. The fleet departed Kiel on 17 July, passed through the Kaiser Wilhelm Canal to the North Sea, and continued to the Atlantic. Yorck stopped in Funchal in Madeira and A Coruña, Spain during the cruise. The fleet returned to Germany on 13 August. The autumn maneuvers followed from 27 August to 12 September. Yorck won the Kaiser's Schießpreis (shooting prize) for excellent shooting among armored cruisers for the 1907–1908 training year. In October, Kapitän zur See (KzS—Captain at Sea) Arthur Tapken took command of the ship; he served as the ship's commander until September 1909.

=== 1909–1913 ===
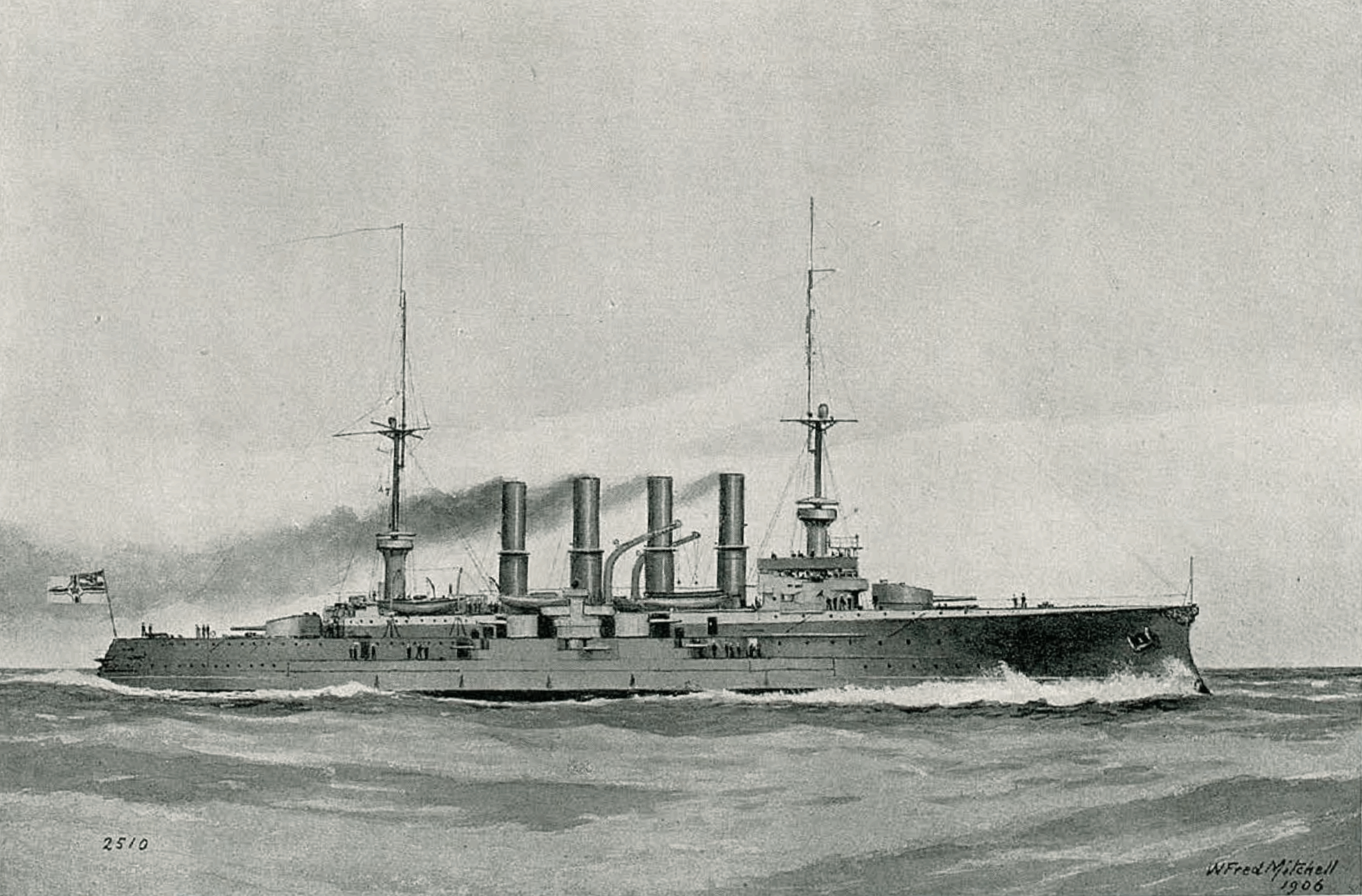
Sketch of Yorck by William Frederick Mitchell

In February 1909, I Scouting Group went on another training cruise in the Atlantic; Yorck again stopped in Vigo from 17 to 23 February. After the ships' return to Germany, Scharnhorst was detached to the East Asia Squadron on 11 March, vacating the flagship role, which Yorck again filled. Heeringen and the command staff returned to the ship the same day. The cruisers joined the High Seas Fleet for another Atlantic cruise in July and August, and Yorck visited Vilagarcía de Arousa from 18 to 26 July. On the way back to Germany, the fleet stopped in Spithead, England, where it was received by the Royal Navy. By early 1910, the new armored cruiser Blücher was ready for service with the fleet, and so now-VAdm Heeringen left Yorck on 25 April and transferred to the new vessel two days later. Yorck thereafter became the flagship of KAdm Reinhard Koch, the deputy commander of the group. Already on 16 May, Koch was replaced by KAdm Gustav Bachmann, who was in turn replaced by KAdm Maximilian von Spee on 15 September when Bachmann succeeded Heeringen as the group commander. Yorck won the Schießpreis for the 1909–1910 year. KzS Ludwig von Reuter served as the ship's commander from September 1910.

While in a shipyard for maintenance on 31 March 1911, a benzene explosion in the ship's aft-most boiler room killed one man and injured several, preventing Yorck from taking part in unit maneuvers. On 1 October, KzS and Kommodore (Commodore) Franz von Hipper replaced Spee, after which the ship joined a cruise to Norway and Sweden in November. She visited Uddevalla, Sweden, from 3 to 6 November during the cruise. Yorck did not take part in the unit maneuvers conducted in February 1912. In March, Yorck and four light cruisers filled I Scouting Group's role during fleet exercises, and during the maneuvers now-VAdm Bachmann came aboard Yorck to direct their participation. In September, Fregattenkapitän (Frigate Captain) Max Köthner replaced Reuter as the ship's captain, though he served in the role only briefly before departing in November. The ship suffered an accident on 2 November when one of her pinnaces detonated a naval mine, killing two men and injuring two more.

Yorck was involved in another serious accident on 4 March 1913 during training exercises off Helgoland. The torpedo boat S178 attempted to pass in front of the ship but failed to clear her in time; Yorck's bow tore a hole into S178 that flooded her engine and boiler rooms. S178 sank within a few minutes of the accident and 69 men were killed. Yorck, the battleship Oldenburg, and the torpedo boat S177 were only able to pull fifteen men from the sea. Yorck was able to continue with the maneuvers, as she had been only slightly damaged in the accident. Yorck thereafter steamed to Kiel, where on 21 May she was decommissioned, the last armored cruiser to serve with I Scouting Group. She then underwent an overhaul and was placed in reserve. Most of her crew transferred to the newly completed battlecruiser Seydlitz.

=== World War I ===
Yorck underway, c. 1914

Following the outbreak of World War I in July 1914, Yorck was mobilized for active service; she was recommissioned on 12 August under the command of KzS Waldemar Pieper. Initially assigned to IV Scouting Group, on 25 August she was transferred to III Scouting Group, under the command of KAdm Hubert von Rebeur-Paschwitz. Beginning on 20 September, she was tasked with guarding the German Bight. The ships of III Scouting Group transferred temporarily to the Baltic Sea two days later for a sortie into the central Baltic, as far north as Östergarn on the Swedish island of Gotland, from 22 to 29 September. They then returned to the North Sea and rejoined the High Seas Fleet.

On 3 November, Yorck participated in the first offensive operation of the war conducted by the German fleet. I Scouting Group, by now commanded by RAdm Hipper, was to bombard Yarmouth on the British coast while the bulk of the High Seas Fleet sailed behind, providing distant support. Yorck and the rest of III Scouting Group provided the reconnaissance screen for the main fleet, which would intervene only in the event that the raid provoked a British counterattack. Hipper's ships inflicted little damage and minelayers laid minefields off the coast, which later sank the British submarine D5. Upon returning to Wilhelmshaven late that day, the German ships encountered heavy fog that prevented them from safely navigating the defensive minefields that had been laid outside the port. Instead, they anchored in the Schillig roadstead.

Pieper, concerned about paratyphus-contaminated water, believed the fog to have cleared sufficiently to allow the vessel to return to port, so he ordered the ship to get underway in the early hours of 4 November. The pilot who had come aboard to guide the ship into port refused to take responsibility for maneuvering the ship owing to the great danger of trying to pass through the minefields under the foggy conditions. At 04:10, Yorck struck a mine and began to turn to exit the minefield, striking a second mine shortly thereafter. She quickly sank with heavy loss of life, though sources disagree on the number of fatalities. The naval historian V. E. Tarrant states that 127 out of a crew of 629 were rescued; Erich Gröner contends that there were only 336 deaths. The naval historians Hans Hildebrand, Albert Röhr, and Hans-Otto Steinmetz concur with Gröner on the number of fatalities and add that 381 men, including Pieper, were rescued by the coastal defense ship Hagen.

For his reckless handling of the ship, Pieper was tried in a court-martial, convicted, and sentenced to two years' imprisonment for negligence, disobedience of orders, and homicide through negligence. Pieper was later released and sent to the Ottoman Empire to help reorganize Ottoman defenses during the Dardanelles campaign. The wreck, located between Horumersiel and Hooksiel, was initially marked to allow vessels to pass safely. Beginning in 1926, the wreck was partially scrapped to reduce the navigational hazard to deeper-draft vessels. More work was done in 1936–1937 for the same reason. During a series of construction programs to expand the entrance to the Jade Bight after World War II, the ship's turrets were removed in 1969 and the remaining parts of the hull were demolished in 1983 to further clear the sea floor.
