= Raid on Yarmouth =

Raid carried out by the Imperial German Navy

- Part of the First World War
- North Sea
Date	3–4 November 1914
Location	Great Yarmouth, Norfolk, England. 52.57°N 1.75°E
Result	Inconclusive

Belligerents
United Kingdom	German Empire

Commanders and leaders
David Beatty	Franz von Hipper

Strength
3 destroyers; 1 minesweeper; 3 submarines	3 battlecruisers; 2 armoured cruisers; 4 light cruisers

Casualties and losses
21 killed; 3 wounded; 1 submarine sunk	235 killed
- Three British fishing trawlers were sunk during the raid
- Location of Great Yarmouth

The Raid on Yarmouth, on 3 November 1914, was an attack by the Imperial German Navy on the British North Sea port and town of Great Yarmouth. German shells landed on the beach causing little damage to the town, after German ships laying mines offshore were interrupted by British destroyers. The British submarine HMS D5 was sunk on a mine as it was leaving harbour to attack the German ships. By coincidence, a German armoured cruiser was sunk after striking two German mines outside its home port.

== Background ==
In October 1914, the Imperial German Navy (Kaiserliche Marine) sought ways to reduce the numerical superiority of the Royal Navy. A fleet engagement was too risky when the German fleet was so badly outnumbered. The Germans planned to attack British ships individually or in small groups, gradually reducing the British superiority in numbers. The Kaiser had ordered that no fleet action was to take place but small groups of ships might still take part in raids. The German raids were to mine British waters, to pick off solitary ships or to entice larger groups into pursuing and being ambushed by the German High Seas Fleet, in relatively safe waters near Germany.

Raiding British coastal towns might force the Royal Navy to alter the disposition of its ships to protect them. The British kept the greater part of the Grand Fleet together, so it would have superiority if it engaged the German Navy. The Germans hoped to encourage the British to detach more ships from the Grand Fleet for coastal defence, increasing the likelihood that the German Navy could attack isolated ships before the Grand Fleet could intervene.

== Prelude ==
The Yarmouth raid was carried out by the German battlecruiser squadron (Admiral Franz von Hipper) with the battlecruisers SMS Seydlitz, Von der Tann and Moltke, the slightly smaller armoured cruiser Blücher and the light cruisers SMS Strassburg, Graudenz, Kolberg and Stralsund. Mines were to be laid off Yarmouth and Lowestoft and the ships were to bombard Yarmouth with their guns.

== Raid ==
At 16:30 on 2 November 1914, the battlecruiser squadron left its base on the Jade River. Two squadrons of German battleships followed slightly later, to lie in wait for ships that the battlecruisers might have lured. By midnight, the squadron was sufficiently north to be passing fishing trawlers from various countries.

By 06:30 on 3 November, the patrol sighted a marker buoy at "Smith's Knoll Watch", allowing them to determine their exact position and close in to Yarmouth. The Yarmouth coast was patrolled by the minesweeper HMS Halcyon and the old destroyers HMS Lively and Leopard. Halcyon spotted two cruisers, which she challenged. The response came in the form of shellfire from small and then larger guns. Arthur Pollen wrote that

Private letters speak of salvoes falling short and over in the most disconcerting manner, and of the ship being so drenched with water as to be in danger of foundering. One man was lost through a fragment of a shell.

— Pollen

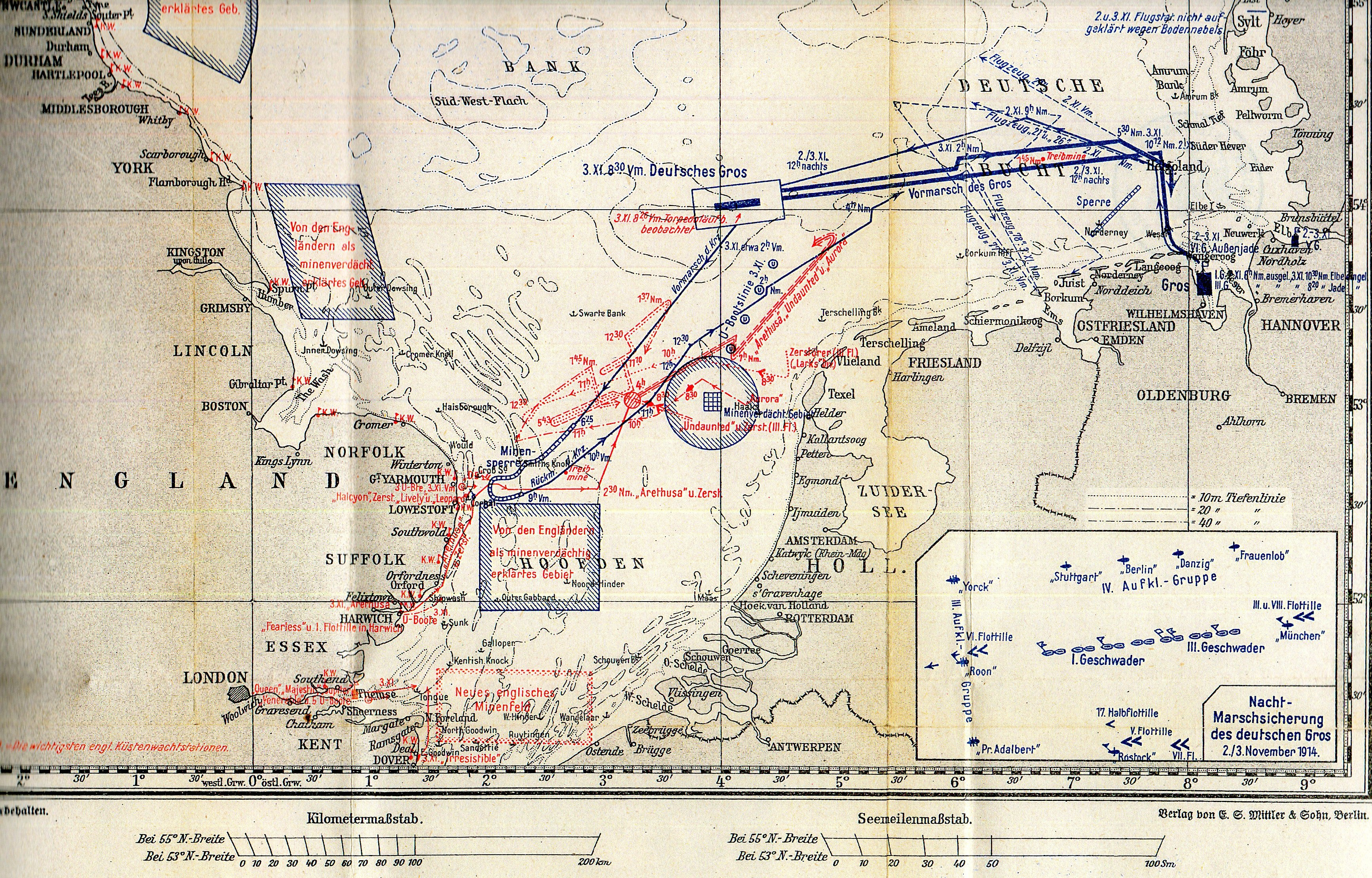
Outline map; bombardment of Yarmouth by German naval forces on 3 November 1914

Lively, some 2 mi (1.7 nmi; 3.2 km) behind—started to make smoke to hide the ships. German shooting was less accurate than it might have been because all the battlecruisers fired upon her at once, making it harder for each ship to see their fall of shot and correct their aim. At 07:40, Hipper ceased firing at Lively and directed some shells toward Yarmouth, which hit the beach. Once Stralsund had finished laying mines, the ships departed.

Halcyon, out of immediate danger—radioed a warning of the presence of German ships. The destroyer HMS Success moved to join them, while three more destroyers in harbour began raising steam. The submarines HMS E10, D5 and D3—inside the harbour—moved out to join the chase, but D5 struck a mine and sank. At 08:30, Halcyon returned to harbour and provided a report of what had happened.

At 09:55, Admiral David Beatty was ordered south with a battlecruiser squadron and squadrons of the Grand Fleet following from Ireland. By then, Hipper was 50 mi (43 nmi; 80 km) away, heading home. German ships waited overnight in Schillig Roads for fog to clear before returning to harbour. (Note: In the fog, the armoured cruiser SMS Yorck, sailing from the Jade Bay to Wilhelmshaven on an unrelated purpose, went off course and hit two mines. A number of the crew survived by sitting on the wreck of the ship, which had sunk in shallow water but at least 235 men were killed (reports vary).)

== Aftermath ==
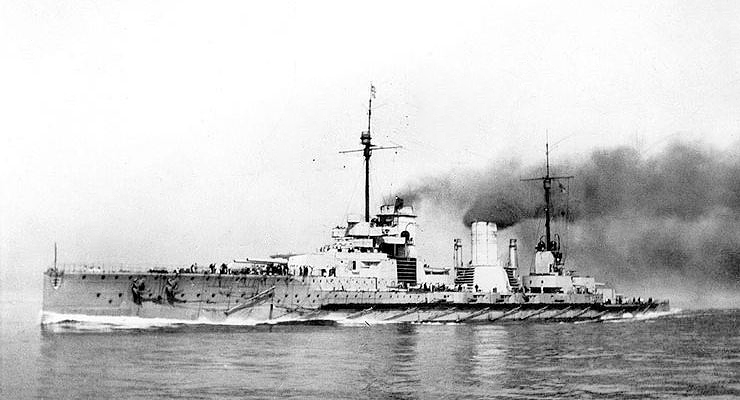
The German flagship, SMS Seydlitz

Admiral Hipper was awarded an Iron Cross but refused to wear it, feeling little had been accomplished. Although the results were not spectacular, German commanders were heartened by the ease with which Hipper had arrived and departed and were encouraged to try again. The lack of reaction from the British had been due partly to news that morning of a much more serious loss at the Battle of Coronel and because Admiral John Jellicoe, commander of the Grand Fleet, was on a train returning to his ships at the time of the raid. According to Winston Churchill, the First Lord of the Admiralty, the British could not believe there was nothing more to the raid than briefly shelling Yarmouth and were waiting for something else to happen.

== Orders of battle ==
=== Imperial German Navy ===
German ships
Name	Flag	Type	Notes
SMS Seydlitz	Imperial German Navy	Battlecruiser	Flagship
SMS Moltke	Imperial German Navy	Moltke-class battlecruiser	
SMS Von der Tann	Imperial German Navy	Battlecruiser	
SMS Blücher	Imperial German Navy	Armoured cruiser	
SMS Graudenz	Imperial German Navy	Graudenz-class cruiser	
SMS Kolberg	Imperial German Navy	Kolberg-class cruiser	
SMS Strassburg	Imperial German Navy	Magdeburg-class cruiser	Laid mines
SMS Stralsund	Imperial German Navy	Magdeburg-class cruiser	

=== Royal Navy ===
British ships
Name	Flag	Type	Notes
HMS Halcyon	Royal Navy	Dryad-class torpedo gunboat	Flagship, minesweeper conversion
HMS Lively	Royal Navy	B-class destroyer	
HMS Success	Royal Navy	B-class destroyer	
HMS Leopard	Royal Navy	C-class destroyer	
HMS D3	Royal Navy	British D-class submarine	
HMS D5	Royal Navy	British D-class submarine	Hit mine and sank
HMS E10	Royal Navy	British E-class submarine	

== See also ==
- Raid on Scarborough, Hartlepool and Whitby (1914)
- Bombardment of Yarmouth and Lowestoft (1916)

== Bibliography ==
- Churchill, W. S. C. (1923). The World Crisis, 1911–1914. Vol. I (3rd ed.). London: Thornton Butterworth. OCLC 769844622.
- Corbett, J. S. (2009) [1938]. Naval Operations. History of the Great War based on Official Documents. Vol. I (2nd repr. Imperial War Museum and Naval & Military Press ed.). London: Longmans, Green. ISBN 978-1-84342-489-5 – via Archive Foundation.
- Massie, R. (2004). Castles of Steel: Britain, Germany, and the Winning of the Great War at Sea. London: Jonathan Cape. ISBN 0-224-04092-8.
- Pollen, A. J. H. (1919). The British Navy in Battle. Garden City, NY: Doubleday. OCLC 710122 – via Archive Foundation.
