= HMS D5 =

Submarine of the Royal Navy

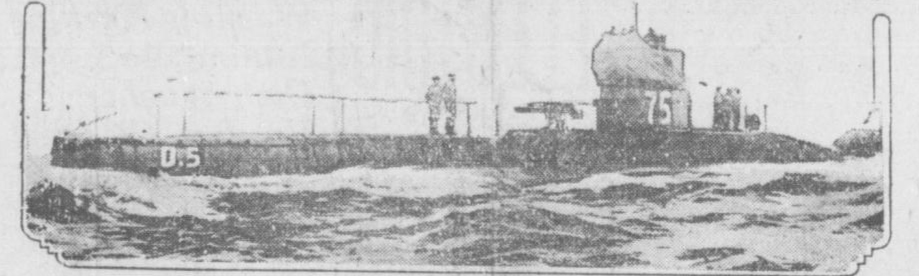
- HMS D5

History

United Kingdom
- Name: HMS D5
- Builder: Vickers Armstrong, Barrow-in-Furness
- Laid down: 23 February 1910
- Launched: 28 August 1911
- Commissioned: 19 February 1911
- Fate: Sunk, 3 November 1914

General characteristics
- Class & type: D-class submarine
- Displacement: 483 long tons (491 t) (surfaced); 595 long tons (605 t) (submerged)
- Length: 163 ft (50 m) (o/a)
- Beam: 13.6 ft (4.1 m) (o/a)
- Installed power: 1,750 hp (1,300 kW) (diesel engines); 550 hp (410 kW) (electric motors)
- Propulsion: 2 × diesel engines; 2 × electric motors; 2 × screws
- Speed: Surfaced: 14 kn (16 mph; 26 km/h); Submerged: 10 kn (12 mph; 19 km/h) (design); 9 kn (10 mph; 17 km/h) (service)
- Range: 2,500 nmi (2,900 mi; 4,600 km) at 10 kn (12 mph; 19 km/h); 45 nmi (52 mi; 83 km) at 5 kn (5.8 mph; 9.3 km/h)
- Complement: 25
- Armament: 3 × 18 inch (450 mm) torpedo tubes (2 forward, one aft)

HMS D5 was one of eight D-class submarines built for the Royal Navy during the first decade of the 20th century.

== Description ==
The D-class submarines were designed as improved and enlarged versions of the preceding C class, with diesel engines replacing the dangerous petrol engines used earlier. D3 and subsequent boats were slightly larger than the earlier boats. They had a length of 164 feet 7 inches (50.2 m) overall, a beam of 20 feet 5 inches (6.2 m) and a mean draught of 11 feet 5 inches (3.5 m). They displaced 495 long tons (503 t) on the surface and 620 long tons (630 t) submerged. The D-class submarines had a crew of 25 officers and ratings and were the first to adopt saddle tanks.

For surface running, the boats were powered by two 600-brake-horsepower (447 kW) diesels, each driving one propeller shaft. When submerged each propeller was driven by a 275-horsepower (205 kW) electric motor. They could reach 14 knots (26 km/h; 16 mph) on the surface and 9 knots (17 km/h; 10 mph) underwater. On the surface, the D class had a range of 2,500 nautical miles (4,600 km; 2,900 mi) at 10 knots (19 km/h; 12 mph).

The boats were armed with three 18-inch (45 cm) torpedo tubes, two in the bow and one in the stern. They carried one reload for each tube, a total of six torpedoes.

== Construction and career ==
D5 was one of six D-class submarines ordered from Vickers Armstrong under the 1909–1910 Naval Estimates and was laid down at Vickers' Barrow-in-Furness shipyard on 23 February 1910. She was launched on 28 August 1911 and completed on 19 January 1912.

On the outbreak of the First World War, D5, along with the rest of her class, was assigned to the 8th Submarine Flotilla. The Flotilla, including D5 was assigned to patrol in the east end of the English Channel during the passage of the British Expeditionary Force to France in early August. On 21 August 1914, D5 was on patrol west of Heligoland when she spotted a force of German warships that were carrying out a sortie into the North Sea against British fishing vessels. D5 fired two torpedoes at the German light cruiser Rostock, both of which missed.

D5 met her fate 2 nmi (3.7 km; 2.3 mi) south of South Cross Buoy off Great Yarmouth in the North Sea. She was sunk by a German mine laid by SMS Stralsund on 3 November 1914 after responding to a German attack on Yarmouth by cruisers. There were only five survivors, including her commanding officer, Lieutenant Commander Godfrey Herbert.

== Wreck ==
In 2016 Historic England commissioned an investigation of the wreck site by Wessex Archaeology as part of Archaeological Services in Relation to Marine Protection, a two-year project to assess a selection of underwater sites around the English coast. The investigation involved a geophysical survey over the location of the wreck site followed by a diver survey, which found that whilst the wreck of D5 meets the criteria for designation, it is sufficiently buried as to not be at risk. The decision was ultimately made not to designate the wreck at that time.
