= HMS Halcyon (1894) =

Gunboat of the Royal Navy

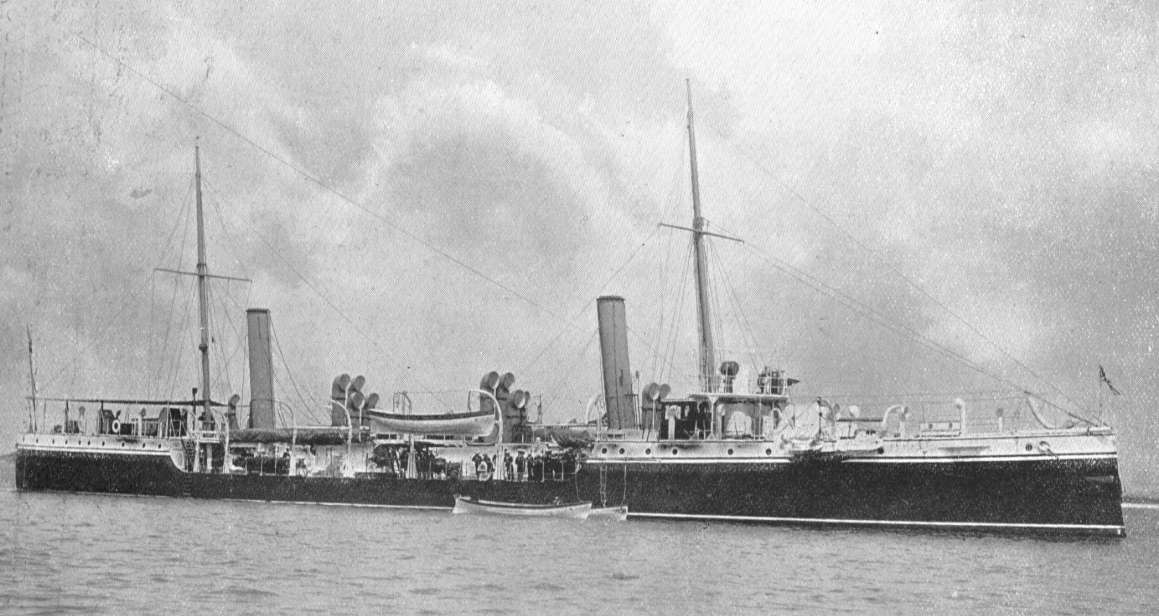
- Halcyon

History

United Kingdom
- Name: Halcyon
- Builder: Devonport Dockyard
- Laid down: 2 January 1893
- Launched: 6 April 1894
- Commissioned: 16 May 1895
- Fate: Sold for breaking on 6 November 1919

General characteristics
- Class & type: Dryad-class torpedo gunboat
- Displacement: 1,070 tons
- Length: 262 ft 6 in (80.0 m)
- Beam: 30 ft 6 in (9.3 m)
- Draught: 13 ft (4.0 m)
- Installed power: 6,000 ihp (4,500 kW)
- Propulsion: 2 × 3-cylinder vertical triple-expansion steam engines; Locomotive boilers; Twin screws
- Speed: 19 kn (35 km/h)
- Complement: 120
- Armament: 2 × QF 4.7-inch (12 cm) guns; 4 × 6-pounder; 1 × Nordenfelt machine gun; 5 × 18-inch torpedo tubes; On conversion to a minesweeper in 1914 two torpedo tubes were removed

The third HMS Halcyon was a Dryad-class torpedo gunboat of the Royal Navy. Once described as "perhaps the smallest and least formidable vessel that ever crept into the 'Navy List'", she was launched in 1894 and was put up for sale before World War I. She was recommissioned in 1913, was converted to a minesweeper and served under the orders of the Admiral Commanding Coast Guard and Reserves. She was sold for breaking in 1919.

== Design ==
Ordered under the Naval Defence Act of 1889, which established the "Two-Power Standard", the class was contemporary with the first torpedo boat destroyers. With a length overall of 262 ft 6 in (80.01 m), a beam of 30 ft 6 in (9.30 m) and a displacement of 1,070 tons, these torpedo gunboats were not small ships by the standard of the time; they were larger than the majority of World War I destroyers. Halcyon was engined by Hawthorn Leslie and Company with two sets of vertical triple-expansion steam engines, two locomotive-type boilers, and twin screws. Halcyon produced 6,000 indicated horsepower (4,500 kW), nearly twice the power of the rest of her class. She was capable of 19 or 20 knots (37 km/h). She carried between 100 and 160 tons of coal and was manned by 120 sailors and officers.

== Armament ==
The armament when built comprised two QF 4.7-inch (12 cm) guns, four 6-pounder guns and a single 5-barrelled Nordenfelt machine gun. Her primary weapon was five 18-inch (450 mm) torpedo tubes, (Note: British "18 inch" torpedoes were 17.72 inches (45.0 cm) in diameter) with two reloads. On conversion to a minesweeper in 1914 two of the five torpedoes were removed.

== Construction ==
Halcyon was laid down at Devonport Dockyard on 2 January 1893 and launched on 6 April 1894.

== Operational history ==
=== Naval review of 1897 ===
On 26 June 1897 Halcyon was present at the Fleet Review at Spithead in celebration of Queen Victoria's Diamond Jubilee.

=== Mediterranean station ===
HMS Halcyon was commissioned to serve at the Mediterranean Station by Commander Scott W. A. Hamilton Gray in March 1898. She was stationed at Souda Bay in early March 1900, but later the same month left for Port Said to temporary relieve HMS Rupert as coast defence ship. In May 1901 she left the Mediterranean and paid off at Devonport, to be placed in the Fleet Reserve for refitting.

=== Pre-war service ===
Although being offered for sale, she was recommissioned with a new crew from the Chatham Depot by Commander A.A. Ellison, R.N., at Sheerness on 5 July 1913, to do duty as Senior Naval Officer’s Ship, North Sea Fisheries, under the orders of the Admiral Commanding Coast Guard and Reserves.

=== World War I service ===
She was involved in the Raid on Yarmouth on 3 November 1914, when she was surprised by enemy cruisers, whom she challenged, and who responded shortly after 7:00 a.m. with gunfire.

Halcyon, perhaps the smallest and least formidable vessel that ever crept into the ‘Navy List’ [sic], engaged the enemy imperturbably when they fled, losing one man from a fragment of shell, though practically unhurt herself. Private letters speak of salvoes falling short and over in the most disconcerting manner, and of the ship being so drenched with water as to be in danger of foundering.”

On 29 July 1917, Halcyon spotted a periscope near the Smiths Knoll buoy east of Yarmouth, and carried out a ramming attack, followed by dropping two depth charges. Halcyon was credited with sinking the submarine, UB-27.

== Disposal ==
She was sold to J H Lee of Dover for breaking on 6 November 1919.

== Bibliography ==
- Brown, Les (2023). Royal Navy Torpedo Vessels. Barnsley, UK: Seaforth Publishing. ISBN 978-1-3990-2285-9.
- Corbett, Julian S. (1920). History of the Great War: Naval Operations: Volume I: To the Battle of the Falklands. London: Longmans, Green & Co.
- Corbett, Julian S. (1920). History of the Great War: Naval Operations: Volume II. London: Longmans, Green & Co.
- Grant, Robert M. (1964). U-Boats Destroyed: The Effects of Anti Submarine Warfare 1914–1918. London: Putnam.
- Lyon, David & Winfield, Rif (2004). The Sail and Steam Navy List: All the Ships of the Royal Navy 1815–1889. Chatham Publishing. ISBN 978-1-86176-032-6. OCLC 52620555.
