= Southern Bight =

Southern end of the North Sea

Coordinates: 52°04′02″N 02°51′02″E

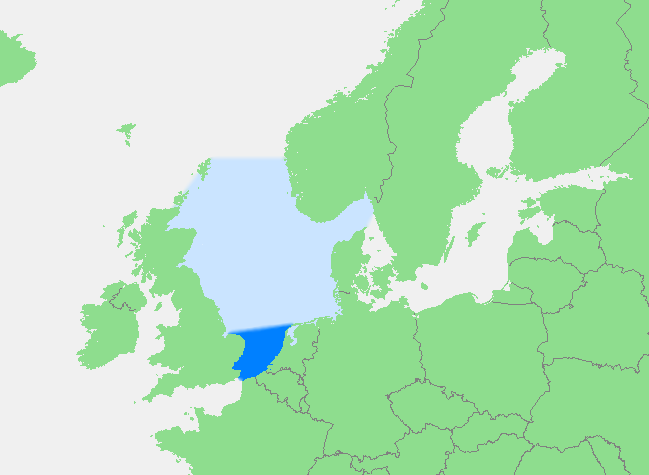
Location of the Southern Bight

Southern Bight

The Southern Bight — also known as the Flanders Bight, and (in Dutch) the Hoofden — is the southernmost bight of the North Sea. It is bounded by the coasts of the Netherlands, Belgium, France, and Great Britain, and lies to the southwest of the German Bight and the Wadden Sea. The Southern Bight is generally delimited in the north by a roughly straight line between The Wash and the West Frisian Islands running south of the Dogger Bank (a large, shallow section of the North Sea) and the Outer Silver Pit, a deep water channel south of the Dogger Bank. It corresponds to sea area Thames and the northern part of sea area Dover.

There are many sand banks in the Southern Bight. From the Strait of Dover to the Norfolk Banks there is a deep channel, wherein the water is about 30 metres deep or deeper. At the end of the English Channel, this depth increases to about 100 metres.

The North Sea as a whole has characteristics which are similar to those of the Atlantic Ocean, whereas the Southern Bight has hydrography characteristics which most resemble those of the English Channel, and the inputs from various European rivers. The bight's four main river sources are the Rhine, Meuse, Scheldt and the Thames, but it is also impacted by the Ems, Elbe, and Humber.

== See also ==
- Atlantic Ocean
- North Sea
- Wadden Sea
