= SMS Regensburg =

Light cruiser of the German Imperial Navy

Coordinates: 47.7255°N 3.3692°W

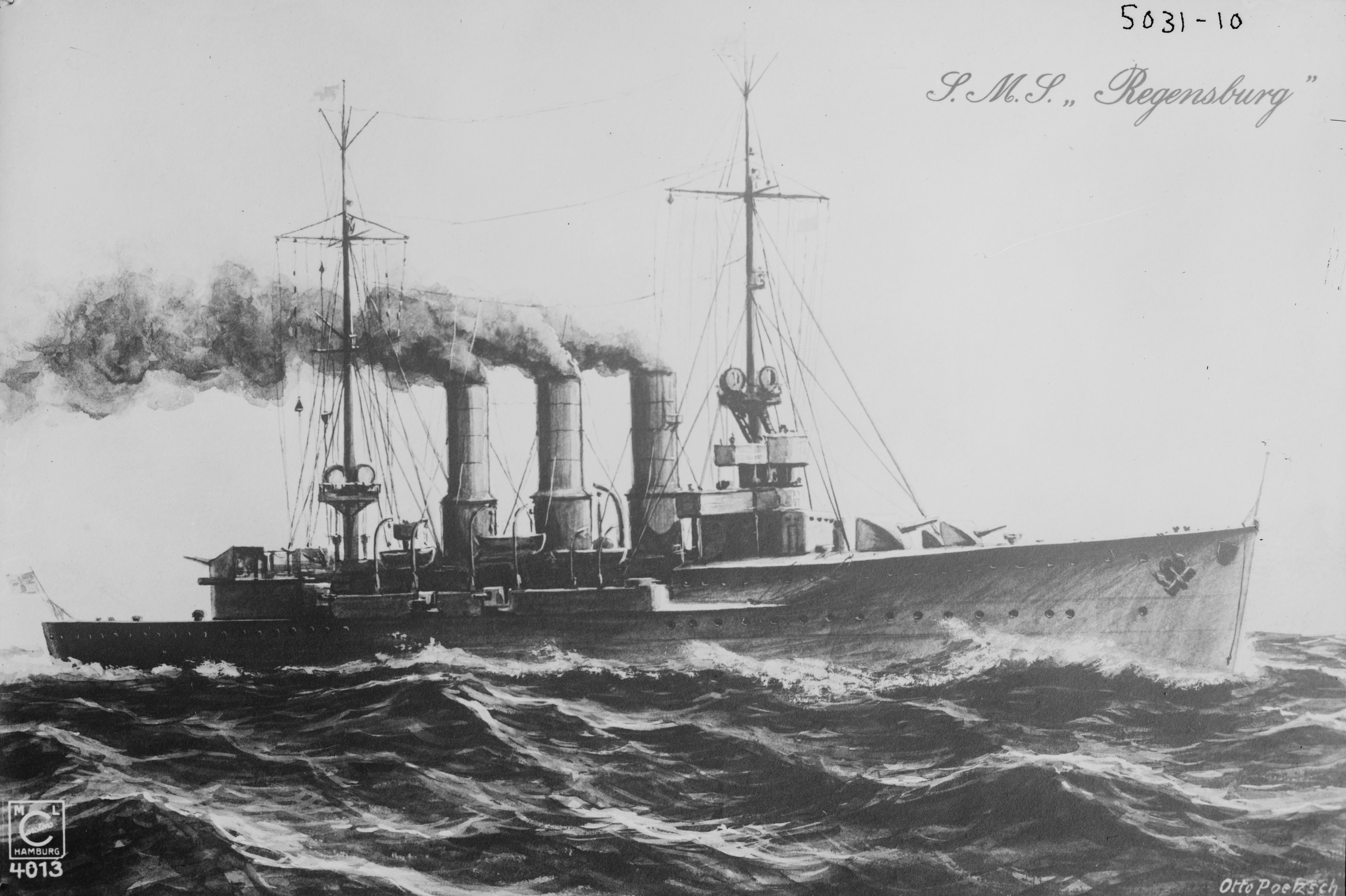
- Postcard depicting a sketch of SMS Regensburg

History

German Empire
- Name: Regenseburg
- Namesake: City of Regensburg
- Builder: AG Weser, Bremen
- Laid down: 14 November 1912
- Launched: 25 April 1914
- Commissioned: 3 January 1915
- Stricken: 10 March 1920
- Fate: Ceded to France

France
- Name: Strasbourg
- Namesake: City of Strasbourg
- Acquired: 4 June 1920
- Commissioned: 1922
- Decommissioned: 1929
- Out of service: 14 June 1936
- Fate: Scuttled in Lorient, 1944

General characteristics
- Class & type: Graudenz-class cruiser
- Displacement: Normal: 4,912 t (4,834 long tons); Full load: 6,382 t (6,281 long tons)
- Length: 142.70 m (468 ft 2 in)
- Beam: 13.80 m (45 ft 3 in)
- Draft: 5.75 m (18 ft 10 in)
- Installed power: 12 × water-tube boilers; 26,000 shp (19,000 kW)
- Propulsion: 2 × steam turbines; 2 × screw propellers
- Speed: 27.5 kn (50.9 km/h; 31.6 mph)
- Range: 5,500 nmi (10,200 km; 6,300 mi) at 12 knots (22 km/h; 14 mph)
- Crew: 21 officer; 364 enlisted men
- Armament: As built: 12 × 10.5 cm (4.1 in) SK L/45 guns; 2 × 50 cm torpedo tubes; After refit: 7 × 15 cm SK L/45 guns; 2 × 8.8 cm (3.5 in) SK L/45 anti-aircraft guns; 4 × 50 cm torpedo tubes; 120 mines
- Armor: Belt: 60 mm (2.4 in); Deck: 60 mm; Conning tower: 100 mm (3.9 in)

SMS Regensburg was a light cruiser of the Graudenz class built by the German Kaiserliche Marine (Imperial Navy). She had one sister ship, SMS Graudenz. The ship was built by the AG Weser shipyard in Bremen, laid down in 1912, launched in April 1914, and commissioned into active service in January 1915. She was named for the German town of Regensburg. The ship was armed with a main battery of twelve 10.5 cm SK L/45 guns and had a top speed of 27.5 knots (50.9 km/h; 31.6 mph), though in 1917 she was rearmed with seven 15 cm SK L/45 guns.

Regensburg served in the reconnaissance forces of the High Seas Fleet during World War I. She saw significant action at the Battle of Jutland on 31 May – 1 June 1916, where she served as the leader of the torpedo boat flotillas that screened for the I Scouting Group battlecruisers. After the end of the war, she was ceded to France in 1920 and renamed Strasbourg. In 1928 she took part in the Arctic rescue operations searching for the Airship Italia. Removed from service in 1936, she was used as a barracks ship in Lorient until 1944, when she was seized by the Germans and scuttled in the harbor to protect the U-boat pens there.

== Design ==
SMS Regensburg in her configuration of 1918 (Note: The bow shape in this drawing is incorrect, however; the Graudenz-class cruisers had a straight stem, not a ram bow.)

The two Graudenz-class cruisers were designed during the negotiations over the 1912 amendment to the Naval Law, which forced compromises to keep costs down. They were largely repeats of the preceding Karlsruhe class, with several minor changes. These included removing a pair of boilers (but retaining the same top speed), taller masts (to allow the ships to serve as flotilla leaders), and the introduction of a superfiring arrangement of the aft guns.

Regensburg was 142.7 meters (468 ft) long overall and had a beam of 13.8 m (45 ft) and a draft of 5.75 m (18.9 ft) forward. She displaced 6,382 t (6,281 long tons) at full load. The ship had a fairly small superstructure that consisted of a conning tower. Her hull had a long forecastle that extended for the first third of the ship, stepping down to main deck level just aft of the conning tower. She was fitted with a pair of pole masts that were taller than standard masts, which allowed them to be used to send wireless telegraph signals, a requirement of their use as flotilla leaders. The ship had a crew of 21 officers and 364 enlisted men.

Her propulsion system consisted of two sets of Marine steam turbines driving two 3.5-meter (11 ft) propellers. They were rated to provide 26,000 shaft horsepower (19,000 kW). These were powered by ten coal-fired Marine-type water-tube boilers and two oil-fired double-ended boilers, which were vented through three funnels located amidships. These gave the ship a top speed of 27.5 knots (50.9 km/h; 31.6 mph). Regensburg carried 1,280 t (1,260 long tons) of coal, and an additional 375 t (369 long tons) of oil that gave her a range of approximately 5,500 nautical miles (10,200 km; 6,300 mi) at 12 knots (22 km/h; 14 mph).

The ship was armed with twelve 10.5 cm (4.1 in) SK L/45 guns in single pedestal mounts. Two were placed side by side forward on the forecastle, eight were located amidships, four on either side, and two in a superfiring pair aft. The guns had a maximum elevation of 30 degrees, which allowed them to engage targets out to 12,700 m (41,700 ft). These were later replaced with seven 15 cm (5.9 in) SK L/45 guns and two 8.8 cm (3.5 in) SK L/45 anti-aircraft guns. She was also equipped with a pair of 50 cm (19.7 in) torpedo tubes with five torpedoes submerged in the hull on the broadside. Four deck-mounted launchers were added when the gun armament was upgraded, and the submerged tubes were removed. She could also carry 120 mines.

The ship was protected by a waterline armor belt that was 60 mm (2.4 in) thick amidships. Protection for the ship's internals was reinforced with a curved armor deck that was 60 mm thick; the deck sloped downward at the sides and connected to the bottom edge of the belt armor. The conning tower had 100 mm (3.9 in) thick sides.

== Service history ==
Regensburg was ordered in May 1912 under the contract name "Ersatz Irene", (Note: German warships were ordered under provisional names. Additions to the fleet were given a single letter; ships intended to replace older or lost vessels were ordered as "Ersatz (name of the ship to be replaced)".) and was laid down at the AG Weser shipyard in Bremen on 14 November 1912. She was launched on 25 April 1914; the mayor of Regensburg, Hofrat Josef Bleyer, christened the ship. It was planned that the ship would replace the cruiser Dresden when she was completed, but the outbreak of World War I in July 1914 interrupted those plans. Completion of the ship was accelerated after the start of the conflict, and she was commissioned to begin sea trials on 3 January 1915. The ship was initially commanded by Fregattenkapitän (FK—Frigate Captain) Ernst Ewers, until the end of her trials on 10 March, when Kapitän zur See (KzS—Captain at Sea) Widenmann replaced him. That day, the ship was assigned to II Scouting Group While the ship was still undergoing trials, Captain Hans Zenker proposed that Regensburg and the liner Cap Polonio—which was to be armed with 15 cm guns—should be sent out into the Atlantic to replace the commerce raiding cruisers that had been destroyed in the early months of the war. The fleet commander, Admiral Friedrich von Ingenohl, argued the ships would eventually be sunk as well, and that any possible successes for the raiders would not equal the loss of a modern light cruiser or a large passenger liner. The suggested plan was therefore abandoned.

=== 1915–1916 ===
On 21 March, she and the rest of II Scouting Group moved to the Baltic, where they took part in operations to defend the German town of Memel over the following two days. They bombarded Russian positions near Polangen and Papensee; the operation lasted until the 24th. While the rest of II Scouting Group returned to the North Sea, Regensburg sailed to Kiel, where the remaining work to complete fitting out was done at the Kaiserliche Werft (Imperial Shipyard) there. She joined the rest of her unit at Wilhelmshaven, the main German naval base on the North Sea on 4 May; over the following months, she participated in the routine of wartime operations, which included patrols in the German Bight, covering mine-laying operations, and reconnaissance patrols into the North Sea to search for British warships. The first of these took place from 17 to 19 May, and saw Regensburg lay a minefield off the Dogger Bank in the central North Sea.

On 3 August 1915, she and significant portions of the fleet were transferred to the Baltic for the Battle of the Gulf of Riga, a major operation to clear the Gulf of Riga of Russian naval forces. Eight dreadnoughts and three battlecruisers from the High Seas Fleet were detached for the operation. During the first attempt to penetrate the Gulf of Riga, Regensburg and the rest of II Scouting Group formed part of the covering group that was to prevent any Russian attempt to counter-attack from further east in the Baltic. The ships and the battlecruisers of I Scouting Group carried out a sweep into the Gulf of Finland to search for Russian warships that might intervene in the operation. On 25 August, Regensburg and the cruiser Pillau bombarded Russian positions on the island of Dagö, including the lighthouse in St. Andreasberg and the signal station on Cap Ristna. Two days later, Regensburg returned to the North Sea.

On 11–12 September, Regensburg participated in another mine-laying operation, this time off Texel. The commander of II Scouting Group, Konteradmiral (KAdm–Rear Admiral) Friedrich Boedicker, transferred to Regensburg on 14 October, making her the group flagship. She joined the rest of the High Seas Fleet for a sweep into the North Sea on 23 October, which was cancelled the following day due to bad weather. Late in the year, the German navy had begun patrolling for merchant shipping between Britain and Scandinavia in the Skagerrak and the Kattegat, initially using torpedo-boat flotillas. Three of these operations failed to locate any ships, and so on 16 December, Regensburg and the rest of II Scouting Group sortied to make a sweep for shipping in the area. The ships were joined by II, VI, and IX Torpedo-boat Flotillas, which were led by the cruiser Rostock. This attempt to interdict British shipping also failed, and the ships returned to Kiel on 18 December, having found only a single merchant vessel. The cruisers then passed through the Kaiser Wilhelm Canal to return to the North Sea.

Regensburg next went to sea on 5 March 1916 for the first fleet operation commanded by Vizeadmiral (Vice Admiral) Reinhard Scheer, which was in the direction of the Hoofden. The sweep lasted for two days and failed to locate any British ships. On 25 March, from the direction of Sylt, British seaplane carriers raided the zeppelin base at Tondern, prompting Regensburg and other vessels to sortie to try to intercept them before they withdrew. The Germans were at sea into 26 March, but failed to locate the British raiders. Another fleet patrol into the North Sea took place on 21–22 April, this time toward Horns Rev. On 23–24 April, she participated in the bombardment of Yarmouth and Lowestoft in company with I Scouting Group. During the operation, Kommodore (Commodore) Ludwig von Reuter temporarily took command of II Scouting Group, flying his flag aboard Regensburg. The cruisers briefly fought the British Harwich Force, but after the battlecruisers returned from bombarding Lowestoft, their gunfire dissuaded Rear Admiral Reginald Tyrwhitt from pursuit; the British quickly turned south and fled. The German ships arrived back in port on 25 April.

==== Battle of Jutland ====
Maps showing the maneuvers of the British (blue) and German (red) fleets on 30–31 May 1916

In May 1916, Scheer planned to lure a portion of the British fleet away from its bases and destroy it with the entire High Seas Fleet. For the planned operation, Regensburg, the flagship of Kommodore Paul Heinrich, was assigned to serve as the leader of the torpedo boat flotillas that screened for the battlecruisers of I Scouting Group. The squadron left the Jade roadstead at 02:00 on 31 May, bound for the waters of the Skagerrak. The main body of the fleet followed an hour and a half later. At around 15:30, the cruiser screens of I Scouting Group and the British 1st Battlecruiser Squadron engaged; Regensburg was on the disengaged side of the German formation, but steamed to reach the head of the line of battle. As she was moving into position, the opposing battlecruisers opened fire; Regensburg was some 2,200 yd (2,000 m) from the German battlecruisers, still on the disengaged side. Her crew noted that the British shells were falling well over their targets, which placed Regensburg in greater danger than the battlecruisers at which the British were aiming. By 17:10, Regensburg had reached the head of the line, and the battlecruiser HMS Tiger fired several salvos at her, mistaking her for a battlecruiser.

As the battlecruiser squadrons closed on each other, Regensburg ordered the torpedo boats to make a general attack on the British formation. The British had similarly ordered an attack with their destroyers, which led to a hard-fought battle at close range between the opposing destroyer forces, supported by light cruisers and the battlecruisers' secondary guns. Shortly after 19:00, Regensburg led an attack with several torpedo boats on the cruiser Canterbury and four destroyers. She disabled the destroyer Shark and then shifted fire to Canterbury, which turned away into the mist. By 20:15, the British and German main fleets had engaged, and Scheer sought a withdrawal; he therefore ordered I Scouting Group to charge the British line while the rest of the fleet turned away. This was in turn covered by a massed torpedo boat attack, which forced the British to turn away as well. Regensburg and her torpedo boats were ordered to join the attack, but I Scouting Group had passed in front of his ships, and he realized the British had turned away, which put them out of range of his torpedoes.

Having successfully disengaged, Scheer ordered Regensburg to organize three torpedo boat flotillas to make attacks on the British fleet during the night. At 21:10, Heinrich dispatched II Flotilla and XII Half-Flotilla from the rear of the German line to attack the British formation. In the night, the High Seas Fleet successfully passed behind the British fleet and reached Horns Reef by 04:00 on 1 June. At 09:45, Regensburg and three torpedo boats turned around to rendezvous with the torpedo boats carrying the crew of the scuttled battlecruiser Lützow. Regensburg took on 1,177 men from Lützow. In the course of the battle, Regensburg had fired 372 rounds of 10.5 cm ammunition and emerged completely unscathed.

=== Late-1916 – 1917 ===
The High Seas Fleet sortied again on 18 August for another raid on the British coast; this time Sunderland was to be attacked. Regensburg served as part of the screen for the main body. The raid resulted in the action of 19 August 1916, an inconclusive clash that left several ships on both sides damaged or sunk by submarines, but no direct fleet encounter. Regensburgh saw no action during the operation, which concluded two days later. On 29 September, Regensburg and several torpedo-boats swept north toward Terschelling, but failed to locate any British forces. She went to sea on 18 October for another fleet sweep into the German Bight, which led to a brief action the following day, an inconclusive sweep during which a British submarine torpedoed the cruiser München. The failure of the operation (coupled with the action of 19 August) convinced the German naval command to abandon its aggressive fleet strategy. The year's activities ended for Regensburg with another fruitless patrol out to the Fisher Bank on 27 December, in company with the cruisers Stralsund, Bremse, and Brummer, and the torpedo-boats of II, III, and VI Torpedo-boat Flotillas and the 14th Half-Flotilla.

On 23 January 1917, Regensburg sortied with II and IX Torpedo-boat Flotillas for a sweep to the east of Terschelling that lasted into the following day. The purpose of the operation was to distract the attention of British light forces while VI Torpedo-boat Flotilla moved to Flanders. The British nevertheless intercepted the flotilla, and Heinrich sailed east to come to their aid; the ships assisted the heavily damaged torpedo-boat S50 return to port. Heinrich hauled his flag down from Regensburg on 12 March, ending her service as a flagship for torpedo-boat flotillas. Two days later, she was also transferred from II to IV Scouting Group, but on 16 March, the ship was dry docked at Kaiserliche Werft in Kiel for a thorough overhaul and replacement of her main battery with 15 cm (5.9 in) guns. This work lasted until 15 July. After returning to service on, Regensburg became the IV Scouting Group flagship under Kommodore Max Hahn on 7 August. The unit spent most of the year conducting local, defensive patrols in the North Sea. In September, FK Wolfgang Wegener took command of the ship.

On 28 October, IV Scouting Group, which also included the cruisers Stralsund and Pillau, steamed to Pillau, arriving on the 30th. Later that day, Regensburg moved to Libau. They were tasked with replacing the heavy units of the fleet that had just completed Operation Albion, the conquest of the islands in the Gulf of Riga, along with the battleships of I Battle Squadron. The risk of mines that had come loose in a recent storm, however, prompted the naval command to cancel the mission, and Regensburg and the rest of IV Scouting Group was ordered to return to the North Sea on 31 October. Regensburg remained in Libau until 4 November, when she departed to return to Wilhelmshaven, arriving three days later. She thereafter resumed the defensive patrols in German waters for the rest of the year.

=== 1918 ===
Regensburg took part in a series of operations in the North Sea in April 1918. The first took place from 9 to 11 April, and involved covering the cruisers Arcona and Bremse while they laid a minefield off Lister. Next, she covered minesweepers off Terschelling from 19 to 20 April. The last, which also proved to be the final major fleet operation of the war, took place from 23 to 27 April, and involved the bulk of the High Seas Fleet. German attacks on shipping between Britain and Norway, which had begun in late 1917, prompted the Grand Fleet to begin escorting convoys with a detached battle squadron. This decision presented the Germans with opportunity for which they had been waiting the entire war: a portion of the numerically stronger Grand Fleet was separated and could be isolated and destroyed. Hipper planned the operation: I Scouting Group, along with light cruisers and destroyers, would attack one of the large convoys while the rest of the High Seas Fleet would stand by, ready to attack the British battle squadron when it intervened. At 05:00 on 23 April 1918, the German fleet—including Regensburg—departed from the Schillig roadstead. Hipper, aboard the battleship Baden, ordered wireless transmissions be kept to a minimum, to prevent radio intercepts by British intelligence. During the voyage north, the battlecruiser Moltke suffered a machinery breakdown, and she had to be towed back to port. Despite this setback, Hipper continued northward. By 14:00, Hipper's force had crossed the convoy route several times but had found nothing. At 14:10, Hipper turned his ships southward. By 18:37, the German fleet had made it back to the defensive minefields surrounding their bases.

On 27 April, Regensburg was sent to the Baltic, and on 14 May, she laid a minefield in the Skagerrak. She returned to the North Sea on 29 May. She was then moved to the Joh. C. Tecklenborg shipyard in Geestemünde for periodic repairs that lasted until 13 August. During that time, the IV Scouting Group commander, Kommodore Johannes von Karpf, temporarily transferred his flag to Stralsund. On 16 August, Regensburg and the rest of IV Scouting Group were assigned to Operation Schlußstein, then still being planned. The operation was to seize the Russian city of St. Petersburg to begin a ground campaign against British forces that had intervened in northern Russia during the Russian Civil War. From then to 1 October, while preparations were still underway, the ship visited numerous ports in the eastern Baltic, including in Finland. By that time, the German military position in World War I had begun to collapse, and Operation Schlußstein was cancelled on 27 September. IV Scouting Group thereafter returned to the North Sea.

IV Scouting Group was to participate in a final, climactic attack by the High Seas Fleet. Admirals Scheer and Hipper intended to inflict as much damage as possible on the British navy, in order to secure a better bargaining position for Germany, whatever the cost to the fleet. On the morning of 27 October, days before the operation was scheduled to begin, Karpf ordered Regensburg's crew to take on a full load of coal and oil. One division of sailors refused to work and a watch from the engine room personnel changed into their shore-going uniforms and refused to work as well. The ship's First Lieutenant arrested the ringleader of the strike, after which the crew returned to work. On the morning of 29 October 1918, the order was given to sail from Wilhelmshaven the following day. Starting on the night of 29 October, sailors on the battleship Thüringen and then on several other battleships mutinied. The unrest ultimately forced Hipper and Scheer to cancel the operation.

As the mutinies spread, Karpf ordered his ships to be dispersed among the smaller ports in the Baltic, to prevent their crews from being influenced by the mutineers aboard the larger vessels. Regensburg and Bremse initially sailed to Glücksburg, from which Regensburg sailed on alone to Swinemünde, arriving on 7 November. That night, false reports of torpedo boats crewed by Communist revolutionaries had sailed to attack his ships reached Karpf. He ordered his ships to be laid up; the confidential materials carried aboard were destroyed and their ammunition magazines were flooded. When the fleet command learned of the incident, they replaced Karpf with Kommodore Heinrich Rohardt, who set about restoring the ships to seagoing condition. During this process, IV Scouting Group moved to Stettin. The abdication of Kaiser Wilhelm II on 9 November, however, which indicated to Rohardt that his ships could no longer fly the Imperial ensign. He therefore placed Regensburg and Brummer out of commission.

=== Postwar service ===
Korvettenkapitän (Corvette Captain) Albert Gayer arrived in Stettin to serve as Regensburg's commander, but he had few officers and no crew. The ship was nevertheless recommissioned on 17 November, and the same day she departed for Wilhelmshaven, stopping in Kiel on the way on 18 November. The ship was then docked for repairs and to have her armament removed in line with the armistice requirements that ended the fighting in World War I. On 2 December, the staff for the Commander of Reconnaissance Forces came aboard Regensburg, having temporarily been housed aboard the battleship Nassau. The following day, Regensburg met the British battleship HMS Hercules, which was carrying the Allied Armistice Commission, off the Dogger Bank. She escorted the British ship to Kiel, arriving there two days later. Regensburg then sailed back to Wilhelmshaven, where on 10 December, she embarked KAdm Ernst Goette, who was Germany's representative to the Allied Armistice Commission. She took him to Kiel before returning to Wilhelmshaven on 18 December. During this period, on the 16th, the Reconnaissance Forces command was dissolved, and the former staff members left the ship.

On 7 January 1919, Regensburg escorted Baden, which hadn't been included on the initial list of ships to be interned at Scapa Flow, to that anchorage to join the rest of the German ships there. After arriving, she embarked part of Baden's crew and carried them back to Kiel, arriving on 12 January. She then embarked now-RAdm Reuter on 24 January to take him to Scapa Flow, so he could take command of the interned ships. She then sailed back to Kiel via the Skagerrak, encountering a severe storm that damaged her bridge. After reaching Kiel, officers and crewmen who were in excess of the number required to operate the ship were discharged. Over the next few months, she made several more trips to Scapa Flow (or to other ports in Britain), including one voyage from 4 to 11 April, during which she escorted the salvage vessel Vulkan dock ship Cyclop; the former sank while in transit on 6 April. Regensburg and Cyclop arrived in Harwich on 9 April, after which Regensburg carried Cyclop's crew home. In another such voyage from 8 to 13 May, she had to assist with recovering a floating dry dock that had come loose while it was being towed to Britain. She towed another dry dock to Harwich from 23 May to 2 June.

During 1919, as the government reorganized the navy into what would become the Reichsmarine, the fleet commands were disbanded and replaced with regional commands. Regensburg was initially assigned to the Marinestation der Nordsee (North Sea Naval Station), and on 14 May she was inspected by KzS Victor Harder, the commander of the station. On 24 June, she was transferred to the Marinestation der Ostsee (Baltic Naval Station), which was commanded by now-KzS Ewers, who on 3 July made Regensburg his flagship. The ship visited Flensburg from 4 to 7 July. In early September, she had her guns re-installed, and on 8 October, she conducted her first round of shooting practice after the end of the war. The ship's postwar service in the German fleet was cut short by the scuttling of the German fleet at Scapa Flow, which had occurred in June 1919; the Allies demanded that other warships be surrendered as war prizes to replace the scuttled ships, and Regensburg was included in the list to be surrendered. She was inspected by the Allied Peace Commission on 24 January 1920, and she was thereafter decommissioned. The ship was still in Kiel during the Kapp Putsch in mid-March, and some of her crew were sent ashore to guard naval installations on 13–14 March and again on 18 March. Ewers, who had since been promoted to the rank of konteradmiral, left the ship two days later.

=== French service ===
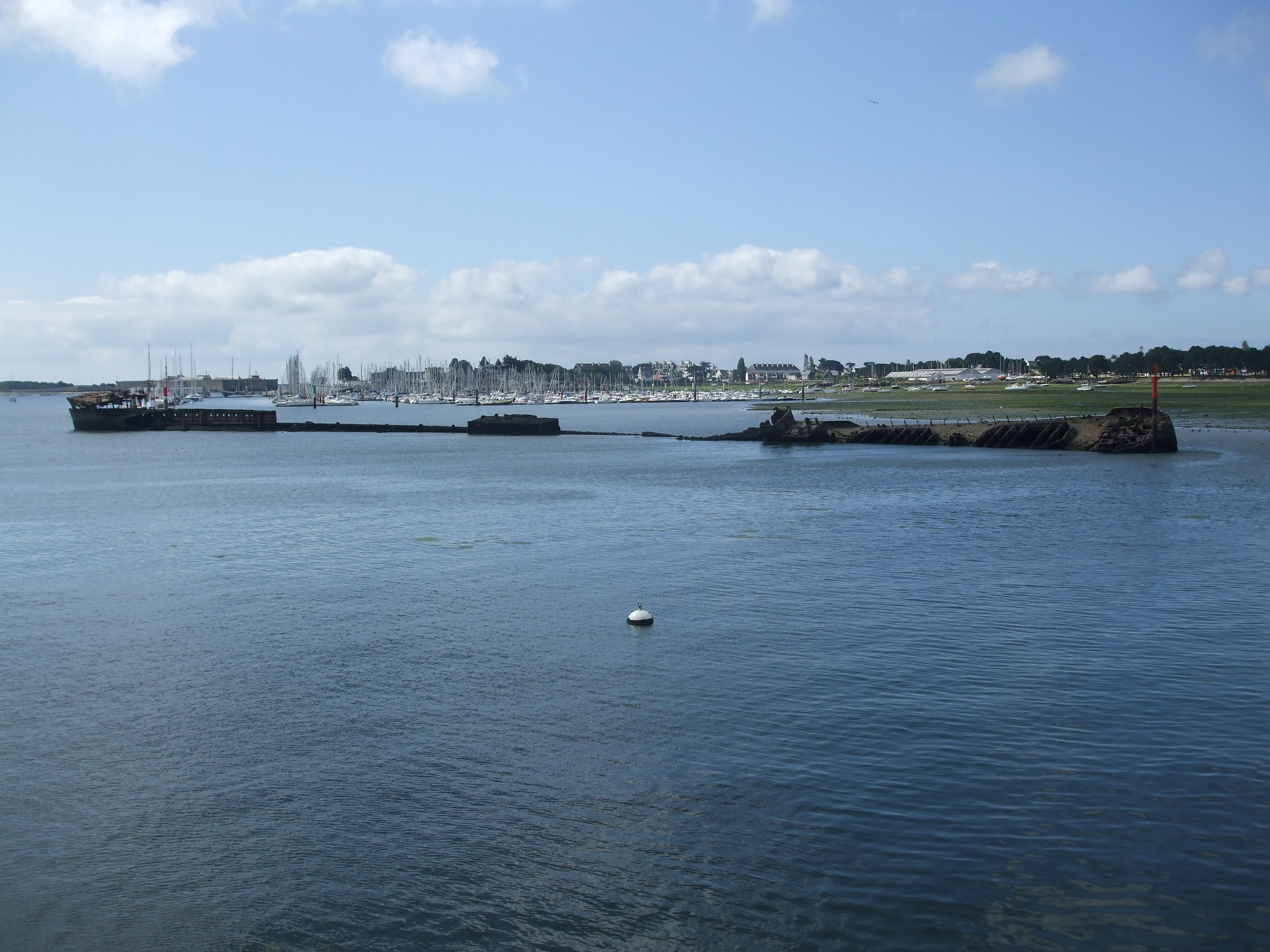
The wreck of Regensburg in the River Blavet, Lorient.

Regensburg was stricken from the naval register on 10 March 1920 (before the events of the Kapp Putsch) and placed out of service. On 1 June, the ship sailed for France and arrived in Cherbourg, France, on 5 June. The ship was surrendered to the Allies there and was transferred under the name "J" to the French Navy. She was renamed Strasbourg and served with the French fleet. After arriving in France in 1920, she received a new battery of French 75 mm (3 in) anti-aircraft guns in place of her 8.8 cm guns. The rear superfiring 15 cm gun was removed and the 75 mm guns were installed where the 15 cm gun had been. She was commissioned into the French fleet in 1922.

She was initially home-ported in Brest, until she was transferred to Toulon in 1923, where she remained for the next three years. Here, she served with the other ex-German cruisers Mulhouse and Metz and the ex-Austro-Hungarian Thionville in the 3rd Light Division (which was renamed the 2nd Light division in December 1926). In 1925, she underwent a major overhaul, after which she made 26 kn (48 km/h; 30 mph) on speed trials. Strasbourg participated in the Rif War in the mid-1920s; on 7 September 1925, she and the battleship Paris and the cruiser Metz supported a landing of French troops in North Africa. The three ships provided heavy gunfire support to the landing troops. In early 1928, a major earthquake struck Corinth, Greece; Strassbourg was among the vessels sent to aid in the relief effort. The international effort provided assistance to 15,000 people.

Also in 1928, she assisted in the search effort for the wrecked airship Italia, which had crashed on the polar ice northeast of Svalbard. In addition, Roald Amundsen, who had also joined the search effort, went missing himself. Strassbourg arrived in Tromsø, Norway, on 19 June, to search for both Italia and Amundsen's aircraft. The ship's bow was not designed to operate in an Arctic environment, and so the crew had to continually fix wood planks to the hull to protect it from the ice. While refueling from the tanker Durance, Strassbourg took on two FBA 17 seaplanes to assist in the search effort. On 30 August, Strassbourg located one of the floats from Amundsen's aircraft, confirming the loss of the plane. The search effort was called off on 17 September, and Strassbourg returned to Brest by way of Reykjavík, arriving back in France by mid October. By that time, the 3rd Light Division had been transferred to the Atlantic.

In 1929, all of the ex-German and ex-Austro-Hungarian vessels were placed in reserve, since the first generation of post-war cruisers were entering service in the French fleet. Strasbourg and the other old ships were first stationed in Brest, but the other vessels were moved to the Landévennec in 1930. Her name was reused for the new battleship Strasbourg, so the old cruiser was renamed Strassbourg II in early 1934 and in November she, too, was transferred to Landévennec. She was towed to Lorient on 15 January 1936, where she was used as a depot ship for the 6th Destroyer Division, thereafter being stricken from the register on 14 June. After the Germans invaded France in 1940, they seized the ship and briefly considered restoring her to active service. Instead, the project was abandoned and the cruiser was subsequently used as a barracks ship in Lorient. She was moored next to the U-boat pens and rigged with barrage balloons and anti-torpedo nets to strengthen the defenses of the area. In 1944, she was scuttled in the harbor to protect the pens from torpedo attack. Her wreck remains in the harbor, and is visible at low tide.
