= Fritz Lüdecke =

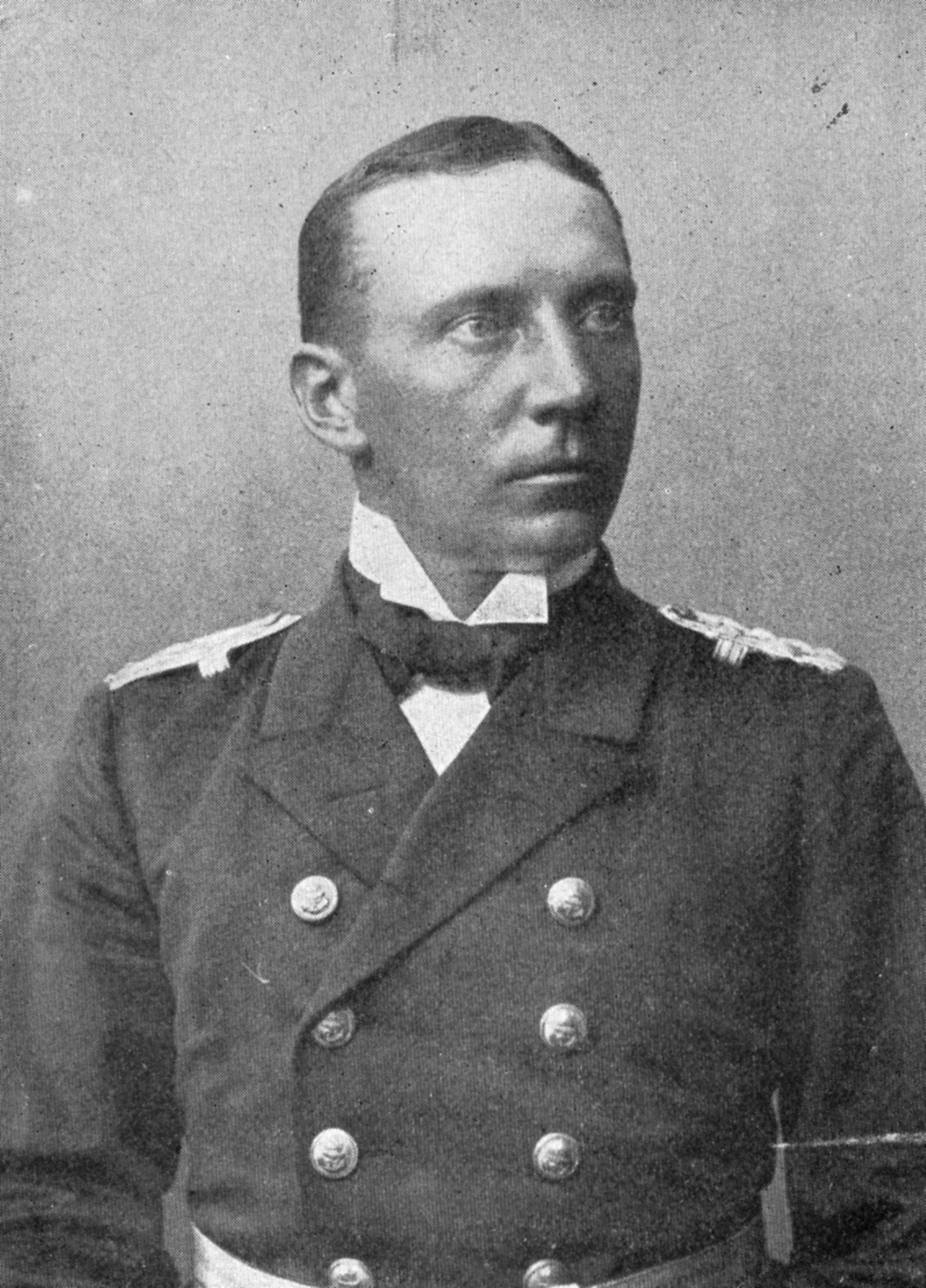
- Born: February 5, 1873; Dirschau, West Prussia, Prussia, Germany
- Died: February 22, 1931 (aged 58); Raisdorf, Schleswig-Holstein, Prussia, Germany
- Military career
- Allegiance: German Empire; Weimar Republic
- Branch: Imperial German Navy; Reichsmarine
- Service years: 1890 – 1920
- Rank: Rear Admiral
- Commands: SMS Karlsruhe; SMS Dresden
- Conflicts: World War I: Asian and Pacific theatre of World War I; Battle of Coronel; Battle of Más a Tierra

Emil Fritz Lüdecke was a German Rear Admiral who served the Imperial German Navy known for being the first commander of the SMS Karlsruhe as well as the last commander of the SMS Dresden.

== Biography ==
=== Early life ===
Fritz was born in Dirschau, present-day Poland, on February 5, 1873. He joined the Imperial German Navy in 1890 graduating in 1896 and served at Heliogard Fortress from 1896 to 1903, reaching the rank of Captain lieutenant specializing in artillery.

He was assigned as a gunnery officer aboard the SMS Wettin. In 1908 he attained the rank of Lieutenant Commander and served as administrative officer of the Navy's 1st Cruiser Squadron until 1910.

In 1912 he was promoted to Frigate Captain and appointed commander of the light cruiser SMS Dresden serving on missions in the Atlantic Ocean.

=== World War I ===
At the advent of World War I, between January and July 1914 he was appointed for a short period, commander of the new light cruiser SMS Karlsruhe and commissioned to repatriate German subjects from Mexico threatened by the ongoing Mexican Revolution. At the end of July while in Veracruz he was again reassigned to SMS Dresden and commissioned to transfer dictator Victoriano Huerta and his family to Kingston, Jamaica. He was relieved of repatriation duties by the cruiser SMS Nürnberg in Veracruz and was sent to Kiel, Germany for maintenance.

During this time, author Maria Teresa Parker described him as:

The old Dresden drivers knew their 'old man' very well. They judged him to be a quiet, very honorable man. He never spoke very much, but always made clear and precise decisions. Fritz Lüdecke made a taut, soldierly impression, without being remotely a 'commissaire' or a rider of the paragraph. In dealing with his subordinates he was conciliatory. His assessments in the 'management book' were extremely excellent.

While at sea in August 1914, he received word that Germany was at war and was sent to Qingdao, China for supplies and then to Easter Island where he joined Maximilian von Spee's fleet.

Von Spee's fleet set sail for Cape Horn to attack Port Stanley in the Falkland Islands. He took part in the Battle of Coronel where the Germans were victorious and was sent to Valparaíso for a week for communications and supplies.

On December 8, 1914, the German fleet was defeated in the Battle of the Falkland Islands by the British and the SMS Dresden was the only surviving German unit from the battle. The SMS Dresden began a journey through the Strait of Magellan and its channels to escape the hunt of the Dresden. Lüdecke's intention was to meet a friendly coal steamer, stock up and cross the Pacific Ocean in privateering. He finally set sail from his hideout at the Strait of Magellan in February 1915 and on February 27 he captured and sank an English barque known as Cornwall Castle off Concepción, whose crew was rescued by a Peruvian ship on March 4 and later sailed to the island of Más Afuera in search of the supplier arriving on March 9.

The SMS Dresden was finally surprised on March 14, 1915, by an English squadron at the Juan Fernández Islands. Lüdecke tried to parley and declare the ship interned without obtaining positive results, and after a brief fight, Lüdecke ordered the drilling and opening of valves to sink the cruiser.

=== Later years ===
He was interned along with the surviving crew on Isla Quiriquina in Talcahuano, Chile. In 1919, the German sailors who still remained and didn't want to stay at Chile were repatriated to Germany, including Lüdecke himself.

Lüdecke was assigned to the liquidation and administration of the remnants of the German fleet at Qingdao, China and retired in 1920 with the rank of rear admiral.

Lüdecke was married to Else Lüdecke, who published in 1915 a report on the activities of the cruiser in Mexico and in the World War however the couple had no children. Fritz Lüdecke died in 1931 at the age of 58 at Raisdorf.
