= Graudenz-class cruiser =

Class of light cruisers of the German Imperial Navy

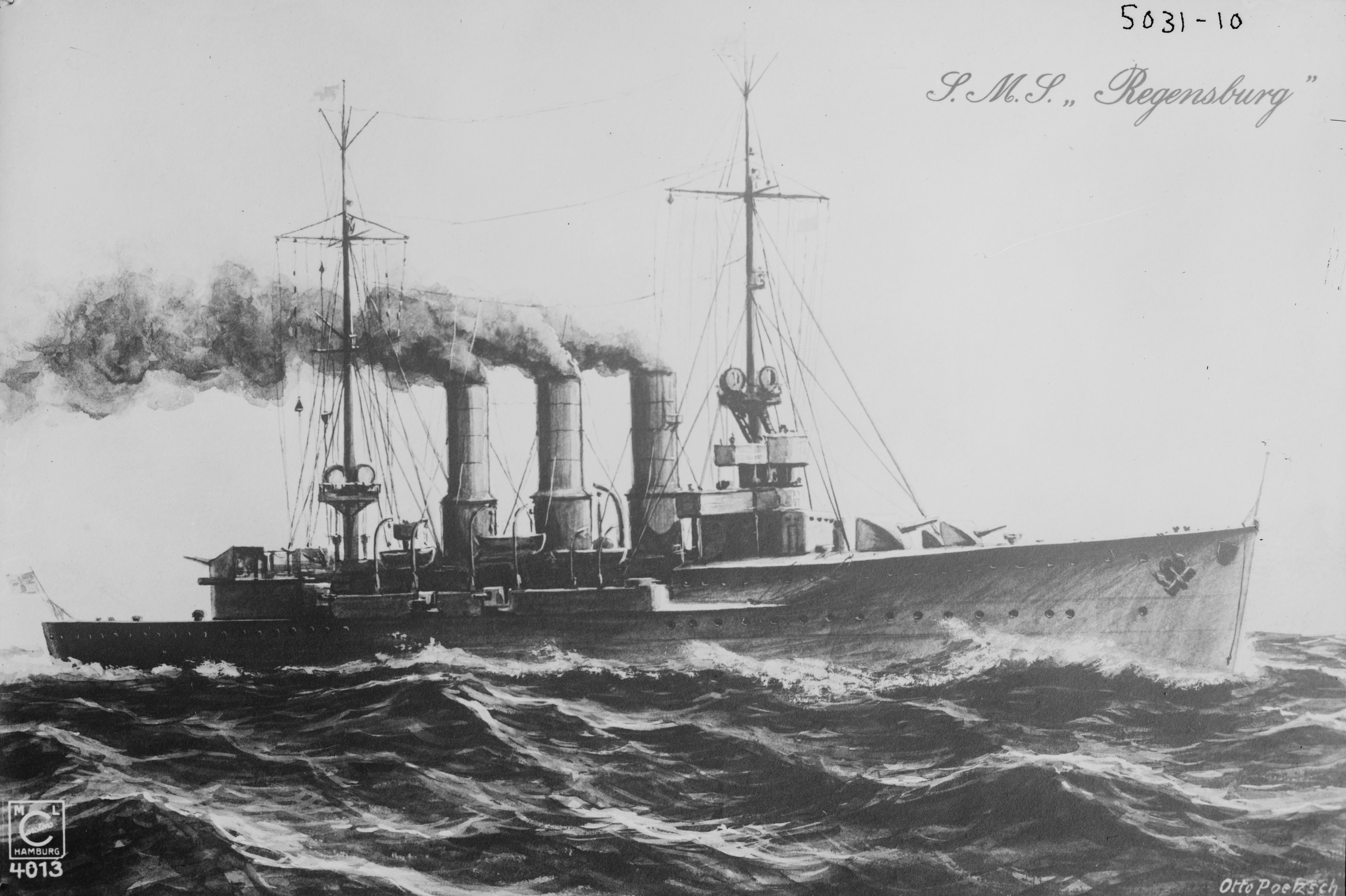
- Postcard depicting a sketch of SMS Regensburg

Class overview
- Builders: Kiel Navy Yard, AG Weser
- Operators: Imperial German Navy; French Navy; Regia Marina
- Preceded by: Karlsruhe class
- Succeeded by: Pillau class
- Built: 1912–1915
- In commission: 1914–1944
- Planned: 2
- Completed: 2
- Lost: 1
- Retired: 1

General characteristics
- Type: Light cruiser
- Displacement: Normal: 4,912 t (4,834 long tons); Full load: 6,382 t (6,281 long tons)
- Length: 142.70 m (468 ft 2 in)
- Beam: 13.80 m (45 ft 3 in)
- Draft: 5.75 m (18 ft 10 in)
- Installed power: 12 × water-tube boilers; 26,000 shp (19,000 kW)
- Propulsion: 2 × steam turbines; 2 × screw propellers
- Speed: 27.5 kn (50.9 km/h; 31.6 mph)
- Range: 5,500 nmi (10,200 km; 6,300 mi) at 12 knots (22 km/h; 14 mph)
- Crew: 21 officer; 364 enlisted men
- Armament: As built: 12 × 10.5 cm (4.1 in) SK L/45 guns; 2 × 50 cm torpedo tubes; After refit: 7 × 15 cm SK L/45 guns; 2 × 8.8 cm (3.5 in) SK L/45 anti-aircraft guns; 4 × 50 cm torpedo tubes; 120 mines
- Armor: Belt: 60 mm (2.4 in); Deck: 60 mm; Conning tower: 100 mm (3.9 in)

The Graudenz class of light cruisers was a class of two ships built for the Imperial German Navy. The class comprised SMS Graudenz and SMS Regensburg. The ships were both laid down in 1912, launched in October 1913 and April 1914, and commissioned in August 1914 and January 1915, respectively. They were armed with a main battery of twelve 10.5 cm (4.1 in) guns, though over the course of their careers, they were rearmed with seven more powerful 15 cm (5.9 in) guns. They displaced 6,382 t (6,281 long tons) at full load and were rated at a top speed of 27.5 knots (50.9 km/h; 31.6 mph)

Both ships saw extensive service during World War I, primarily in the reconnaissance forces of the High Seas Fleet. They participated in several raids on the British coast, screening for the battlecruisers of I Scouting Group. Regensburg saw heavy combat at the Battle of Jutland, the largest naval battle of the war; Graudenz had been damaged by a mine and was in dock for repairs at the time of the battle. Both were involved in the Wilhelmshaven mutiny at the end of the war. Following Germany's defeat, Graudenz was ceded to Italy and served as Ancona until 1937, when she was sold for scrap. Regensburg was transferred to France, where she served as Strasbourg until 1936, when she was converted into a barracks ship. She was ultimately scuttled in Lorient to protect the German U-boat pens there.

== Design ==
=== General characteristics and machinery ===
SMS Regensburg in her configuration of 1918 (Note: The bow shape in this drawing is incorrect, however; the Graudenz-class cruisers had a straight stem, not a ram bow.)

The ships of the Graudenz class were 139 meters (456 ft) long at the waterline and 142.70 m (468 ft 2 in) long overall. They had a beam of 13.80 m (45 ft 3 in) and a draft of 5.75 m (18 ft 10 in) forward and 6.08 m (19 ft 11 in) aft. They displaced 4,912 metric tons (4,834 long tons) as designed and 6,382 t (6,281 long tons) at full load. The ships' hulls were constructed with longitudinal steel frames and contained seventeen watertight compartments and a double bottom that extended for forty-seven percent of the length of the keel.

The two vessels each had a standard crew of twenty-one officers and 364 enlisted men. While serving as a second command flagship or a flotilla leader, they had an additional three officers and fourteen enlisted men for the commander's staff. They carried a number of smaller boats, including one picket boat, one barge, one cutter, two yawls, and two dinghies. The German Navy regarded the ships as good sea boats, with slight weather helm and gentle motion in a swell. The cruisers were maneuverable, but were slow going into a turn. Steering was controlled by a single large rudder. They lost speed only slightly in a head sea, but lost up to sixty percent in hard turns. They had a transverse metacentric height of .79 m (2 ft 7 in).

The ships' propulsion system consisted of two sets of Marine-type steam turbines, each of which drove a three-bladed screw 3.50 m (11 ft 6 in) in diameter. Each turbine was divided into its own engine room. They were designed to give 26,000 shaft horsepower (19,000 kW). These were powered by ten coal-fired Marine-type water-tube boilers and two oil-fired double-ended boilers, divided into four boiler rooms on the centerline. These gave the ship a top speed of 27.5 knots (50.9 km/h; 31.6 mph). The ships carried 1,280 t (1,260 long tons) of coal, and an additional 375 t (369 long tons) of fuel oil that gave them a range of approximately 5,500 nautical miles (10,200 km; 6,300 mi) at 12 knots (22 km/h; 14 mph). At 25 knots (46 km/h; 29 mph), the range fell considerably, to 1,000 nmi (1,900 km; 1,200 mi). Each ship had two turbo generators and one diesel generator with a combined output of 260 kilowatts (350 hp) at 220 Volts.

=== Armament and armor ===
The ships were armed with twelve 10.5 cm (4.1 in) SK L/45 guns in single pedestal mounts. Two were placed side by side forward on the forecastle, eight were located amidships, four on either side, and two in a superfiring pair aft. The guns had a maximum elevation of 30 degrees, which allowed them to engage targets out to 12,700 m (13,900 yd). These were replaced with seven 15 cm (5.9 in) SK L/45 guns and two 8.8 cm (3.5 in) SK L/45 anti-aircraft guns in 1916 for Graudenz and 1917 for Regensburg. They were also equipped with a pair of 50 cm (19.7 in) torpedo tubes with five torpedoes; the tubes were submerged in the hull on the broadside. Two deck-mounted launchers were added for Graudenz when the gun armament was upgraded; Regensburg had her submerged tubes removed and four deck mounted launchers installed. Both ships could also carry 120 mines.

The ships were protected by a waterline armored belt that was 60 mm (2.4 in) thick amidships and 18 mm (0.71 in) thick on the bow. The stern was unarmored. The deck was covered with up to 60 mm thick armor plate forward, 40 mm (1.6 in) thick amidships, and 20 mm (0.79 in) thick aft. Sloped armor 40 mm thick connected the deck and belt armor. The conning tower had 100 mm (3.9 in) thick sides and a 20 mm thick roof. A rangefinder was added with 30 mm (1.2 in) thick steel plating. The main battery guns had 50 mm (2 in) thick gun shields.

== Service history ==
=== Graudenz ===
Graudenz saw extensive service during World War I, including serving as part of the reconnaissance screen for the battlecruisers of I Scouting Group during the raid on Scarborough, Hartlepool and Whitby in December 1914. The ship also took part in the Battle of Dogger Bank in January 1915, and the Battle of the Gulf of Riga in August 1915. She had been damaged by a mine and was unable to participate in the Battle of Jutland in May 1916. She was assigned to the planned final operation of the High Seas Fleet in October 1918, weeks before the end of the war, but a major mutiny forced the cancellation of the plan. After the end of the war, the ship was ceded to Italy as a war prize and commissioned into the Italian Navy as Ancona; she remained in service until 1937 when she was stricken and broken up for scrap.

=== Regensburg ===
Regensburg served in the reconnaissance forces of the High Seas Fleet during World War I. She saw significant action at the Battle of Jutland on 31 May – 1 June 1916, where she served as the leader of the torpedo boat flotillas that screened for the I Scouting Group battlecruisers. Like Graudenz, Regensburg was to have participated in the final sortie of the German fleet at the end of the war, and was involved in the mutiny that forced the cancellation of the plan. After the end of the war, she was ceded to France in 1920 and renamed Strasbourg. In 1928 she took part in the Arctic rescue operations searching for the Airship Italia. Removed from service in 1936, she was used as a barracks ship in Lorient until 1944, when she was seized by the Germans and scuttled in the harbor to protect the U-boat pens there.
