= SMS Rostock =

Light cruiser of the German Imperial Navy

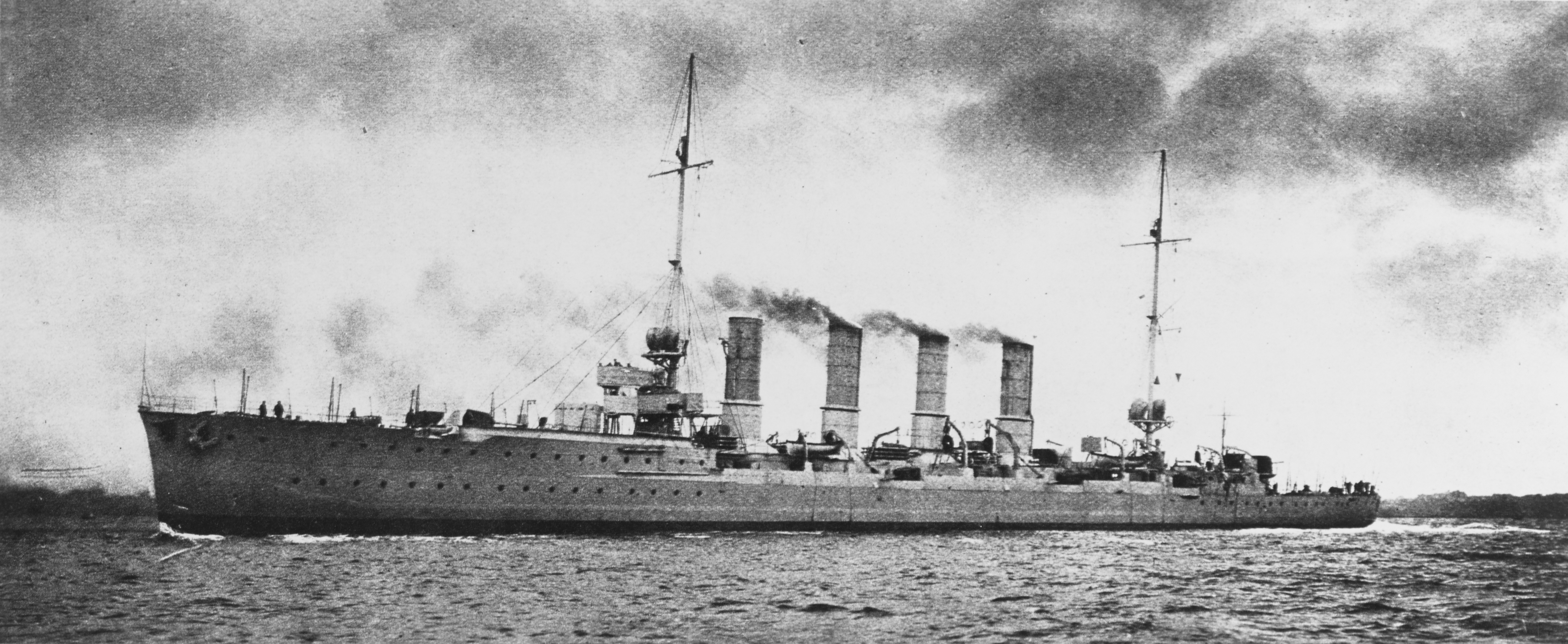
- SMS Rostock

History

German Empire
- Name: Rostock
- Namesake: Rostock
- Builder: Howaldtswerke, Kiel
- Laid down: 1911
- Launched: 12 November 1912
- Commissioned: 4 February 1914
- Fate: Scuttled at the Battle of Jutland, 1 June 1916

General characteristics
- Class & type: Karlsruhe-class cruiser
- Displacement: Normal: 4,900 t (4,800 long tons); Full load: 6,191 t (6,093 long tons)
- Length: 142.20 m (466 ft 6 in)
- Beam: 13.70 m (44 ft 11 in)
- Draft: 5.38 m (17 ft 8 in)
- Installed power: 14 × water-tube boilers; 26,000 shp (19,000 kW)
- Propulsion: 2 × steam turbines; 2 × screw propellers
- Speed: 29.3 kn (54.3 km/h; 33.7 mph)
- Complement: 18 officers; 355 enlisted men
- Armament: 12 × 10.5 cm (4.1 in) SK L/45 guns; 2 × 50 cm (19.7 in) torpedo tubes; 120 × mines
- Armor: Belt: 60 mm (2.4 in); Deck: 60 mm; Conning tower: 100 mm (3.9 in)

SMS Rostock was a light cruiser of the Karlsruhe class built by the German Kaiserliche Marine (Imperial Navy). She had one sister ship, SMS Karlsruhe; the ships were very similar to the previous Magdeburg-class cruisers. The ship was laid down in 1911, launched in November 1912, and completed by February 1914. Armed with twelve 10.5 cm SK L/45 guns, Rostock had a top speed of 28.5 knots (52.8 km/h; 32.8 mph) and displaced 6,191 t (6,093 long tons; 6,824 short tons) at full load.

Rostock served with the High Seas Fleet as a leader of torpedo boat flotillas for the duration of her career. She served with the screens for the battlecruisers of I Scouting Group during operations against the British coast and the Battle of Dogger Bank. She was assigned to the screen for the battle fleet during the Battle of Jutland on 31 May – 1 June 1916. She saw major action at Jutland and frequently engaged British light forces, culminating in her being torpedoed by destroyers shortly after midnight. She was taken under tow by German torpedo boats, but the following morning the cruiser HMS Dublin came upon the retreating ships. The Germans set scuttling charges aboard Rostock and took off the crew before Dublin arrived on the scene.

== Design ==
The design for the Karlsruhe class of light cruisers was based in large part on the preceding Magdeburg-class cruisers, incorporating fairly slight modifications in an effort to keep costs down. Some question was given to revising the armament, but all of the proposals to increase the number or size of the main battery would have resulted in considerable delays. The side belt armor was increased in height to improve the ships' resistance to enemy fire, and fuel oil was introduced as part of the propulsion system on an experimental basis. The class comprised two ships: Karlsruhe and Rostock; they were to be the final cruisers completed in peacetime.

Rostock was 142.2 meters (467 ft) long overall and had a beam of 13.7 m (45 ft) and a draft of 5.38 m (17.7 ft) forward. She displaced 4,900 metric tons (4,800 long tons; 5,400 short tons) normally and up to 6,191 t (6,093 long tons; 6,824 short tons) at full load. The ship had a short forecastle deck and a minimal superstructure that consisted primarily of a conning tower located on the forecastle. She was fitted with two pole masts with platforms for searchlights. Rostock had a crew of 18 officers and 355 enlisted men.

Her propulsion system consisted of two sets of Marine steam turbines driving two 3.5-meter (11 ft) propellers. These were powered by twelve coal-fired Marine-type water-tube boilers and two oil-fired double-ended boilers, which were vented through four funnels on the centerline. They were designed to give 26,000 shaft horsepower (19,000 kW), but reached 43,628 shp (32,533 kW) in service. The engines gave the ship a top speed of 29.3 knots (54.3 km/h; 33.7 mph). Rostock carried 1,300 t (1,280 long tons) of coal, and an additional 200 t (197 long tons) of fuel oil that gave her a range of approximately 5,000 nautical miles (9,300 km; 5,800 mi) at a cruising speed of 12 knots (22 km/h; 14 mph).

The ship was armed with a main battery of twelve 10.5 cm (4.1 in) SK L/45 guns in single pedestal mounts. Two were placed side by side forward on the forecastle; eight were located on the broadside, four on either side; and two were side by side aft. The guns had a maximum elevation of 30 degrees, which allowed them to engage targets out to 12,700 m (41,700 ft). They were supplied with 1,800 rounds of ammunition, for 150 shells per gun. She was also equipped with a pair of 50 cm (19.7 in) torpedo tubes with five torpedoes submerged in the hull on the broadside. She could also carry 120 mines.

The ship was protected by a waterline armored belt that was 60 mm (2.4 in) thick amidships. Additional protection was provided by a curved armor deck that sloped downward at the sides of the ship and connected to the bottom edge of the belt. The deck was 60 mm thick on the flat portion, decreasing to 40 mm (1.6 in) on the slopes. The conning tower had 100 mm (3.9 in) thick sides, and her main battery guns were fitted with 50 mm (2 in) thick gun shields.

== Service history ==
Rostock was ordered under the contract name "Ersatz Geier", (Note: German warships were ordered under provisional names. Additions to the fleet were given a single letter; ships intended to replace older or lost vessels were ordered as "Ersatz (name of the ship to be replaced)".) and was laid down at the Howaldtswerke shipyard in Kiel in 1911. She was launched on 12 November 1912; at her launching, she was christened by the mayor of her namesake city, Dr. Magnus Maßmann. After completing Fitting-out work, the ship was delivered to the navy on 14 January 1914, but her commissioning into active service was delayed until 5 February owing to a lack of manpower. Her crew was taken from the light cruiser Stettin. Rostock thereafter began sea trials, which were completed on 3 May. She was then assigned to the Scouting Unit for the High Seas Fleet. That month, she joined the rest of the fleet for a training cruise.

Rostock then escorted Kaiser Wilhelm II aboard his yacht, Hohenzollern, during his annual summer cruise to Norwegian waters in July. The cruise took place during the July Crisis in the aftermath of the assassination of Archduke Franz Ferdinand the previous month. As Europe slid toward war, the German fleet sailed back to Germany on 27 July; after arriving in Kiel later that day, Rostock was assigned to guard the outer roadstead against an expected torpedo-boat attack by Russian forces, though it did not materialize. The following day, Austria-Hungary declared war on Serbia over the assassination, and by 2 August, Germany had mobilized against Russia, in support of its Austro-Hungarian ally. The following day, hostilities between the Central Powers and the Triple Entente had begun. In the meantime, on 31 July, Rostock was moved to the main German base on the North Sea coast at Wilhelmshaven. In accordance with the fleet's mobilization plan, Rostock was assigned as the flagship of Kapitän zur See (Captain at Sea) Johannes Hartog, the II Commander of Torpedo-boats.

=== World War I ===
==== 1914 ====
Rostock's first wartime operation came on 9 August, when she led I Torpedo-boat Flotilla on a sweep into the southern North Sea to determine the position of the British patrol line. They failed to locate any British vessels, however, and returned to port the following day. Another uneventful patrol followed on 21–22 August, this time toward the Dogger Bank area. A British submarine launched two torpedoes at Rostock, though they both missed. Rostock thereafter went into dry dock for periodic maintenance, so she was unavailable during the Battle of Helgoland Bight on 28 August. The following day, Hartog became I Commander of Torpedo-boats, as his superior Konteradmiral (Rear Admiral) Leberecht Maass had been killed the previous day when his flagship, the cruiser Mainz, was sunk. Rostock next went to sea on 3 November as part of the screen for the High Seas Fleet during the raid on Yarmouth, which was carried out by the battlecruisers of I Scouting Group. The attack on the English coast took place early the next morning, but Rostock and the main fleet was stationed well to the rear to provide distant support.

Rostock was present for the next major operation, the raid on Scarborough, Hartlepool and Whitby on 15–16 December, again as part of the screen for the fleet. I Scouting Group reprised its bombardment role in the hope of drawing out a British response that could be defeated by the High Seas Fleet. On the evening of 15 December, the German battle fleet of some twelve dreadnoughts and eight pre-dreadnoughts came to within 10 nautical miles (19 km; 12 mi) of an isolated squadron of six British battleships. However, skirmishes between the rival torpedo boat and destroyer screens in the darkness convinced the German commander—Admiral Friedrich von Ingenohl—that he was faced with the entire Grand Fleet. Under orders from Kaiser Wilhelm II to avoid risking the fleet unnecessarily, Ingenohl broke off the engagement and turned the battlefleet back toward Germany.

==== 1915 ====
Rostock joined the light cruisers of II Scouting Group on 3 January 1915 to conduct a mine-sweeping operation to the west of Amrun Bank. On 24 January, Rostock formed part of the support for Admiral Franz von Hipper's battlecruisers in I Scouting Group during a sortie to destroy British light forces known to be operating near the Dogger Bank. The ship steamed with three other light cruisers and nineteen torpedo boats. Rostock and several of the torpedo boats were tasked with screening the port flank of the battlecruiser squadron. The German group encountered five British battlecruisers, resulting in the Battle of Dogger Bank, during which the armored cruiser Blücher was sunk. From 17 to 23 March, Rostock and II Scouting Group were moved to the Baltic for an operation against Russian forces attacking near Memel. The German ships bombarded Russian positions at Polangen on 23 March. They returned to the North Sea, and Rostock resumed her role leading the torpedo-boat flotillas during a fleet sweep on 29–30 March that failed to locate any British vessels.

The light cruisers Strassburg and Stralsund carried out a mine-laying operation off the Swarte Bank on 17–18 April, and Rostock was part of the covering force, which also included the cruiser Graudenz. Rostock joined a fleet patrol in the southern North Sea on 22 April to the Dogger Bank area. On 17–18 May, she participated in another minelaying operation, also off the Dogger Bank. Rostock, Graudenz, and Stralsund raided British fishing vessels off Horns Rev on 27–28 June. Rostock next went to sea on 11 September for another minelaying operation off the Swarte Bank, returning to port the following morning. She participated in another sweep toward Horns Rev on 23–24 October that ended uneventfully. On 16 December, Rostock, II Scouting Group, and several torpedo boats sortied for a patrol in search of British merchant shipping in the Skagerrak and Kattegat between Denmark and Norway. The ships returned to port in Kiel two days later and then continued on to Wilhelmshaven on 20 December.

==== 1916 ====
The following two months passed uneventfully, but on 5 March 1916, Rostock joined the fleet for a sweep to the Hoofden that lasted for two days. Another operation in the direction of Terschelling, this time in company with II Scouting Group, began on 25 March, but was cancelled the next day due to heavy seas. On 15 April, Kommodore Andreas Michelsen replaced Hartog as I Commander of Torpedo-boats. Six days later, Rostock conducted a patrol to Norden, returning the next day. On 24 April, she joined the fleet for the bombardment of Yarmouth and Lowestoft, which once again saw the battlecruisers shell coastal towns in the hopes of luring out a portion of the British fleet. Rostock accompanied the battlecruisers, and was among the first vessels to detect the approaching Harwich Force; the battlecruisers briefly engaged the British light forces, which quickly withdrew. The Germans then turned and departed as well. Rostock was not damaged in the brief encounter. The ship next went to sea for a patrol to Horns Rev on 5–6 May in company with II and III Torpedo-boat Flotillas. The Germans failed to locate any British surface ships, but they did encounter the submarine HMS E31, which launched a torpedo at Rostock that missed. The cruiser made a failed attempt to ram the submarine and then returned fire; the Germans observed a single hit on the submarine's conning tower before it submerged.

===== Battle of Jutland =====
Maps showing the maneuvers of the British (blue) and German (red) fleets on 30–31 May 1916

Rostock also participated in the Battle of Jutland, on 31 May 1916. She served as the leader of the torpedo boat flotillas, still flying Michelsen's flag. The flotilla was tasked with screening for the battle squadrons of the High Seas Fleet. As the German fleet reached the engagement between the British and German battlecruiser squadrons at 17:30, a pair of destroyers, HMS Nestor and Nicator attempted to attack the German battle line. Rostock and a number of the battleships engaged the destroyers, which were both disabled by the heavy German fire. Rostock and the battleships destroyed Nestor and Nicator and their crews were picked up by German torpedo boats; Rostock assisted in the rescue effort. For most of the daylight fighting, Rostock was not heavily engaged and was not hit.

At 19:32, Rostock and several torpedo boats crossed through the German line and began to lay a smoke screen to cover the withdrawal of the German fleet. Some twenty minutes later, Michelsen detached several torpedo boats to assist the badly damaged battlecruiser Lützow. By the time the German fleet had assumed its night cruising formation, Rostock fell in with the light cruisers of IV Scouting Group on the port side of the fleet. Shortly before midnight, Rostock and IV Scouting Group came into contact with the 2nd Light Cruiser Squadron. Shortly after midnight, the British 4th Destroyer Flotilla attacked the German line, where Rostock was positioned. She joined the cannonade directed against the destroyers as they pressed home their attack. The destroyers launched several torpedoes at the Germans, forcing Rostock and the other cruisers to turn away to avoid them; this pointed the ships directly at the battleships in I Battle Squadron. Rostock successfully passed through the formation, but the cruiser Elbing was rammed by one of the battleships and disabled.

In the chaos of the night engagement, Rostock's search lights illuminated the destroyer Broke. Gunfire from Rostock and the battleships Westfalen and Rheinland smothered the British destroyer; although heavily damaged, she managed to limp back to port. Rostock was attacked by the destroyers Ambuscade and Contest; the two ships each fired a single torpedo at high-speed settings at a range of about 1,000 yd (910 m). One torpedo struck Rostock at 1:30, though it is unknown which destroyer launched it. Rostock was also hit by three 4 in (102 mm) shells, probably from the destroyer Broke. Rostock's turbines were disabled by the hit, leaving her dead in the water, though her crew was able to restart the engines; she resumed steaming until saltwater got into the turbines, forcing the crew to shut them down to avoid destroying them. Once again immobilized, she called the destroyer S54 to join her; S54 took Rostock in tow, at times making up to 10 kn (19 km/h; 12 mph). The pair was subsequently joined by the destroyers V71 and V73, which had been detached from the flotilla to escort Rostock back to port.

At around 03:55 on 1 June, the four German ships encountered the British cruiser Dublin. At around the same time, the German zeppelin L 9 reported that twelve British capital ships were nearby, at Horns Rev, blocking the Germans' path. The three German destroyers went alongside the crippled cruiser and evacuated her crew, while flashing the first two letters of the British signal challenge. Smoke screens were laid to obscure the identity of the German warships. After about ten minutes, S54 departed with Rostock's crew aboard, while V71 and V73 remained. Scuttling charges had been set in the cruiser, but to ensure Rostock sank faster, the two destroyers fired a total of three torpedoes into the ship. Rostock sank bow-first at approximately 04:25, after which V71 and V73 made for Horns Reef at high speed. Of Rostock's crew, 14 men were killed and 6 were wounded during the battle. In the course of the battle, Rostock fired some 500 rounds of 10.5 cm ammunition, more than any other German ship. A second Rostock, of the Cöln class, was launched in April 1918, but was not completed before the end of the war.
