= Magdeburg-class cruiser =

Class of light cruisers of the German Imperial Navy

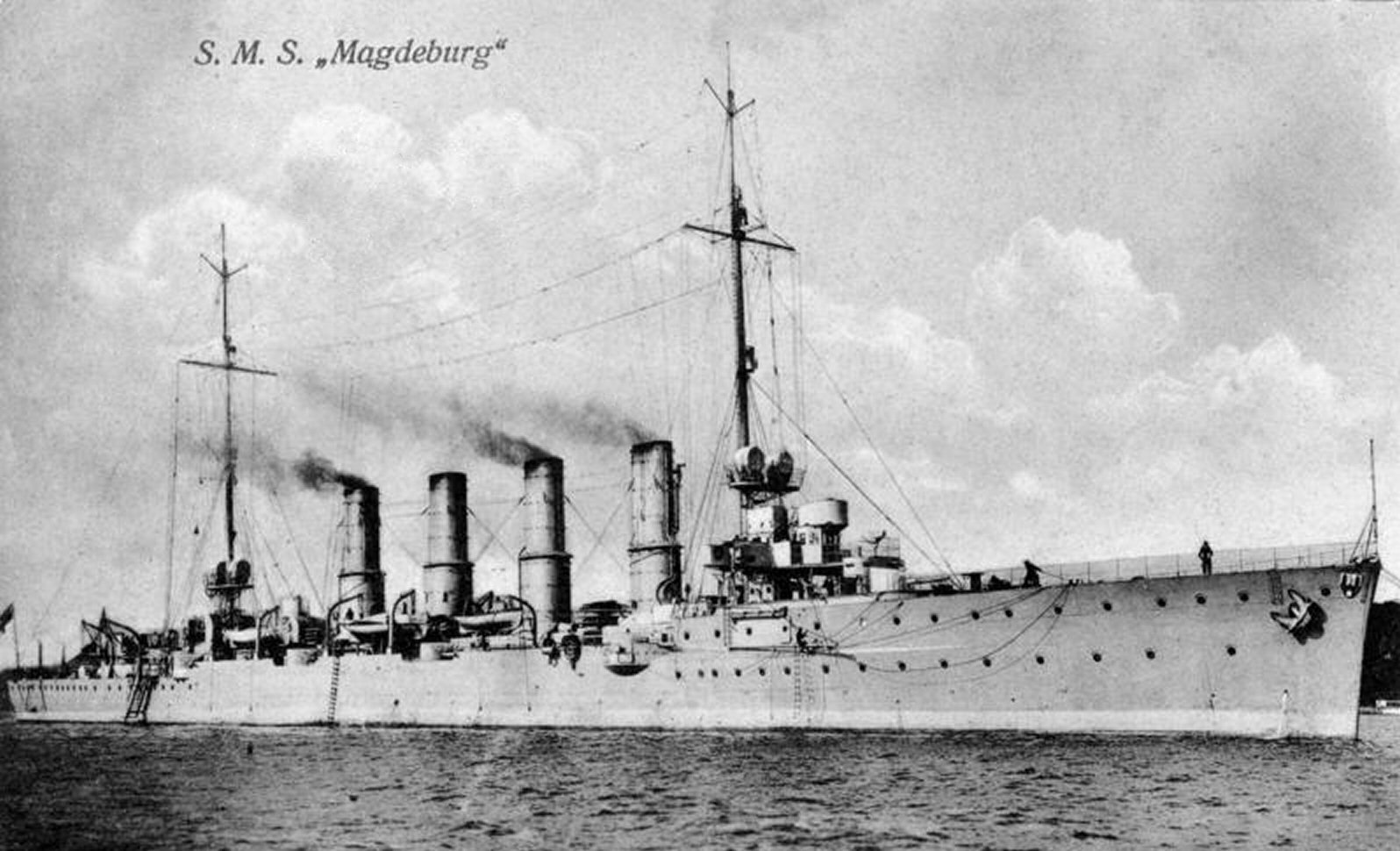
- Magdeburg in 1911

Class overview
- Builders: AG Weser (2); AG Vulcan (1); Kaiserliche Werft Wilhelmshaven (1)
- Operators: Imperial German Navy; Ottoman Navy; French Navy; Regia Marina
- Preceded by: Kolberg class
- Succeeded by: Karlsruhe class
- In commission: 1912–1942
- Completed: 4
- Lost: 3
- Retired: 1

General characteristics
- Type: Light cruiser
- Displacement: Normal: 4,570 t (4,500 long tons); Full load: 5,587 t (5,499 long tons)
- Length: 138.70 m (455 ft 1 in)
- Beam: 13.50 m (44 ft 3 in)
- Draft: 4.40 m (14 ft 5 in)
- Installed power: 16 × water-tube boilers; 25,000 shp (19,000 kW)
- Propulsion: 3 × steam turbines; 3 × screw propellers
- Speed: 27.5 knots (50.9 km/h; 31.6 mph)
- Range: 5,820 nmi (10,780 km; 6,700 mi) at 12 knots (22 km/h; 14 mph)
- Complement: 18 officers; 336 enlisted
- Armament: 1911: 12 × 10.5 cm (4.1 in) SK L/45 guns; 120 × mines; 2 × 50 cm (19.7 in) torpedo tubes; 1917: 7 × 15 cm (5.9 in) guns; 2 × 8.8 cm (3.5 in) SK L/45 guns; 2 × 50 cm (19.7 in) torpedo tubes
- Armor: Belt: 60 mm (2.4 in); Deck: 20–40 mm (0.79–1.57 in); Gun shields: 50 mm (2 in); Conning tower: 100 mm (3.9 in)

The Magdeburg class of light cruisers was a group of four ships built for the Imperial German Navy. The class comprised SMS Magdeburg, the lead ship, Breslau, Strassburg, and Stralsund. All four ships were laid down in 1910 and were completed by the end of 1912. They were armed with a main battery of twelve 10.5 cm guns, though over the course of their careers, Breslau, Strassburg, and Stralsund were rearmed with more powerful 15 cm guns. They displaced 4,570 t (4,500 long tons) at full load and were rated at a top speed of 27.5 knots (50.9 km/h; 31.6 mph), though all four vessels exceeded that figure on trials.

Magdeburg was used as a torpedo test ship before the outbreak of World War I in August 1914, after which she was assigned to the Baltic. She conducted a series of raids on Russian positions culminating in a sweep into the Gulf of Finland that resulted in her grounding off the Estonian coast. Russian cruisers seized the stranded ship and captured code books; they gave one copy to the British Royal Navy, which used it to great advantage. Breslau was assigned to the Mittelmeerdivision with the battlecruiser Goeben in 1912 and remained in the Mediterranean until the outbreak of war. After evading British warships, the two vessels reached Constantinople, where they were transferred to the Ottoman Navy. She operated primarily in the Black Sea against the Russian Navy, but in January 1918 she ventured into the Mediterranean and was mined and sunk after the Battle of Imbros.

Strassburg and Stralsund served with the High Seas Fleet in the North Sea against the British. They saw action at the Battle of Heligoland Bight in August 1914 and served in the reconnaissance screen for the battlecruisers of the I Scouting Group on several bombardments of the British coast in 1914–1915. Stralsund was also present at the Battle of Dogger Bank, but was not heavily engaged. Strassburg saw action during Operation Albion against the Russians in the Baltic. Both ships were surrendered to the Allies after the end of the war; Strassburg was ceded to Italy and renamed Taranto; she served with the Italian Navy until 1943, when she was scuttled after the Italian surrender. She was raised by the Germans and sunk by Allied bombers twice in 1943–1944, and finally scrapped in 1946–1947. Stralsund was given to France and renamed Mulhouse. She served only until 1925, when she was placed in reserve. She was ultimately broken up in 1935.

== Design ==
The design for the ships of the Magdeburg class was prepared in 1908–1909. The design incorporated a number of innovations, including a new longitudinal frame system in the hull, the development of which delayed construction by three to four years. The hull form was also redesigned to improve efficiency, and a new clipper bow was used instead of the old cruiser ram bow. They were the first German light cruisers to incorporate an armor belt at the waterline; this increased the strength of the hull and became standard practice in warship construction for decades. The quarterdeck was cut down to provide a location to drop mines. All of these features became standard for subsequent German cruiser designs.

=== General characteristics and machinery ===
The ships of the Magdeburg class were 136 meters (446 ft 2 in) long at the waterline and 138.70 m (455 ft 1 in) long overall. They had a beam of 13.50 m (44 ft 3 in) and a draft of 4.40 m (14 ft 5 in) forward and 5.16 m (16 ft 11 in) aft. They displaced 4,570 metric tons (4,500 long tons) normally and up to 5,587 t (5,499 long tons) at full load. The hulls were built with longitudinal steel frames and contained fourteen watertight compartments in Magdeburg, Strassburg, and Stralsund. Breslau's hull was divided into sixteen watertight compartments. All four vessels had a double bottom that extended for forty-five percent of the length of the hull.

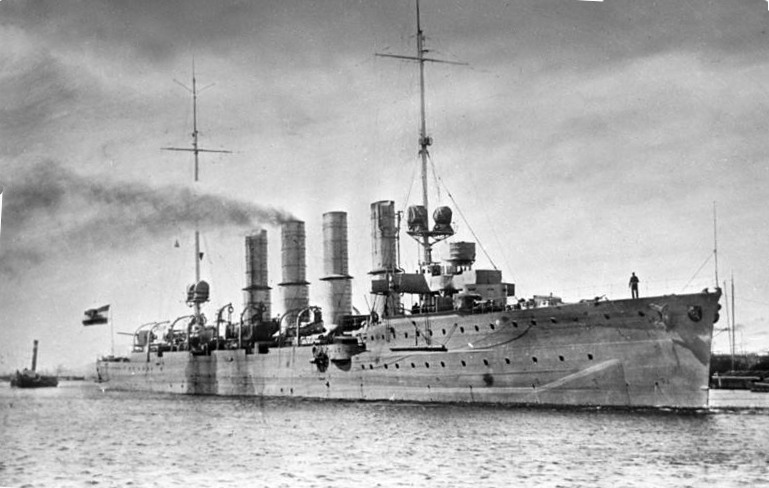
Breslau still in German service

The four vessels each had a crew of 18 officers and 336 enlisted men. They carried a number of smaller boats, including one picket boat, one barge, one cutter, two yawls, and two dinghies. The German Navy regarded the ships as good sea boats, with slight weather helm and gentle motion in a swell. The cruisers were maneuverable, but were slow going into a turn. Steering was controlled by a single large rudder. They lost speed only slightly in a head sea, but lost up to sixty percent in hard turns. They had a transverse metacentric height of .79 m (2 ft 7 in).

Their propulsion systems consisted of steam turbines of various types. Each ship had turbines built by different manufacturers to evaluate each design and configuration. Magdeburg had three engines produced by Bergmann, which drove three 2.75-meter (9 ft) screw propellers. Breslau was equipped with two pairs of AG Vulcan turbines, which powered four 3-bladed screws 2.47 m (8 ft 1 in) in diameter. Strassburg had a pair of Marine-type turbines with two 3.40 m (11 ft 2 in) wide propellers. Stralsund initially had three Bergmann turbines with three 2.75 m (9 ft) screws, though by the end of the war the center shaft was removed. All four propulsion systems were rated at 25,000 shaft horsepower (19,000 kW), but reached significantly higher speeds in service.

The ships' turbines were powered by sixteen coal-fired Marine-type water-tube boilers, although they were later altered to use fuel oil that was sprayed on the coal to increase its burn rate. These were divided into five boiler rooms on the centerline. These gave the ships a top speed of 27.0 knots (50.0 km/h; 31.1 mph), though on speed trials all four ships exceeded this by at least half a knot. The ships carried 1,200 t (1,200 long tons) of coal, and an additional 106 t (104 long tons) of oil that gave them a range of approximately 5,820 nautical miles (10,780 km; 6,700 mi) at 12 knots (22 km/h; 14 mph). At 25 knots (46 km/h; 29 mph), the range fell considerably to 900 nmi (1,700 km; 1,000 mi). Magdeburg, Strassburg, and Stralsund each had four turbo generators with a combined output of 320 kilowatts (430 hp) at 220 Volts; Breslau only had two generators.

=== Armament and armor ===
Plan and profile of the Magdeburg class

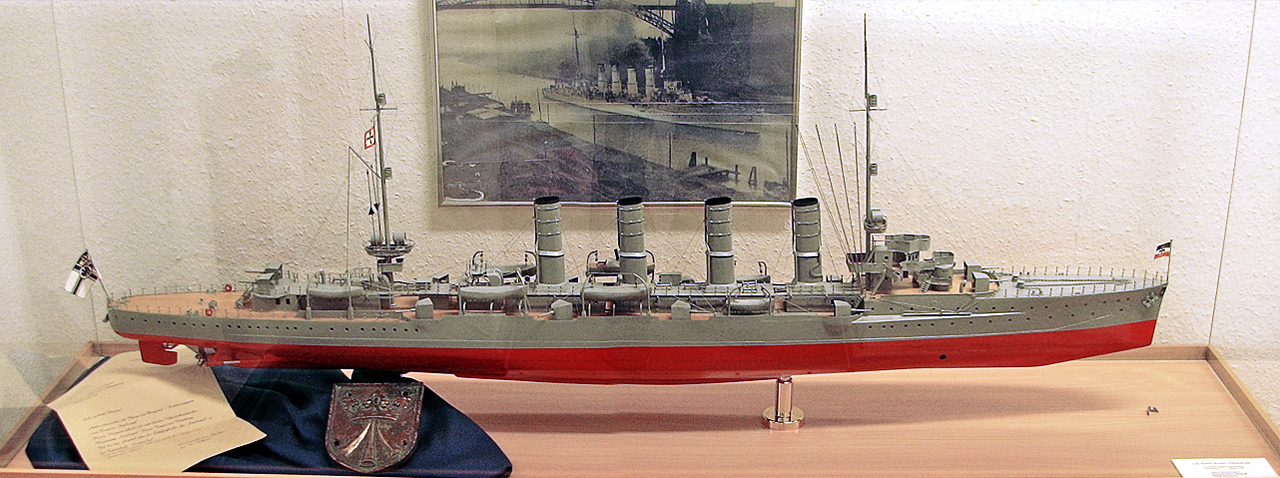
Model of a Magdeburg-class cruiser in the Marinemuseum in Dänholm

The four Magdeburg-class ships were armed with a main battery of twelve 10.5 cm (4.1 in) SK L/45 guns in single pedestal mounts. Two were placed side by side forward on the forecastle, eight were located amidships, four on either side, and two were side by side aft. The guns had a maximum elevation of 30 degrees, which allowed them to engage targets out to 12,700 m (13,900 yd). They were supplied with 1,800 rounds of ammunition, for 150 shells per gun. They were also equipped with a pair of 50 cm (19.7 in) torpedo tubes with five torpedoes submerged in the hull on the broadside. The ships could also carry 120 mines.

Over the course of their careers, the ships all had their armament upgraded, with the exception of Magdeburg. In 1916, two of Breslau's 10.5 cm guns were replaced with 15 cm (5.9 in) SK L/45 guns, which had a range of 17,600 m (19,200 yd). The following year, the remaining ten 10.5 cm guns were replaced with six 15 cm guns. In 1915, Strassburg was rearmed with seven 15 cm guns, two 8.8 cm (3.5 in) SK L/45 guns, and two deck-mounted 50 cm torpedo tubes. Stralsund was modified similarly, though her submerged torpedo tubes were removed during the refit.

The ships were protected by a waterline armor belt that was 60 mm (2.4 in) thick amidships and 18 mm (0.71 in) thick on the bow. The stern was unarmored. The deck was covered with up to 60 mm thick armor plate forward, 40 mm (1.6 in) thick amidships, and 20 mm (0.79 in) thick aft. Sloped armor 40 mm thick connected the deck and belt armor. The conning tower had 100 mm (3.9 in) thick sides and a 20 mm thick roof. A rangefinder was added with 30 mm (1.2 in) thick steel plating. The main battery guns had 50 mm (2 in) thick gun shields.

== Construction ==
Magdeburg was ordered under the contract name "Ersatz Bussard" and was laid down at the AG Weser shipyard in Bremen in 1910 and launched on 13 May 1911, after which fitting-out work commenced. She was commissioned into the High Seas Fleet on 20 August 1912. Breslau was ordered under the contract name "Ersatz Falke" and was laid down at the AG Vulcan shipyard in Stettin in 1910. At her launching ceremony on 16 May 1911, she was christened by the mayor of Breslau, the ship's namesake. After her launching, fitting-out work commenced and lasted until mid-1912. She was commissioned into the High Seas Fleet on 10 May 1912.

Strassburg was ordered under the contract name "Ersatz Condor" and was laid down at the Kaiserliche Werft shipyard in Wilhelmshaven in 1910 and launched on 24 August 1911, after which fitting-out work commenced. She was commissioned into the High Seas Fleet on 9 October 1912. Stralsund was ordered under the contract name "Ersatz Cormoran" and was laid down at the AG Weser shipyard in 1910 and launched on 4 November 1911, after which fitting-out work commenced. She was commissioned into the High Seas Fleet on 10 December 1912.

== Service history ==
=== Magdeburg ===
Magdeburg was used as a torpedo test ship after her commissioning until the outbreak of World War I in August 1914, when she was brought to active service and deployed to the Baltic. In the Baltic, Magdeburg fired the first shots of the war against the Russians on 2 August, when she shelled the port of Libau. She participated in a series of bombardments of Russian positions until late August. On the 26th, she participated in a sweep of the entrance to the Gulf of Finland; while steaming off the Estonian coast, she ran aground off the island of Odensholm and could not be freed. A pair of Russian cruisers appeared and seized the ship. Fifteen crew members were killed in the brief engagement. They recovered three intact German code books, one of which they passed to the British. The ability to decrypt German wireless signals provided the British with the ability to ambush German units on several occasions during the war, including the Battle of Jutland. The Russians partially scrapped Magdeburg while she remained grounded before completely destroying the wreck.

=== Breslau ===
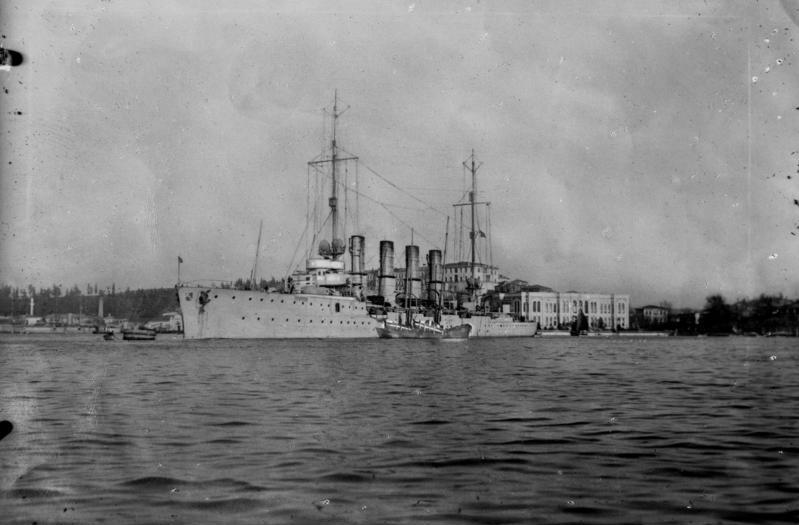
Breslau, flying the Turkish flag as Midilli

Following her commissioning, Breslau and the battlecruiser Goeben were assigned to the Mittelmeerdivision in response to the Balkan Wars. After evading British warships in the Mediterranean to reach Constantinople, Breslau and Goeben were transferred to the Ottoman Empire in August 1914, to entice the Ottomans to join the Central Powers in World War I. The ships were renamed Midilli and Yavuz Sultan Selim, respectively, and saw extensive service with the Ottoman fleet, primarily in the Black Sea against the Russian Black Sea Fleet. The two ships, along with several other Ottoman vessels, raided Russian ports in October 1914, prompting a Russian declaration of war.

Midilli was active in laying minefields off the Russian coast, bombarding Russian ports and installations and, because of a shortage of Ottoman merchant ships, transporting troops and supplies to the Black Sea ports supplying Ottoman troops fighting in the Caucasus Campaign. She was lightly damaged several times by Russian ships, but the most serious damage was inflicted by a mine in 1915, which kept her out of service for half of a year. The ship was mined and sunk in January 1918 during the Battle of Imbros in which Yavuz Sultan Selim was also mined and badly damaged. The majority of her crew were killed in the sinking.

=== Strassburg ===
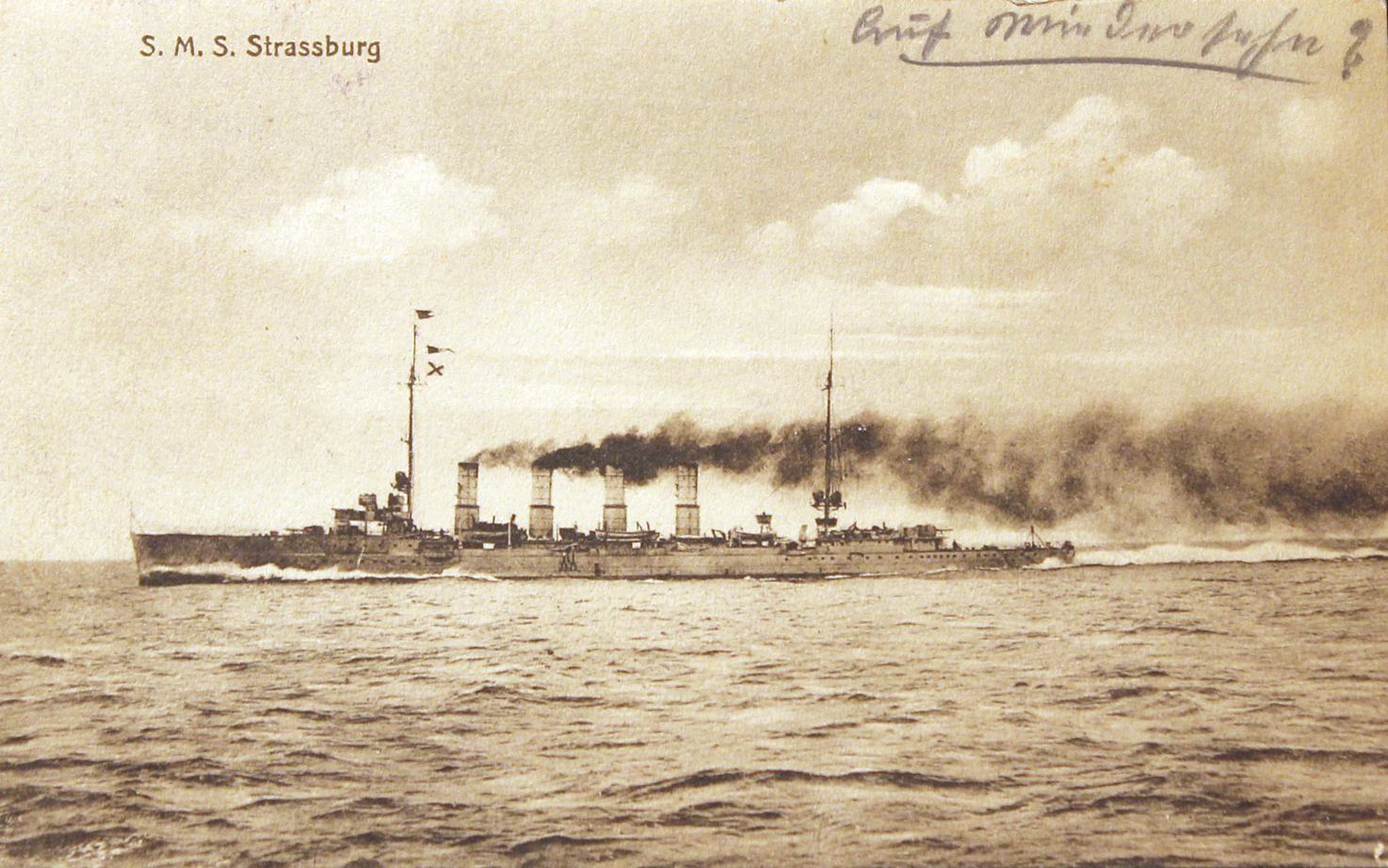
Strassburg steaming at high speed

Strassburg spent the first year of her service overseas, after which she was assigned to the reconnaissance forces of the High Seas Fleet. She saw significant action at the Battle of Heligoland Bight in August 1914 and participated in the raid on Scarborough, Hartlepool and Whitby in December 1914. By 1916, the ship was transferred to the Baltic to operate against the Russian Navy. She saw action during Operation Albion in the Gulf of Riga in October 1917, including screening for the battleships König and Markgraf during the Battle of Moon Sound. She returned to the North Sea for the planned final operation against the British Grand Fleet in the last weeks of the war, and was involved in the mutinies that forced the cancellation of the operation.

The ship served briefly in the new Reichsmarine in 1919 before being transferred to Italy as a war prize. She was formally transferred in July 1920 and renamed Taranto for service in the Italian Navy. In 1936–1937, she was rebuilt for colonial duties and additional anti-aircraft guns were installed. She saw no significant action during World War II until the Armistice that ended Italy's participation in the war. She was scuttled by the Italian Navy, captured and raised by the Germans, and sunk by Allied bombers in October 1943. The Germans raised the ship again, which was sunk a second time by bombers in September 1944. Taranto was finally broken up for scrap in 1946–1947.

=== Stralsund ===
Stralsund was assigned to the reconnaissance forces of the High Seas Fleet for the majority of her career. She saw significant action in the early years of World War I, including several operations off the British coast and the Battles of Heligoland Bight and Dogger Bank, in August 1914 and January 1915, respectively. She was not damaged in either action. The ship was in dockyard hands during the Battle of Jutland, and so she missed the engagement. After the end of the war, she served briefly in the Reichsmarine before being surrendered to the Allies. She was ceded to the French Navy, where she served as Mulhouse until 1925. She was formally stricken in 1933 and broken up for scrap two years later.
