= Karlsruhe-class cruiser =

Class of light cruisers of the German Imperial Navy

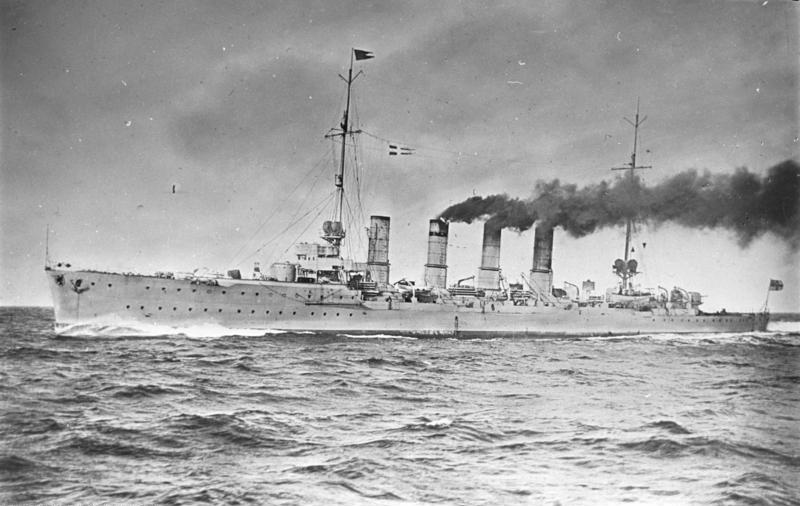
- SMS Karlsruhe

Class overview
- Builders: Germaniawerft; Howaldtswerke
- Operators: Imperial German Navy
- Preceded by: Magdeburg class
- Succeeded by: Graudenz class
- Built: 1911–1914
- In service: 1914–1916
- Planned: 2
- Completed: 2
- Lost: 2

General characteristics
- Type: Light cruiser
- Displacement: Normal: 4,900 t (4,800 long tons); Full load: 6,191 t (6,093 long tons)
- Length: 142.20 m (466 ft 6 in)
- Beam: 13.70 m (44 ft 11 in)
- Draft: 5.38 m (17 ft 8 in)
- Installed power: 14 × water-tube boilers; 26,000 shp (19,000 kW)
- Propulsion: 2 × steam turbines; 2 × screw propellers
- Speed: 29.3 kn (54.3 km/h; 33.7 mph)
- Complement: 18 officers; 355 enlisted men
- Armament: 12 × 10.5 cm (4.1 in) SK L/45 guns; 2 × 50 cm (19.7 in) torpedo tubes; 120 × mines
- Armor: Belt: 60 mm (2.4 in); Deck: 60 mm; Conning tower: 100 mm (3.9 in)

The Karlsruhe class of light cruisers was a pair of two ships built for the German Imperial Navy before the start of World War I. The ships—SMS Karlsruhe and Rostock—were very similar to the previous Magdeburg-class cruisers, mounting the same armament and similar armor protection, though they were larger and faster than the earlier ships. Both vessels were laid down in 1911, and launched one day apart, on 11 and 12 November 1912. Karlsruhe joined the fleet in January 1914, but fitting out work lasted slightly longer on her sister; Rostock was commissioned the following month.

Both of the ships had short service careers. Karlsruhe was assigned to overseas duty in the Caribbean, arriving on station in July 1914, days before the outbreak of World War I. Once the war began, she armed the passenger liner SS Kronprinz Wilhelm so it could raid British shipping. After a moderately successful commerce raiding career, during which Karlsruhe sank sixteen merchant ships and successfully evaded British cruisers, she sank after an accidental internal explosion on 4 November 1914. Most of her crew were killed in the sinking, but the survivors returned to Germany on one of Karlsruhe's attendant colliers by December.

Rostock served as a torpedo boat flotilla leader with the High Seas Fleet following her commissioning; her flotilla frequently screened for the battlecruisers in the I Scouting Group, including during the Battle of Dogger Bank in January 1915 and operations off the British coast in early 1916. She saw heavy action during the Battle of Jutland on 31 May – 1 June 1916 as part of the screen for the main battle fleet. In the ferocious night fighting that occurred as the German fleet punched through the British rear-guard, Rostock was torpedoed by a British destroyer, which immobilized the ship. She was taken under tow by several torpedo boats, but early on the morning of 1 June, the cruiser HMS Dublin located the cruiser. To prevent her capture by the British, the Germans scuttled the ship after taking off her crew.

== Design ==
The design for the Karlsruhe class was prepared in 1910, and was an incremental improvement over the previous Magdeburg class. Karlsruhe and Rostock were faster and had a larger, more raked hull and greater displacement, but had the same armament and armor protection. Karlsruhe was ordered as Ersatz Seeadler and laid down in 1911 at the Germaniawerft shipyard in Kiel, under construction number 181. She was launched on 11 November 1912 and commissioned into the fleet on 15 January 1914. Rostock was ordered as Ersatz Geier and laid down in 1911 at the Howaldtswerke dockyard in Kiel, under construction number 560. Launching ceremonies took place on 12 November 1912, a day after her sister. She was completed on 5 February 1914, the date she joined the fleet.

=== Dimensions and machinery ===
The Karlsruhe class ships were 139 meters (456 ft) long at the waterline and 142.20 m (466 ft 6 in) long overall. They had a beam of 13.70 m (44 ft 11 in) and a draft of 5.38 m (17 ft 8 in) forward and 6.20 m (20 ft 4 in) aft. They displaced 4,900 metric tons (4,800 long tons) at designed load and 6,191 t (6,093 long tons) at full loading. The hull was constructed with longitudinal steel frames and incorporated fifteen watertight compartments and a double bottom that extended for 45 percent of the length of the hull. The ships had a crew of eighteen officers and 355 enlisted men. Karlsruhe and Rostock carried a number of smaller vessels, including one picket boat, one barge, one cutter, two yawls, and two dinghies. After 1915, Rostock had spotting tops installed on her masts. The German Navy regarded the two ships as good sea boats. They suffered from slight weather helm in a swell and made severe leeway. They were maneuverable but were slow steering into a turn. With the rudder hard over, they lost up to 60 percent speed. Their transverse metacentric height was 0.79 m (2 ft 7 in).

Karlsruhe and Rostock were powered by two sets of Marine-type steam turbines, each of which drove a three-bladed screw 3.50 m (11 ft 6 in) in diameter. Each turbine was divided into its own engine room; steam was supplied by twelve coal-fired water tube boilers and two oil-fired double-ended water tube boilers split into five boiler rooms. The propulsion system was rated at 26,000 shaft horsepower (19,000 kW) and a top speed of 27.8 knots (51.5 km/h; 32.0 mph), but both ships significantly exceeded these figures on speed trials. Karlsruhe made 37,885 shp (28,251 kW) at 28.5 knots (52.8 km/h; 32.8 mph) and Rostock reached 43,628 shp (32,533 kW) and 29.3 knots (54.3 km/h; 33.7 mph). Designed coal and oil storage was 400 t (394 long tons; 441 short tons) and 70 t (69 long tons; 77 short tons), respectively, though internal voids could accommodate up to 1,300 t (1,279 long tons; 1,433 short tons) and 200 t (197 long tons; 220 short tons), respectively. Electrical power was supplied by two turbo generators rated at 240 and 200 kilowatts, respectively, at 220 volts.

=== Armament and armor ===
Karlsruhe and Rostock were armed identically to the previous Magdeburg-class cruisers. They carried a main battery of twelve 10.5 cm (4.1 in) SK L/45 guns in single pedestal mounts. Two were placed side by side forward on the forecastle, eight were located amidships, four on either side, and two were side by side aft. The guns had a maximum elevation of 30 degrees, which allowed them to engage targets out to 12,700 m (41,666 ft 8 in). They were supplied with 1,800 rounds of ammunition, for 150 shells per gun. The ships were also equipped with a pair of 50 cm (19.7 in) torpedo tubes with five torpedoes submerged in the hull on the broadside. They could also carry 120 mines.

The ships' armor was also identical to the preceding class. They were protected by a waterline armored belt that was 60 mm (2.4 in) thick amidships; the belt was reduced to 18 mm (0.71 in) forward. The stern was not armored. The conning tower had 100 mm (3.9 in) thick sides and a 20 mm (0.79 in) thick roof. The deck was covered with 60 mm thick armor plate forward, 40 mm (1.6 in) amidships, and 20 mm aft. Sloped armor 40 mm thick connected the deck to the belt armor.

== Service history ==
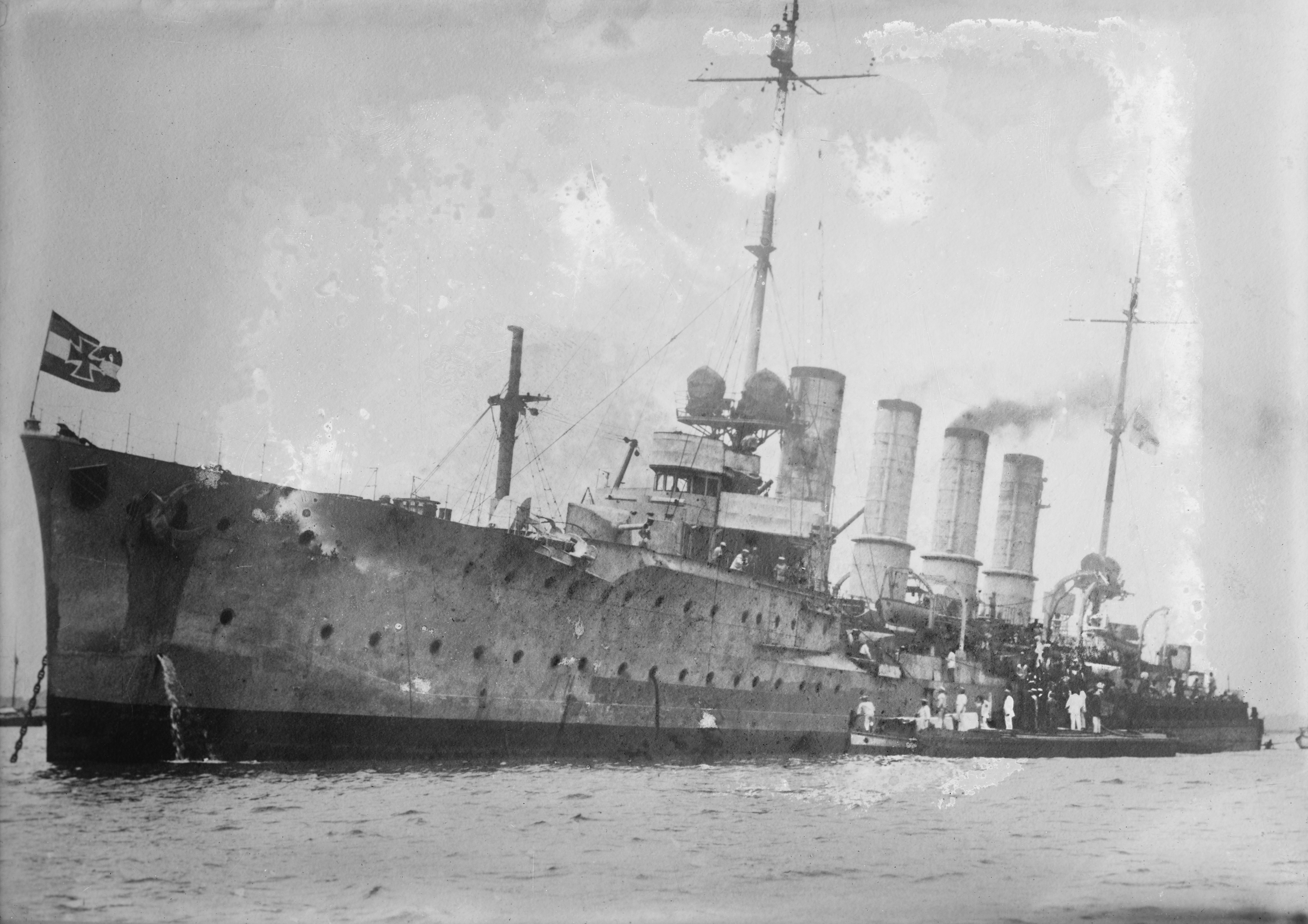
Karlsruhe coaling in San Juan

=== SMS Karlsruhe ===
After her commissioning, Karlsruhe was assigned to overseas duties in the Caribbean, where she was to relieve the cruiser Dresden. She arrived in the area in July 1914, days before the outbreak of World War I. Once the war began, she armed the passenger liner SS Kronprinz Wilhelm so it could operate as a commerce raider, but while the ships were transferring equipment, British cruisers located them and pursued Karlsruhe. Her superior speed allowed her to escape, after which she operated off the northeastern coast of Brazil.

Karlsruhe refueled at Puerto Rico, a possession of the then neutral United States before steaming to Brazil. Off the Brazilian coast, she captured or sank sixteen ships totaling 72,805 gross register tons (GRT) while eluding her pursuers. The ship's captain then decided to operate against the shipping lanes to Barbados. While en route on 4 November 1914, a spontaneous internal explosion destroyed the ship and killed the majority of the crew, including her captain. The survivors used one of Karlruhe's colliers to return to Germany in December 1914.

=== SMS Rostock ===
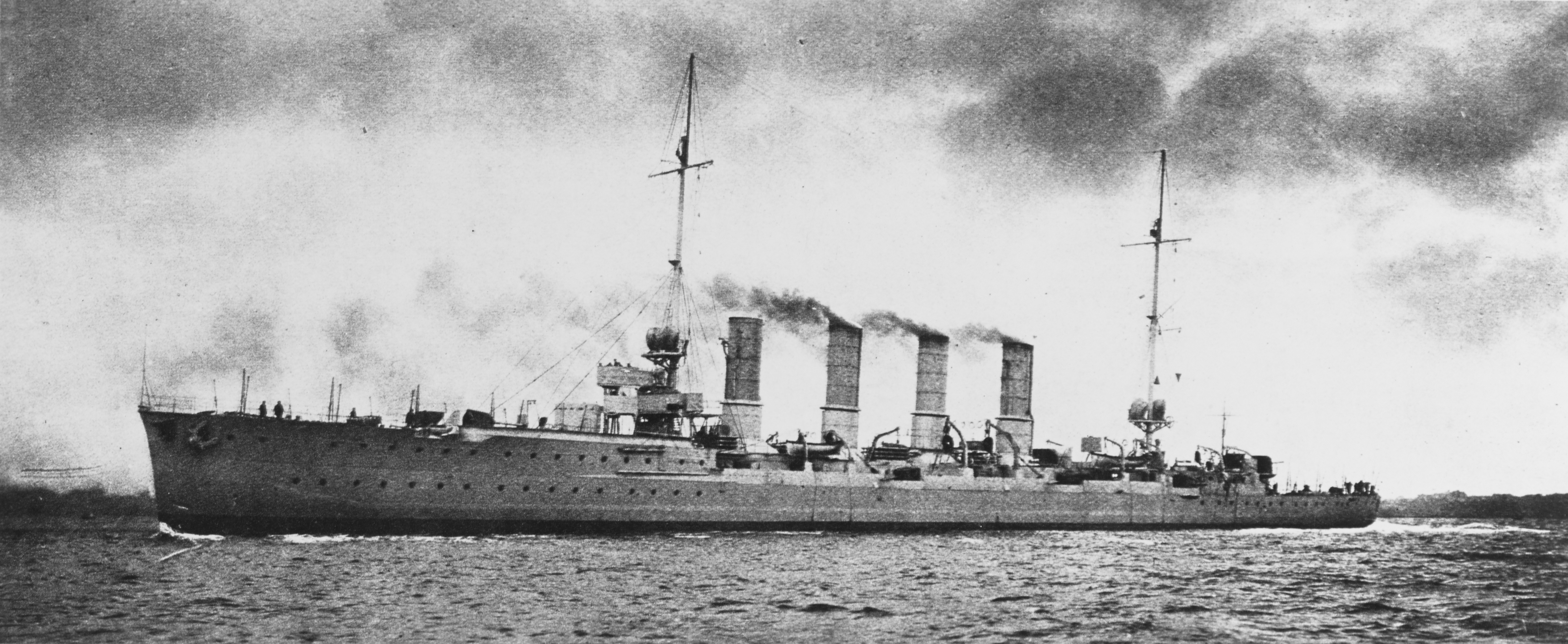
Rostock

Rostock served with the High Seas Fleet as a leader of torpedo boat flotillas for the duration of her career. She served with the screens for both Rear Admiral Franz von Hipper's battlecruisers of the I Scouting Group on operations against the British coast and the Battle of Dogger Bank. During the battle, British battlecruisers ambushed the German squadron and sank the armored cruiser Blücher. In April 1916, she again screened the battlecruisers during the bombardment of Yarmouth and Lowestoft, during which Rostock and five other cruisers briefly engaged the British Harwich Force.

She was assigned to the screen for the battle fleet during the Battle of Jutland on 31 May – 1 June 1916. She saw major action at Jutland and frequently engaged British light forces, including assisting in the destruction of the destroyers HMS Nomad and Nestor. Rostock's participation in the battle culminated in her torpedoing by destroyers shortly after midnight. She was taken under tow by German torpedo boats, but the following morning the cruiser HMS Dublin came upon the retreating ships. To prevent Rostock's capture, the Germans set scuttling charges aboard her and took off the crew before firing torpedoes into the disabled cruiser to ensure she sank.
