= I Scouting Group =

German naval unit during World War I

I Scouting Group I. Aufklärungsgruppe
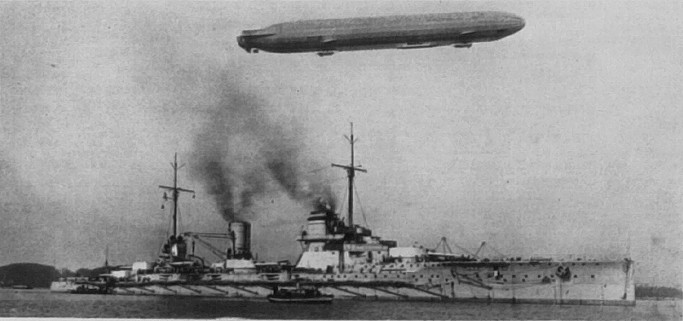
- Seydlitz with a Zeppelin overhead
- Country: Germany
- Branch: Kaiserliche Marine
- Type: Reconnaissance unit
- Engagements: Battle of Dogger Bank; Battle of Jutland

Commanders
- Notable commanders: Hugo von Pohl; Franz von Hipper

The I Scouting Group (German: I. Aufklärungsgruppe) was a special reconnaissance unit within the German Kaiserliche Marine. The unit was famously commanded by Admiral Franz von Hipper during World War I. The I Scouting Group was one of the most active formations in the High Seas Fleet during the war; the unit took part in every major fleet operation in the North Sea, including the battles of Dogger Bank and Jutland. The unit also saw limited action in the Baltic Sea, including the Battle of the Gulf of Riga.

== Ships assigned to the I Scouting Group ==
Von der Tann was the first battlecruiser assigned to the I Scouting group. The ship joined the unit on 8 May 1911. On 30 September, Moltke was commissioned into the I Scouting Group, and replaced the old armored cruiser Roon. Seydlitz joined the unit after she was commissioned on 22 May 1913. Blücher was attached to the unit from August 1914. Derfflinger was slated to be assigned to the unit by the end of October 1914, but turbine damage delayed the ship from joining the I Scouting Group until 16 November of that year. Derfflinger's sistership Lützow joined the unit on 20 March 1916. The third Derfflinger-class battlecruiser, and final ship to join the I Scouting Group, Hindenburg, was assigned to the unit on 6 November 1917. Of the seven true battlecruisers built by the Kaiserliche Marine, only Goeben was not attached to the I Scouting Group, as she was made the flagship of the Mittelmeerdivision in October 1912.

In preparation of the fleet advance on 18–19 August 1916, the I Scouting Group was to bombard the coastal town of Sunderland, but only two remaining German battlecruisers were still in fighting condition (Moltke and Von der Tann ) so three dreadnoughts were assigned to the Group for the operation: Markgraf, Grosser Kurfürst, and the newly commissioned Bayern.

== Service history ==
The I Scouting Group was one of the most active units in the High Seas Fleet during World War I. The ships were known to be used repeatedly in attempts to lure out sections of the British Grand Fleet, where they could be defeated by the entire German battle fleet. Several of these operations called for the ships of the I Scouting Group to bombard the English coast; these included the raid on Yarmouth, the raid on Scarborough, Hartlepool and Whitby, and the bombardment of Yarmouth and Lowestoft. The unit also participated in raids against British naval forces, including the operations that resulted in the Battle of Dogger Bank and the Battle of Jutland.

== See also ==
- Imperial German Navy order of battle (1914)
