= SMS Loreley =

Two vessels of the German Kaiserliche Marine (Imperial Navy) have been named Loreley:

- SMS Loreley (1859), a paddle steamer aviso
- SMS Loreley (1885), a gunboat
