= SMS Ostfriesland =

Battleship of the German Imperial Navy

Coordinates: 37°09′08″N 74°34′03″W

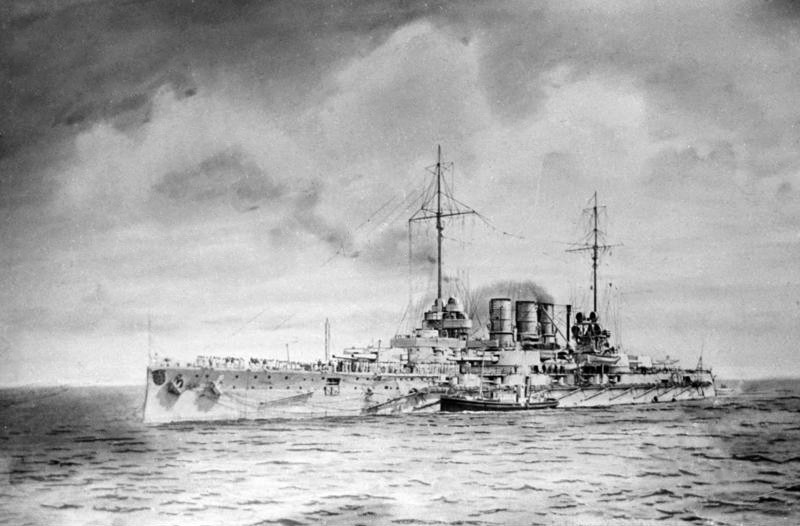
- SMS Ostfriesland

History

German Empire
- Name: SMS Ostfriesland
- Namesake: East Frisia
- Builder: Kaiserliche Werft, Wilhelmshaven
- Laid down: 19 October 1908
- Launched: 30 September 1909
- Commissioned: 1 August 1911
- Decommissioned: 16 December 1918
- Stricken: 5 November 1919
- Fate: Ceded to United States, 1920

History

United States
- Name: USS Ostfriesland
- Acquired: 7 April 1920
- Commissioned: 7 April 1920
- Decommissioned: 20 September 1920
- Fate: Sunk as a target by aircraft, 21 July 1921

General characteristics
- Class & type: Helgoland-class battleship
- Displacement: Normal: 22,808 t (22,448 long tons); Full load: 24,700 t (24,300 long tons)
- Length: 167.20 m (548 ft 7 in)
- Beam: 28.50 m (93 ft 6 in)
- Draft: 8.94 m (29 ft 4 in)
- Installed power: 15 × water-tube boilers; 28,000 PS (28,000 ihp)
- Propulsion: 3 × triple-expansion steam engines; 3 × screw propellers
- Speed: 21.2 knots (39.3 km/h; 24.4 mph)
- Range: 5,500 nautical miles (10,190 km; 6,330 mi) at 10 knots (19 km/h; 12 mph)
- Complement: 42 officers; 1071 enlisted
- Armament: 12 × 30.5 cm (12 in) SK L/50 guns; 14 × 15 cm (5.9 in) SK L/45 guns; 14 × 8.8 cm (3.5 in) SK L/45 guns; 6 × 50 cm (19.7 in) torpedo tubes
- Armor: Belt: 300 mm (11.8 in) KCA; Turrets: 300 mm KCA; Barbettes: 300 mm KCA; Deck: 63.5 mm (2.50 in) KCA

SMS Ostfriesland (Note: "SMS" stands for "Seiner Majestät Schiff" (German: His Majesty's Ship).) was the second vessel of the Helgoland class of dreadnought battleships of the Imperial German Navy. Named for the region of East Frisia, Ostfriesland's keel was laid in October 1908 at the Kaiserliche Werft dockyard in Wilhelmshaven. She was launched on 30 September 1909 and was commissioned into the fleet on 1 August 1911. The ship was equipped with twelve 30.5 cm (12 in) guns in six twin turrets, and had a top speed of 21.2 knots (39.3 km/h; 24.4 mph). Ostfriesland was assigned to the I Battle Squadron of the High Seas Fleet for the majority of her career, including World War I.

Along with her three sister ships, Helgoland, Thüringen, and Oldenburg, Ostfriesland participated in all of the major fleet operations of World War I in the North Sea against the British Grand Fleet. This included the Battle of Jutland on 31 May – 1 June 1916, the largest naval battle of the war. The ship also saw action in the Baltic Sea against the Russian Navy. She was present during the unsuccessful first incursion into the Gulf of Riga in August 1915.

After the German collapse in November 1918, most of the High Seas Fleet was interned in Scapa Flow during the peace negotiations. The four Helgoland-class ships were allowed to remain in Germany, however, and were therefore spared the destruction of the fleet in Scapa Flow. Ostfriesland and her sisters were eventually ceded to the victorious Allied powers as war reparations; Ostfriesland was transferred to the United States Navy. She was sunk during air power trials off the Virginia Capes in July 1921.

== Design ==
Many senior officers in the German Kaiserliche Marine (Imperial Navy) acknowledged that the Nassau-class battleships, armed with 28 cm (11 in) guns, were inferior to their British counterparts that carried 30.5 cm (12 in) guns. They sought to incorporate guns of the latter caliber in the next battleship design, though the significant increase in cost from the pre-dreadnought Deutschland-class battleships to the dreadnought Nassau class precluded another major qualitative increase until the 1908 budget year, two years after the first Nassaus were ordered. The design staff experimented with a variety of gun turret arrangements, including superfiring layouts like the American South Carolina class, but they ultimately settled on the same hexagonal arrangement of the Nassaus.

=== Characteristics ===
Plan and profile drawing of the Helgoland class

The ship was 167.2 m (548 ft 7 in) long, had a beam of 28.5 m (93 ft 6 in) and a draft of 8.94 m (29 ft 4 in), and displaced 24,700 metric tons (24,310 long tons) at full load. Ostfriesland had a flush deck and minimal superstructure that consisted primarily of a large, armored conning tower forward and a smaller, secondary conning position further aft. Ostfriesland was fitted with additional facilities for an admiral's staff so she could be used as a flagship. The ship was fitted with a pair of pole masts, which held spotting tops and positions for searchlights. She had a crew of 42 officers and 1,071 enlisted men.

She was powered by three 4-cylinder triple-expansion steam engines; each engine drove a four-bladed screw. Steam was provided by fifteen water-tube boilers, which were vented through three closely spaced funnels placed amidships. The ship's engines were rated at 28,000 PS (28,000 ihp; 21,000 kW) and produced a top speed of 21.2 knots (39.3 km/h; 24.4 mph). Ostfriesland stored up to 3,200 metric tons (3,100 long tons) of coal, which allowed her to steam for 5,500 nautical miles (10,200 km; 6,300 mi) at a speed of 10 knots (19 km/h; 12 mph). After 1915 the boilers were modified to spray oil on the coal; the ship could carry up to 197 metric tons (194 long tons) of fuel oil.

Ostfriesland was armed with a main battery of twelve 30.5 cm (12 in) SK L/50 (Note: In Imperial German Navy gun nomenclature, "SK" (Schnelladekanone) denotes that the gun is quick firing, while the L/50 denotes the length of the gun. In this case, the L/50 gun is 50 calibers, meaning that the gun is 50 times as long as its diameter.) guns in six twin gun turrets, with one turret fore, one aft, and two on each flank of the ship. The ship's secondary battery consisted of fourteen 15 cm (5.9 in) SK L/45 guns, all of which were mounted in casemates in the side of the upper deck. For defense against torpedo boats, she carried fourteen 8.8 cm (3.5 in) SK L/45 guns. After 1914, two of the 8.8 cm guns were removed and replaced by 8.8 cm anti-aircraft guns. Ostfriesland was also armed with six 50 cm (19.7 in) submerged torpedo tubes; one was in the bow, one in the stern, and two on each broadside.

Her main armored belt was 300 mm (11.8 in) thick in the central citadel, and was composed of Krupp cemented armor (KCA). Her main battery gun turrets were protected by the same thickness of KCA on the sides and faces, as well as the barbettes that supported the turrets. Ostfriesland's deck was 63.5 mm (2.5 in) thick.

== Service history ==
Ostfriesland at sea before World War I

Ostfriesland was ordered by the German Imperial Navy (Kaiserliche Marine) under the provisional name Ersatz Oldenburg, as a replacement for the old coastal defense ship Oldenburg. The contract for the ship was awarded to the Kaiserliche Werft (Imperial Dockyard) in Wilhelmshaven under construction number 31. (Note: German warships were ordered under provisional names. Additions to the fleet were given a single letter; ships intended to replace older or lost vessels were ordered as "Ersatz (name of the ship to be replaced)".) Work began on 19 October 1908 with the laying of her keel, and the ship was launched less than a year later, on 30 September 1909. She was christened by the Princess of Innhausen and Knyphausen, a representative of the oldest East Frisian nobility. Fitting out, including completion of the superstructure and the installation of armament, lasted until August 1911. Ostfriesland, named for the north-western coastal area of Germany, was commissioned into the High Seas Fleet on 1 August 1911, just under three years from when work commenced.

After commissioning, Ostfriesland conducted sea trials, which were completed by 15 September. Kapitän zur See (KzS—Captain at Sea) Walter Engelhardt served as the ship's first commanding officer. On the 22nd, the ship was formally assigned to I Battle Squadron of the High Seas Fleet. She then conducted individual ship training exercises, which were followed by I Squadron, and then fleet maneuvers in November. Ostfriesland became the new squadron flagship on 24 April 1912, replacing Westfalen, and flying the flag of Vizeadmiral (VAdm—Vice Admiral) Hugo von Pohl. The annual summer cruise in July–August, which typically went to Norway, was interrupted by the Agadir Crisis. As a result, the cruise only went into the Baltic. Ostfriesland and the rest of the fleet then fell into a pattern of individual ship, squadron, and full fleet exercises over the next two years of peacetime. Ostfriesland won the 1912/1913 Schiesspreis—the Kaiser's artillery shooting prize—for I Squadron. On 27 January 1913, Konteradmiral (KAdm—Rear Admiral) Wilhelm von Lans replaced Pohl as the squadron commander.

On 14 July 1914, the annual summer cruise to Norway began. During the last peacetime cruise of the Imperial Navy, the fleet conducted drills off Skagen before proceeding to the Norwegian fjords on 25 July. The following day the fleet began to steam back to Germany, as a result of Austria-Hungary's ultimatum to Serbia. On the 27th, the entire fleet assembled off Cape Skadenes before returning to port, where it remained at a heightened state of readiness. War between Austria-Hungary and Serbia broke out on the 28th, and in the span of a week all of the major European powers had joined the conflict. By 29 July Ostfriesland and the rest of I Squadron was back in Wilhelmshaven.

=== World War I ===
The first major naval action in the North Sea, the Battle of Helgoland Bight, took place on 28 August 1914. At 04:30, Helgoland, which was stationed off the heavily fortified island of Wangerooge, received the order to join Ostfriesland and sail out of the harbor. At 05:00, the two battleships met the battered cruisers Frauenlob and Stettin. By 07:30, the ships had returned to port for the night. On the afternoon of 7 September, Ostfriesland and the rest of the High Seas Fleet conducted a training cruise to the island of Heligoland. In October, Ostfriesland was equipped with a pair of 8.8 cm flak guns for anti-air defense.

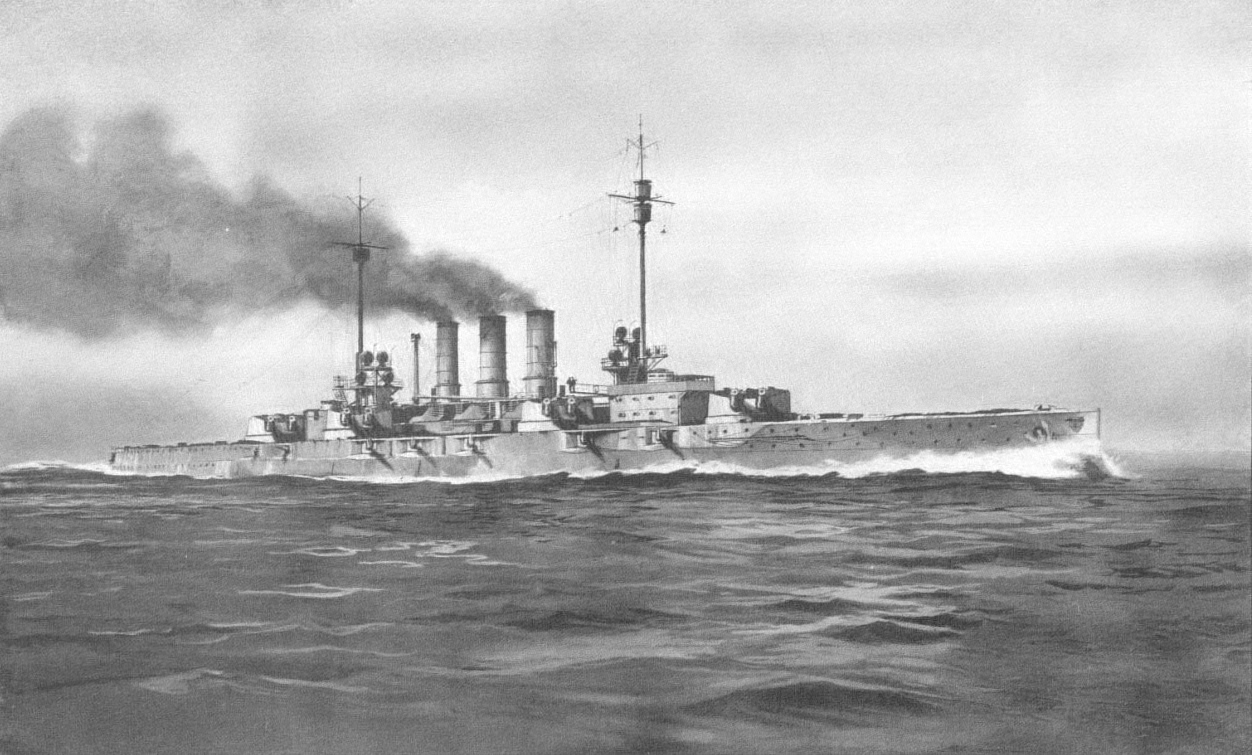
A British recognition drawing of a Helgoland-class battleship

Ostfriesland was present during the first sortie by the German fleet into the North Sea, which took place on 2–3 November 1914. No British forces were encountered during the operation. A second operation followed on 15–16 December. This sortie was the initiation of a strategy adopted by Admiral Friedrich von Ingenohl, the commander of the High Seas Fleet. Ingenohl intended to use the battlecruisers of KAdm Franz von Hipper's I Scouting Group to raid British coastal towns to lure out portions of the Grand Fleet where they could be destroyed by the High Seas Fleet. Early on 15 December the fleet left port to raid the towns of Scarborough, Hartlepool, and Whitby. That evening, the German battle fleet of some twelve dreadnoughts—including Ostfriesland and her three sisters—and eight pre-dreadnoughts came to within 10 nmi (19 km; 12 mi) of an isolated squadron of six British battleships. However, skirmishes between the rival destroyer screens in the darkness convinced Ingenohl that he was faced with the entire Grand Fleet. Under orders from Kaiser Wilhelm II to avoid risking the fleet unnecessarily, Ingenohl broke off the engagement and turned the battle fleet back toward Germany.

The Battle of Dogger Bank, in which Vice Admiral David Beatty's 1st and 2nd Battlecruiser Squadrons ambushed the battlecruisers of I Scouting Group, occurred on 24 January 1915. Ostfriesland and the rest of I Squadron sortied to reinforce the outnumbered German battlecruisers; I Squadron left port at 12:33 CET, (Note: The Germans were on Central European Time, which is one hour ahead of UTC, the time zone commonly used in British works.) along with the pre-dreadnoughts of II Squadron. They were too late, however, and failed to locate any British forces. By 19:05, the fleet had returned to the Schillig Roads outside Wilhelmshaven. In the meantime, the armored cruiser Blücher had been overwhelmed by concentrated British fire and sunk, while the battlecruiser Seydlitz was severely damaged by a fire in one of the ammunition magazines. As a result, Kaiser Wilhelm II removed Ingenohl from his post and replaced him with now-Admiral Pohl on 2 February. VAdm Richard Eckermann replaced Lans on 16 February.

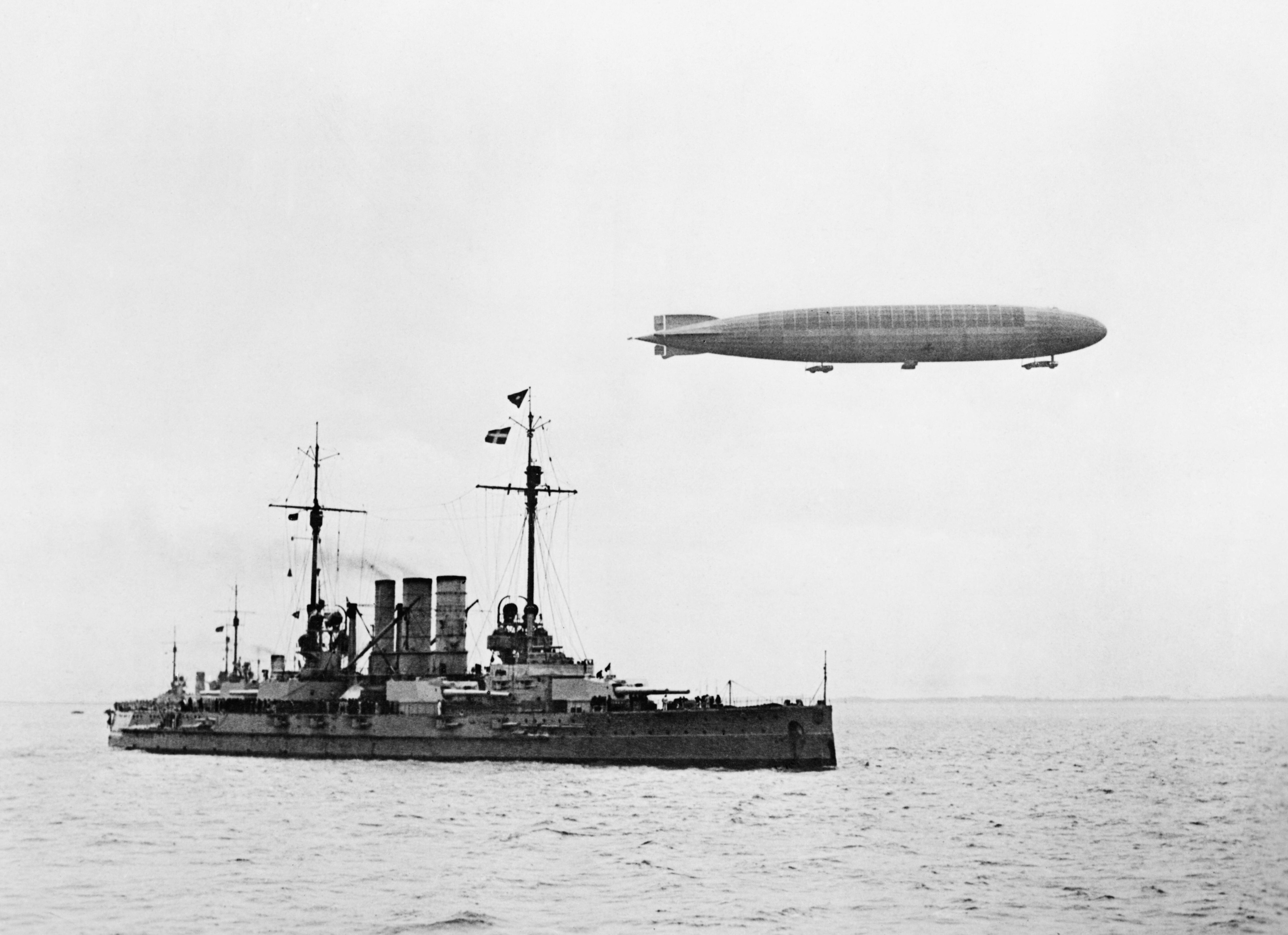
Ostfriesland in 1915 with a zeppelin overhead

The eight I Squadron ships went into the Baltic on 22 February 1915 for unit training, which lasted until 13 March. Following their return to the North Sea, the ships participated in a series of uneventful fleet sorties on 29–30 March, 17–18 April, 21–22 April, 17–18 May, and 29–30 May. In June, Eckermann fell ill and had to be replaced temporarily by KAdm Friedrich Gädeke. Ostfriesland and the rest of the fleet remained in port until 4 August, when I Squadron returned to the Baltic for another round of training maneuvers. That month, KzS Ernst-Oldwig von Natzmer replaced Engelhardt as the ship's commanding officer. From the Baltic, the squadron was attached to the naval force that attempted to sweep the Gulf of Riga of Russian naval forces in August 1915. The assault force included the eight I Squadron battleships, the battlecruisers Von der Tann, Moltke, and Seydlitz, several light cruisers, 32 destroyers and 13 minesweepers. The plan called for channels in Russian minefields to be swept so that the Russian naval presence, which included the pre-dreadnought battleship Slava, could be eliminated. The Germans would then lay minefields of their own to prevent Russian ships from returning to the Gulf. Ostfriesland and the majority of the other big ships of the High Seas Fleet remained outside the Gulf for the entirety of the operation. The dreadnoughts Nassau and Posen were detached on 16 August to escort the minesweepers and to destroy Slava, though they failed to sink the old battleship. After three days, the Russian minefields had been cleared, and the flotilla entered the Gulf on 19 August, but reports of Allied submarines in the area prompted a German withdrawal from the Gulf the following day. By 26 August, I Squadron had returned to Wilhelmshaven. That day, Gädeke was relieved by VAdm Ehrhard Schmidt.

On 23–24 October, the High Seas Fleet undertook its last major offensive operation under Pohl's command, though it ended without contact with British forces. By January 1916 hepatic cancer had weakened Pohl to the point where he was no longer able to carry out his duties, and he was replaced by VAdm Reinhard Scheer in January. Scheer proposed a more aggressive policy designed to force a confrontation with the British Grand Fleet; he received approval from the Kaiser in February. Scheer's first operation was a sweep into the North Sea on 5–7 March, followed by two more on 21–22 March and 25–26 March. During Scheer's next operation, Ostfriesland supported a raid on the English coast on 24 April 1916 conducted by the German battlecruiser force. The battlecruisers left the Jade Estuary at 10:55 and the rest of the High Seas Fleet followed at 13:40. The battlecruiser Seydlitz struck a mine while en route to the target, and had to withdraw. The other battlecruisers bombarded the town of Lowestoft unopposed but, during the approach to Yarmouth, encountered the British cruisers of the Harwich Force. A short gun duel ensued before the Harwich Force withdrew. Reports of British submarines in the area prompted I Scouting Group to retreat. At this point, Scheer, who had been warned of the sortie of the Grand Fleet from its base in Scapa Flow, also withdrew to safer German waters.

==== Battle of Jutland ====
Maps showing the maneuvers of the British (blue) and German (red) fleets on 31 May – 1 June 1916

Ostfriesland was present during the fleet operation that resulted in the battle of Jutland, which took place on 31 May and 1 June 1916. The German fleet again sought to draw out and isolate a portion of the Grand Fleet and destroy it before the main British fleet could retaliate. During the operation, Ostfriesland was the lead ship in I Squadron's I Division and the ninth ship in the line, directly astern of the fleet flagship Friedrich der Grosse and ahead of her sister Thüringen. I Squadron was the center of the German line, behind the eight König- and Kaiser-class battleships of III Squadron. The six elderly pre-dreadnoughts of III and IV Divisions—II Battle Squadron—formed the rear of the formation. Ostfriesland flew the flag of Schmidt, the squadron commander during the battle and Scheer's deputy commander.

Shortly before 16:00, the battlecruisers of I Scouting Group encountered the British 1st Battlecruiser Squadron under the command of David Beatty. The opposing ships began an artillery duel that saw the destruction of Indefatigable, shortly after 17:00, and Queen Mary, less than half an hour later. By this time, the German battlecruisers were steaming south to draw the British ships toward the main body of the High Seas Fleet. At 17:30, the crew of the leading German battleship, König, spotted both I Scouting Group and the 1st Battlecruiser Squadron approaching. The German battlecruisers were steaming to starboard, while the British ships steamed to port. At 17:45, Scheer ordered a two-point turn to port to bring his ships closer to the British battlecruisers and, a minute later, the order to open fire was given. (Note: The compass can be divided into 32 points, each corresponding to 11.25 degrees. A two-point turn to port would alter the ships' course by 22.5 degrees.)

While the leading battleships engaged the British battlecruiser squadron, Ostfriesland and ten other battleships fired on the British 2nd Light Cruiser Squadron. Ostfriesland, Kaiser, and Nassau engaged the cruiser Southampton, though only Nassau scored a hit. After about 15 minutes, Ostfriesland shifted fire to Birmingham and Nottingham, though again failed to hit her targets. Shortly after 19:15, the British dreadnought Warspite came into range; Ostfriesland opened fire at 19:25 with her main battery guns, at ranges of 10,800 to 15,000 yd (9,900 to 13,700 m). Ostfriesland claimed hits from her third and fourth salvos. Warspite was hit by a total of thirteen heavy shells during this period.

By 20:15, the German battle line had faced the entire deployed Grand Fleet a second time. Scheer ordered a 180-degree turn at 20:17, which was covered by a charge by the battlecruiser squadron and a torpedo-boat attack. In order to hasten the maneuver, Schmidt ordered Ostfriesland to turn immediately without waiting for Thüringen behind him. This move caused some difficulty for the III Squadron ships ahead, though the ships quickly returned to their stations. At around 23:30, the German fleet reorganized into the night cruising formation. Ostfriesland was the eighth ship, stationed toward the front of the 24-ship line. An hour later, the leading units of the German line encountered British light forces and a violent firefight at close range ensued. Sometime around 01:10, the armored cruiser Black Prince stumbled into the German line. Thüringen illuminated the vessel with her spotlights and poured salvos of 30.5 cm rounds into the ship. Ostfriesland fired with her 15 cm guns and Kaiser fired both 30.5 cm and 15 cm guns. In the span of less than a minute, two massive explosions tore the cruiser apart and killed the entire 857-man crew.

Despite the ferocity of the night fighting, the High Seas Fleet punched through the British destroyer forces and reached Horns Reef by 4:00 on 1 June. At 06:20, however, Ostfriesland struck a mine, previously laid by the destroyer HMS Abdiel on 4 May, on her starboard side. The ship hauled out of line, as the explosion was initially thought to have been a torpedo fired by a submarine. Ostfriesland fell behind the fleet and steamed at slow speed, screened by the destroyers V3, V5, and briefly by G11. By 10:40, the battleship had increased speed to 15 knots (28 km/h; 17 mph). Her anti-submarine escort was eventually reinforced by a floatplane, which spotted what it believed to be a British submarine at 12:20. Ostfriesland turned away, which caused the torpedo bulkhead, damaged slightly by the mine explosion, to tear open. More water entered the ship and caused a 4.75 degree list to starboard, forcing Ostfriesland to reduce speed again. The ship requested assistance from a pumping ship at 14:20, and by 14:45 the flooding was under control and the ship passed the Outer Jade Lightship. She was able to increase speed gradually to 10 knots (19 km/h; 12 mph), and at 18:15 she reached port in Wilhelmshaven. The mine tore a hole that measured 40 ft × 16 ft (12.2 m × 4.9 m) and allowed 500 t (490 long tons) of water into the ship. Further flooding occurred after the torpedo bulkhead damage at 12:20, though the full damage report has not survived. Ostfriesland was drydocked in Wilhelmshaven for repairs, which lasted until 26 July. In the course of the battle, Ostfriesland fired 111 rounds from her main battery, 101 shells from her 15 cm guns, and a single 8.8 cm shell. The only damage sustained was the mine that was struck on the morning of 1 June, which killed one man and wounded ten.

==== Later operations ====
On 18 August 1916, Scheer attempted a repeat of the 31 May operation. The two serviceable German battlecruisers, Moltke and Von der Tann, supported by three dreadnoughts, were to bombard the coastal town of Sunderland in an attempt to draw out and destroy Beatty's battlecruisers. (Note: Derfflinger and Seydlitz had been seriously damaged at the Battle of Jutland, and Lützow had been sunk.) The rest of the fleet, including Ostfriesland, would trail behind and provide cover. On the approach to the English coast during the action of 19 August 1916, Scheer turned north after receiving a false report from a zeppelin about a British unit in the area. As a result, the bombardment was not carried out, and by 14:35, Scheer had been warned of the Grand Fleet's approach and so turned his forces around and retreated to German ports.

On 25–26 September, Ostfriesland and the rest of I Squadron provided support for a sweep out to the Terschelling Bank conducted by the II Führer der Torpedoboote (Leader of Torpedo Boats). Scheer conducted another fleet operation on 18–20 October in the direction of the Dogger Bank. The operation led to a brief action on 19 October, during which a British submarine torpedoed the cruiser München. The failure of the operation (coupled with the action of 19 August) convinced the German naval command to abandon its aggressive fleet strategy in favor of a resumption of the unrestricted submarine warfare campaign.

For the majority of 1917, Ostfriesland was assigned to guard duty in the German Bight. During Operation Albion, the amphibious assault on the Russian-held islands in the Gulf of Riga, Ostfriesland and her three sisters were moved to the Danish Straits to block any possible British attempt to intervene. The German naval forces assigned directly to Operation Albion were commanded by Schmidt, so KAdm Gottfried von Dalwigk zu Lichtenfels temporarily commanded I Squadron in his absence. On 28 October the four ships arrived in Putzig Wiek, and from there steamed to Arensburg on the 29th. On 2 November the operation was completed and Ostfriesland and her sisters began the voyage back to the North Sea. In March 1918, Natzmer was replaced as the ship's commander by KzS Hans Herr.

On 23–24 April, the ship participated in an abortive fleet operation to attack British convoys to Norway. German attacks on shipping between Britain and Norway, which had begun in late 1917, prompted the Grand Fleet to begin escorting convoys with a detached battle squadron. This decision presented the Germans with the opportunity for which they had been waiting the entire war: a portion of the numerically stronger Grand Fleet was separated and could be isolated and destroyed. I Scouting Group, II Scouting Group, and II Torpedo-Boat Flotilla, would attack one of the large convoys while the rest of the High Seas Fleet would stand by, ready to attack the British battle squadron when it intervened. The Germans failed to locate the convoy, which had in fact sailed the day before the fleet left port. As a result, the Germans broke off the operation and returned to port.

Ostfriesland, Thüringen, Nassau, and the aviso Blitz were formed into a special unit for Operation Schlußstein, a planned occupation of Kronstadt and St. Petersburg, the latter the capital of Russia. The four ships reached the Baltic on 10 August, where they were joined by the light cruiser Stralsund. But the operation was postponed and eventually canceled. The special unit was dissolved on 21 August and the battleships were back in Wilhelmshaven on the 23rd. On 2 October, the six remaining battleships of I Squadron sortied to cover the withdrawal of the Flanders Flotilla to Germany. (Note: Rheinland had been badly damaged by an accidental grounding earlier that year and Westfalen had been withdrawn from active service for use as an artillery training ship.)

=== The end of the war ===
Ostfriesland and her three sisters were to have taken part in a final fleet action at the end of October 1918, just over 2 weeks before the Armistice was signed. The bulk of the High Seas Fleet was to have sortied from its base in Wilhelmshaven to engage the British Grand Fleet; Scheer—by now the Großadmiral (Grand Admiral) of the fleet—intended to inflict as much damage as possible on the British navy, to improve Germany's bargaining position, despite the expected casualties. But many of the war-weary sailors felt that the operation would disrupt the peace process and prolong the war. On the morning of 29 October 1918, the order was given to sail from Wilhelmshaven the following day. Starting on the night of the 29th, sailors on Thüringen and then on several other battleships mutinied. The unrest ultimately forced Hipper and Scheer to cancel the operation. Informed of the situation, the Kaiser stated "I no longer have a navy". On 16 December, Ostfriesland was decommissioned and used as a barracks ship.

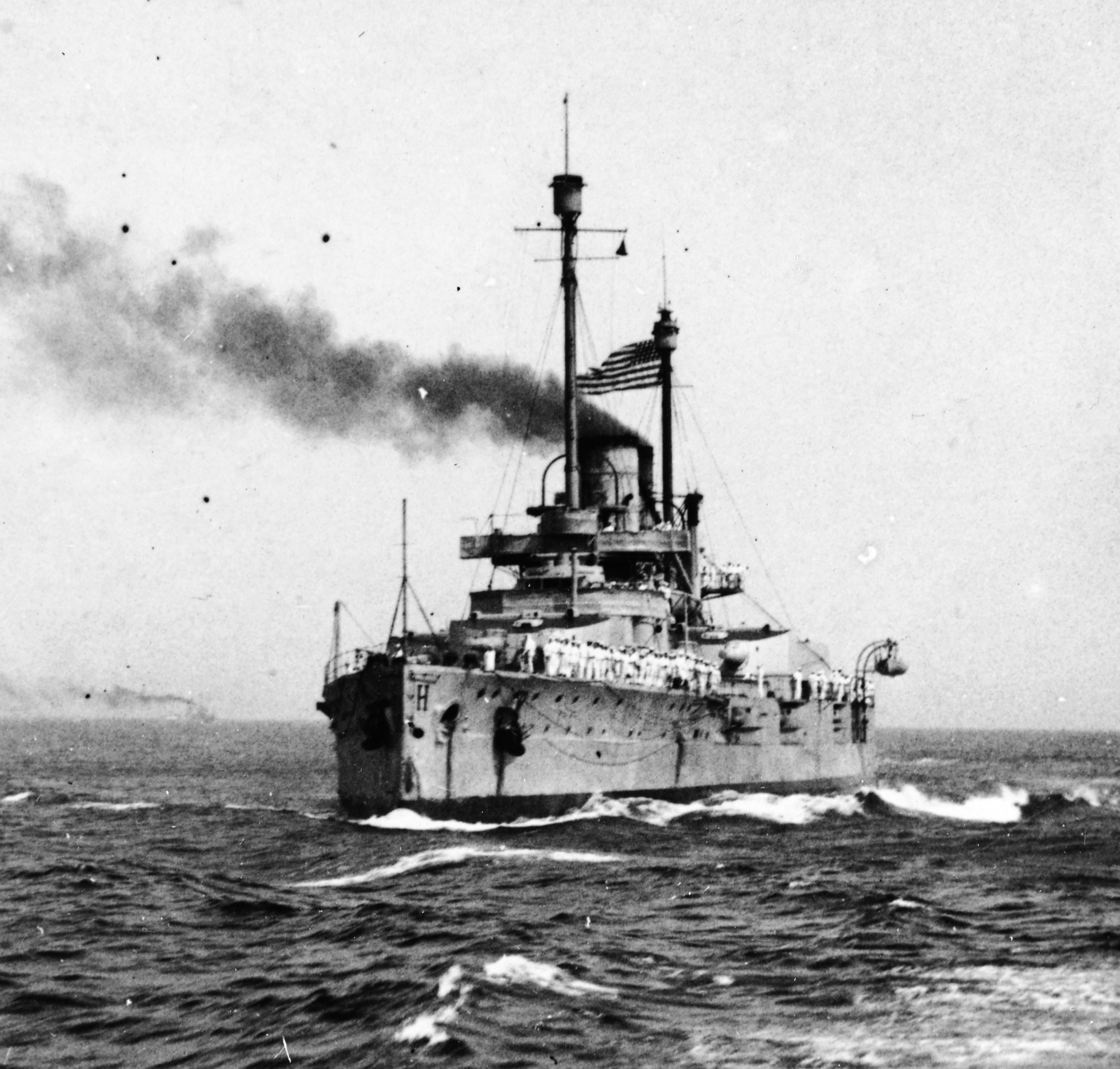
Ostfriesland under United States flag

Following the German collapse that had resulted in the Armistice of 11 November 1918, a significant portion of the High Seas Fleet was interned in Scapa Flow. Ostfriesland and her three sisters were not among the ships listed for internment, so they remained at German ports. Under the terms of the Treaty of Versailles that formally ended the war in June 1919, Oldenburg and the other dreadnoughts that had remained in Germany were to be surrendered to the Allies under Article 185 as prizes of war. Negotiations between the Allies over which country received what vessels, and what those ships could be used for began in November. Ostfriesland was struck from the German naval list on 5 November. While final decisions were still being made, the Allies decided that the ships in question were to sail to either a British or French port, and accordingly, on 1 April 1920, Ostfriesland and Nassau sailed for Rosyth, Britain, arriving on 5 April.

She was ceded to the United States as war reparations, commissioned on 7 April at Rosyth as USS Ostfriesland. On 9 April an American crew arrived to bring her to the US, and the ship got underway on 17 June in company with the ex-German cruiser Frankfurt and three torpedo boats that had also been surrendered as war prizes. The ships were escorted by the transport ship USS Hancock and three minesweepers. The flotilla initially stopped at Brest, France, remaining there until 13 July. Ostfriesland took Frankfurt under tow for the voyage to the United States, which included a stop in the Azores, and ended at Sandy Hook on 9 August. Ostfriesland thereafter sailed to New York, where she decommissioned on 20 September 1920. Preparations were made at the New York Navy Yard to ready the ship for weapons tests, including removing unnecessary equipment and sealing watertight compartments to maximize the ship's resistance to underwater damage.

=== US bombing target ===
In July 1921, the United States Navy and Army Air Service conducted a series of bombing tests off Cape Henry, led by General Billy Mitchell. The targets included demobilized American and former German warships, including the old battleship Iowa, the cruiser Frankfurt, and finally Ostfriesland on 20 July. At 13:30 ET, the first attack wave, armed with 230 lb (100 kg) bombs, struck the stationary ship. Eight of thirty-three bombs found their mark, after which the ship was inspected. The second wave was also armed with 230 lb bombs, and the third and fourth carried 600 lb (270 kg) bombs. Five 600 lb bombs found their mark, but little damage was done to the ship's topside. The bombs that nearly missed the ship, however, had done significant underwater damage to the hull, which allowed some flooding and created a list of five degrees to port and three additional feet of draft at the stern. The bombing schedule was interrupted by a storm in the late afternoon.

Early on the morning of 21 July, the fifth wave of bombers began their attack. At 08:52, the first Army bomber dropped a 1,000 lb (450 kg) bomb that hit the ship; four more bombers followed and scored two further hits. Inspectors again went aboard Ostfriesland following the fifth attack and noted that the hits had not seriously damaged the ship, though one had created a large hole on her starboard side that allowed further flooding. By noon, she was down five feet at the stern and one foot at the bow. At 12:19, the next attack wave, equipped with 2,000 lb (910 kg) bombs, struck. Six bombs were dropped, none of which hit, though three detonated very close to the hull. At 12:30, Ostfriesland began to sink rapidly by the stern and the list to port increased dramatically. At 12:40, the ship rolled over and sank. The results of the tests were widely publicized and Mitchell became both a national hero and the "infallible prophet of aviation".

The leadership of the US Navy, however, was outraged by Mitchell's handling of the tests; the 2,000 lb bombs had not been sanctioned by the Navy, which had set the rules for the engagement. Mitchell's bombers had also not allowed inspectors aboard the ship between bombing runs as stipulated by the Navy. The joint Army–Navy report on the tests, issued a month later and signed by General John J. Pershing, stated that "the battleship is still the backbone of the fleet." Mitchell wrote his own, contradictory account of the tests, which was then leaked to the press. The sinking of the battleship sparked great controversy in the American public sphere; Mitchell's supporters exaggerated the significance of the tests by falsely claiming Ostfriesland to be an unsinkable "super-battleship" and that "old sea dogs ... wept aloud." Senator William Borah argued that the tests had rendered battleships obsolete. Mitchell was widely supported in the press, though his increasingly combative tactics eventually resulted in a court-martial for insubordination that forced him to retire from the military.

Sinking off the Virginia Capes
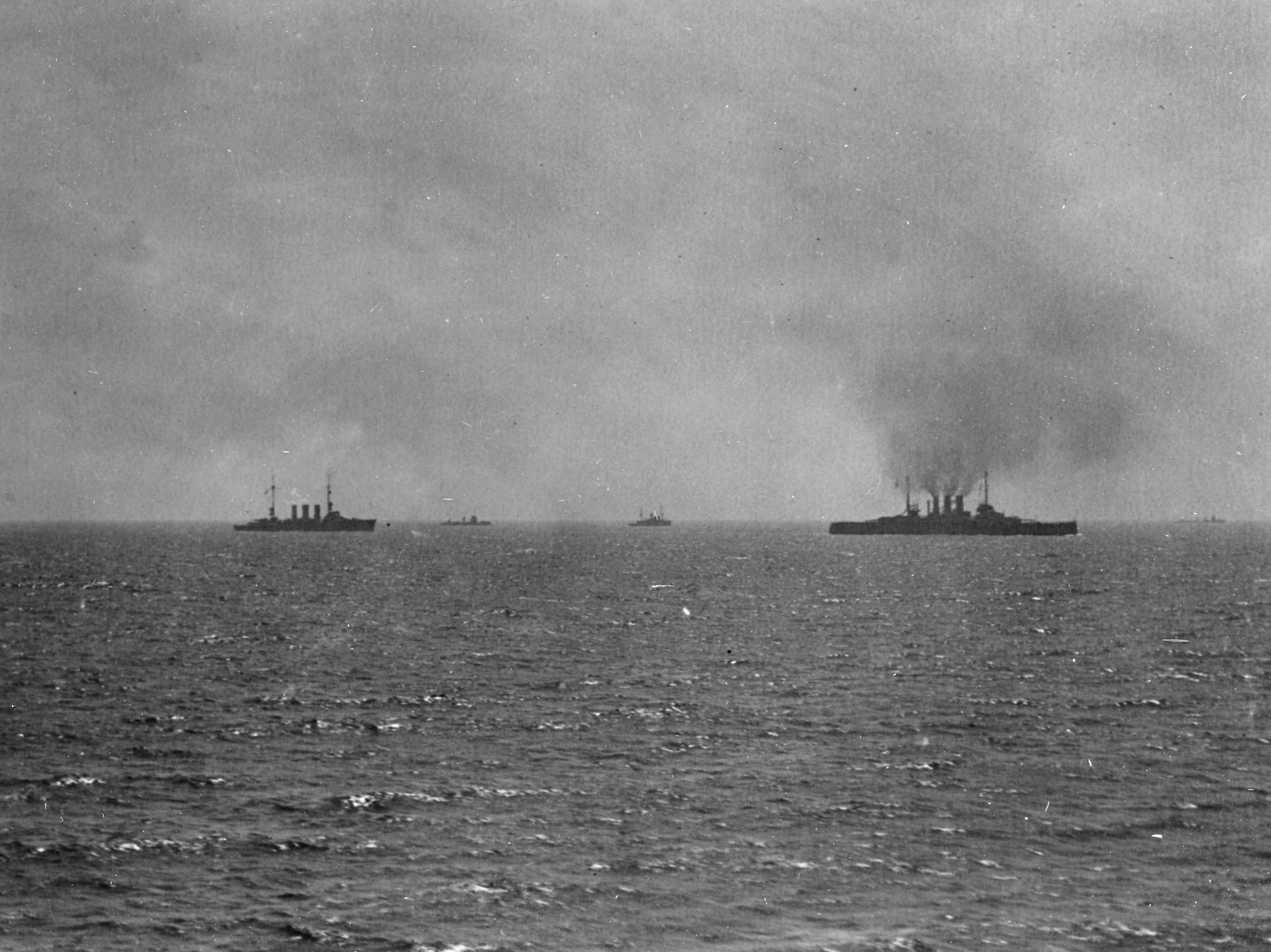
Ostfriesland, Frankfurt, and other former German ships off the Virginia Capes, July 1921

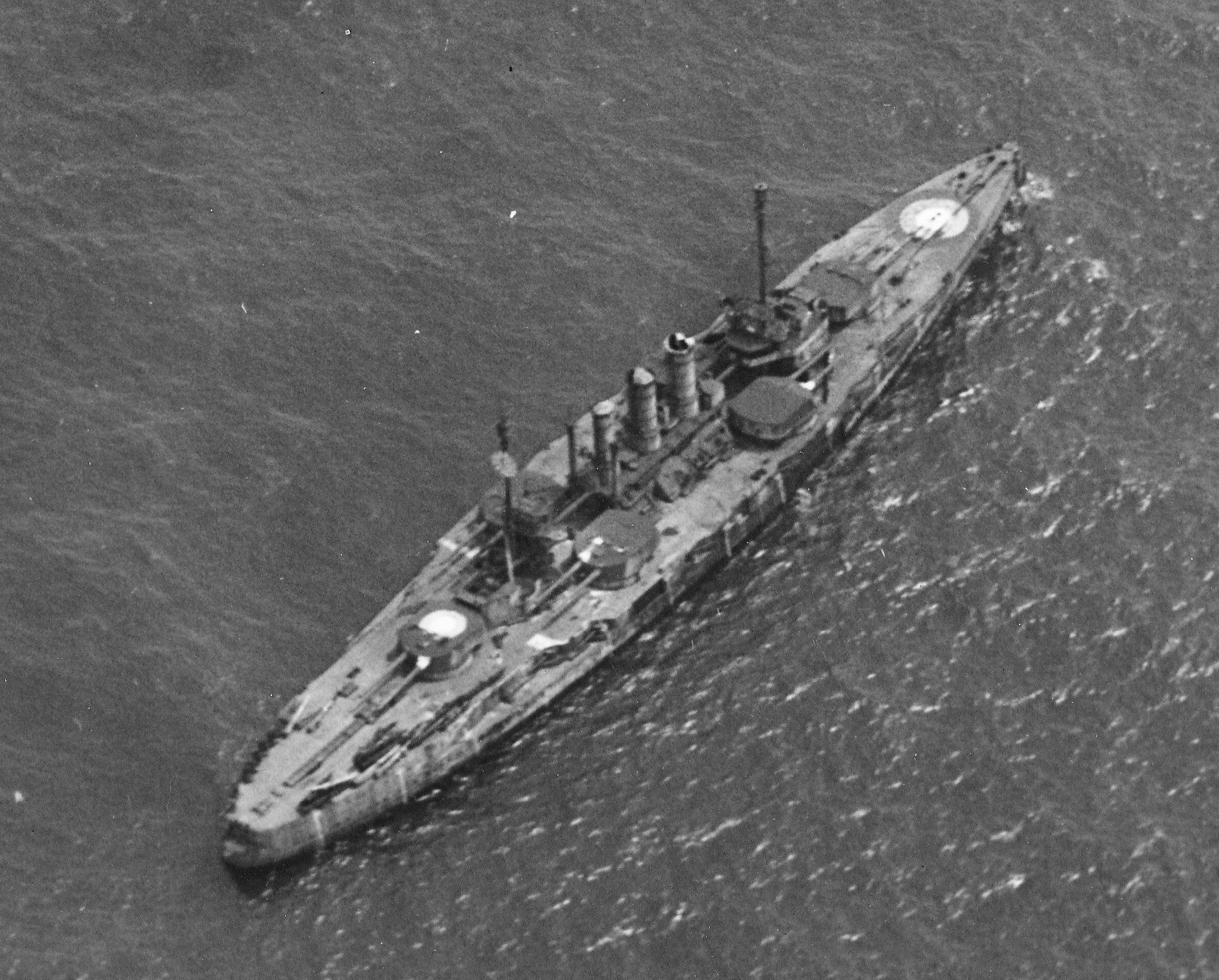
Ostfriesland at anchor prior to the tests

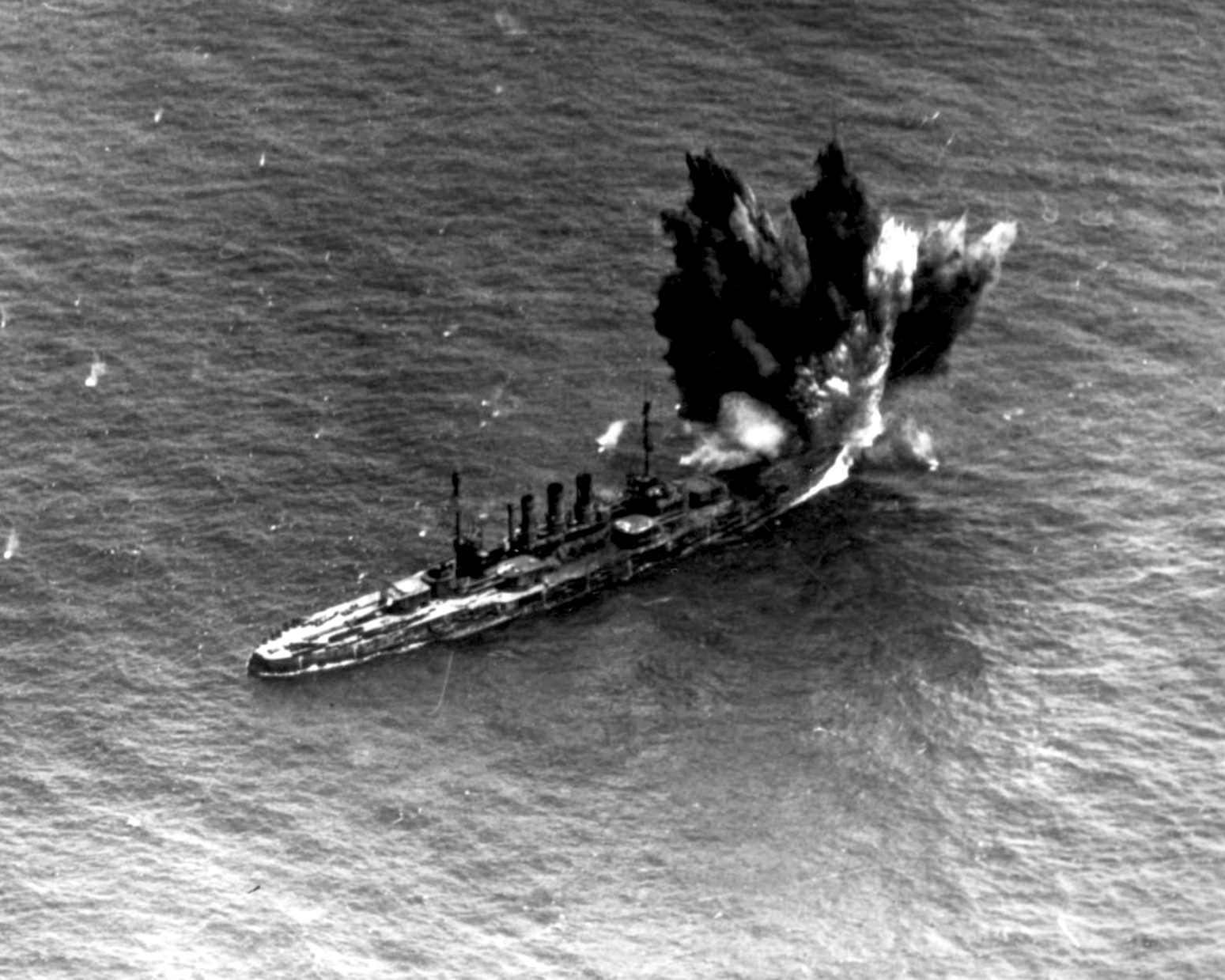
A bomb explodes off Ostfriesland's port bow

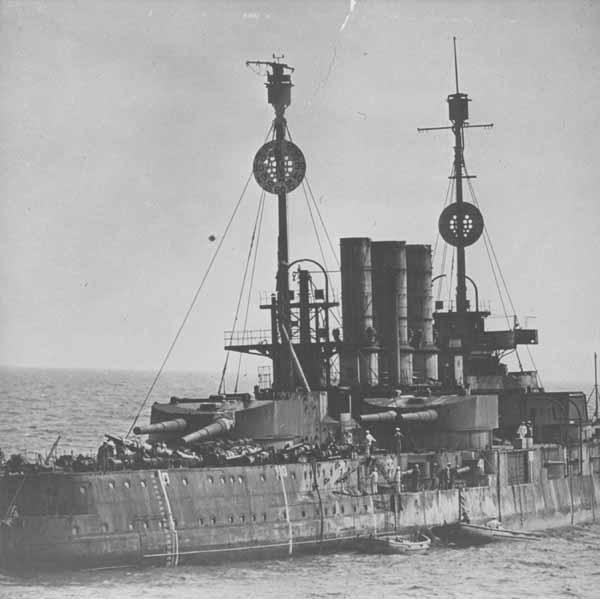
Inspection teams aboard the ship, evaluating damage

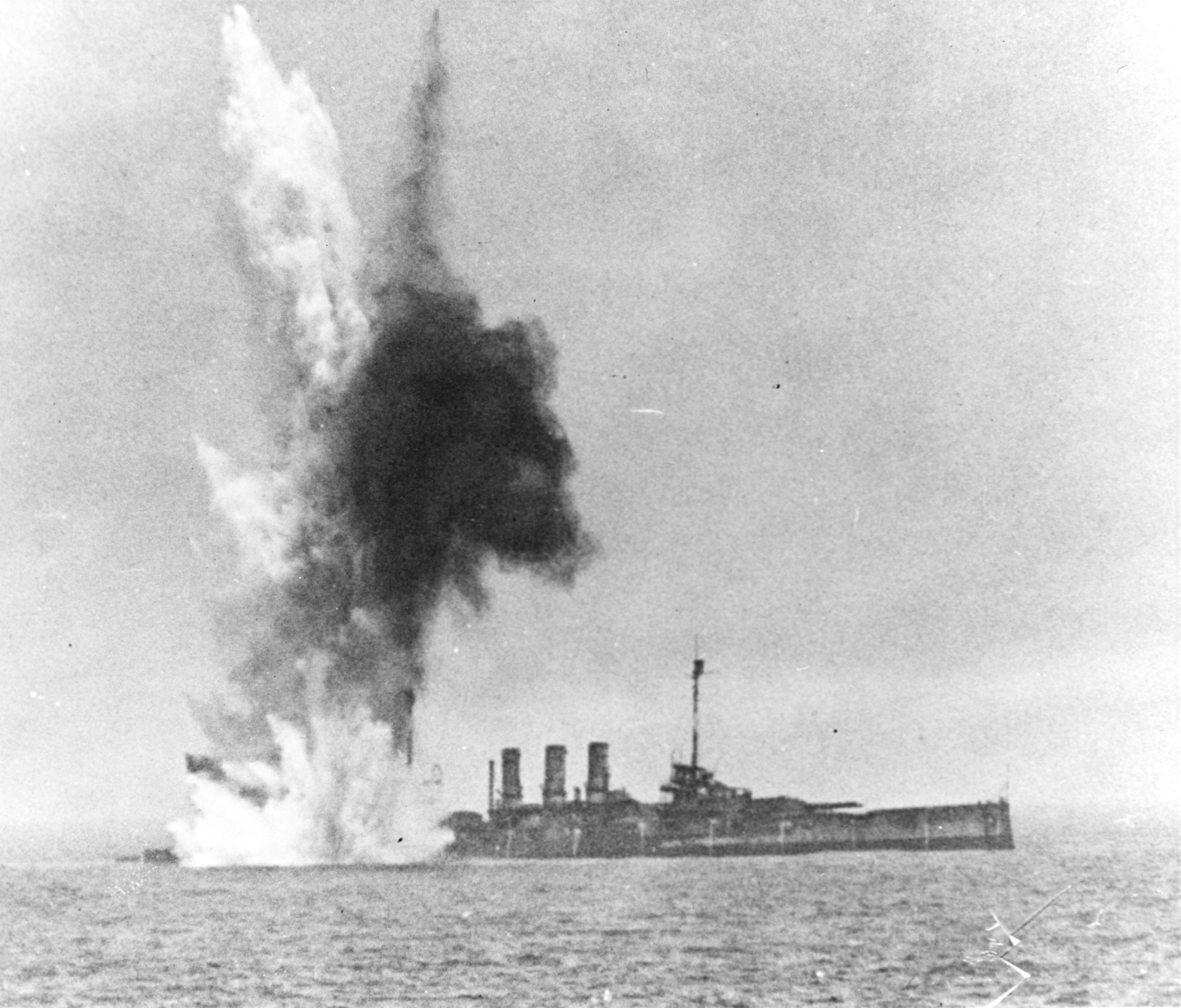
The ship already settling by the stern, another bomb explodes underwater

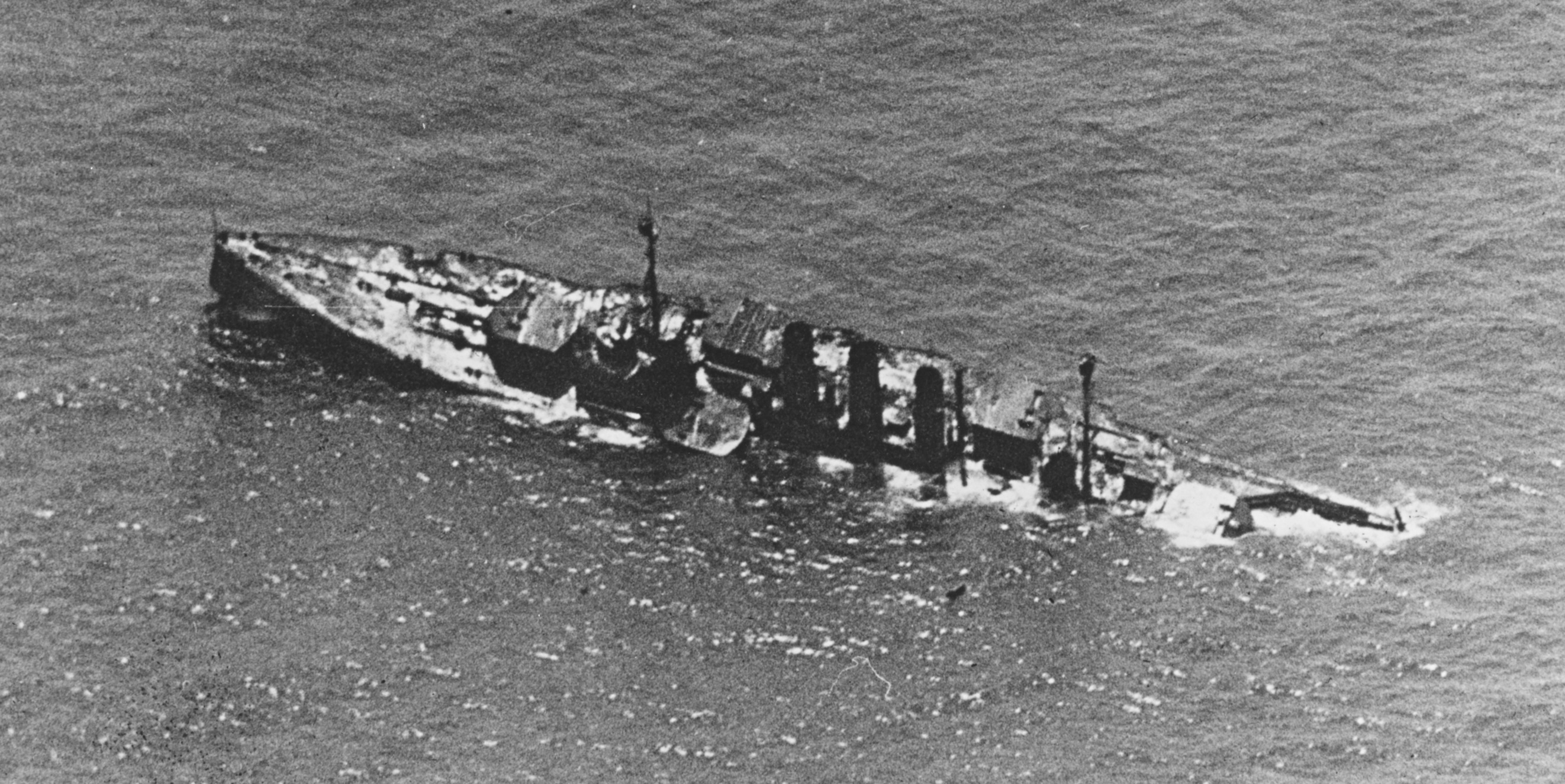
Ostfriesland sinking by the stern
