= SMS V5 (1913) =

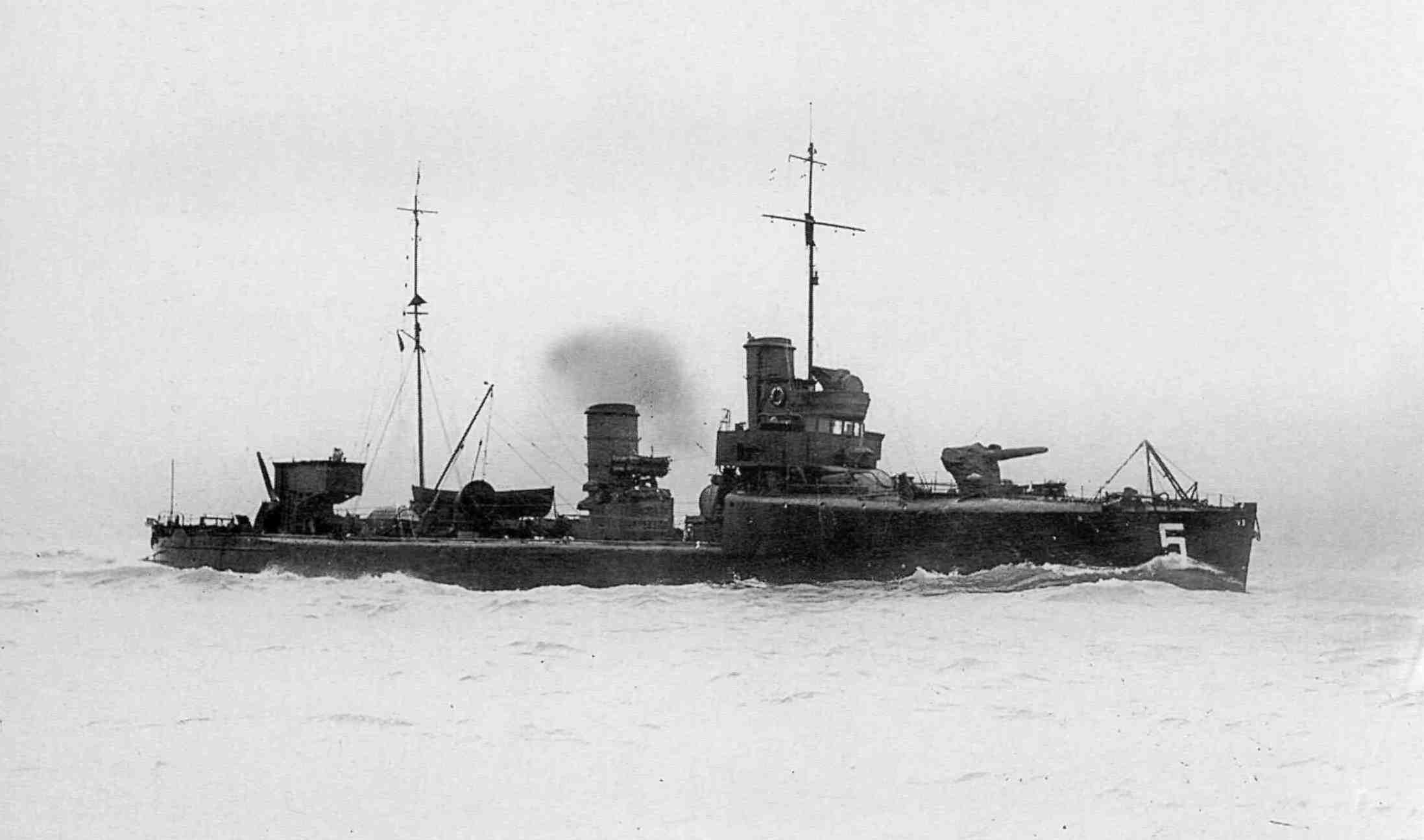
- V5 after modernisation in the 1920s

History

German Empire
- Name: V5
- Builder: AG Vulcan Stettin, Germany
- Launched: 25 April 1913
- Commissioned: 17 July 1913
- Fate: Stricken 18 November 1929

General characteristics
- Displacement: 697 t (686 long tons)
- Length: 71.1 m (233 ft 3 in) oa
- Beam: 7.6 m (24 ft 11 in)
- Draft: 3.11 m (10 ft 2 in)
- Propulsion: 4× water-tube boilers; 2× steam turbines; 17,000 metric horsepower (17,000 shp; 13,000 kW)
- Speed: 32 knots (59.3 km/h; 36.8 mph)
- Range: 1,190 nmi (2,200 km; 1,370 mi) at 17 knots (31 km/h; 20 mph)
- Complement: 74 officers and sailors
- Armament: 2 x 8.8 cm (3.5 in)/30 guns; 4 x 50 cm (20 in) torpedo tubes

SMS V5 (Note: "SMS" stands for "Seiner Majestät Schiff" (German: His Majesty's Ship)) (Note: The "V" in V5 denotes the shipyard at which she was built, in this case AG Vulcan.) was a V1-class torpedo boat of the Imperial German Navy. The ship was built by AG Vulcan, completing in 1913. She served in the First World War with the German High Seas Fleet, taking part in the Battle of the Heligoland Bight in 1914, the Battle of Dogger Bank in 1915 and the Battle of Jutland in 1916. She was retained by the post-war German Navy and was stricken in 1929 and scrapped.

== Construction and design ==
In 1911, the Imperial German Navy placed orders for a flotilla of 12 torpedo boats as part of its shipbuilding programme for that year, with one half flotilla of six ordered from AG Vulcan, and six from Germaniawerft. (Note: The Imperial German Navy's practice was to split a year's orders into half-flotillas of six torpedo boats from different builders, to differing detailed design.) The 1911 torpedo boats were smaller than those ordered in recent years in order to be more manoeuvrable and so work better with the fleet, which resulted in the numbering series for torpedo boats being restarted. The reduction in size resulted in the ships' seaworthiness being adversely affected, with the 1911 torpedo boats and the similar craft of the 1912 programme acquiring the disparaging nickname "Admiral Lans' cripples".

In July 1912, shortly before the outbreak of the First Balkan War, two of the under-construction 1911 Vulcan torpedo boats, V5 and V6 were sold to Greece as part of an urgent programme to build up the strength of the Greek Navy, becoming Keravnos and Nea Genea. Two replacement ships were ordered for the German navy, sharing the same names as the two sold ships. The new V5, yard number 319, was launched from Vulcan's Stettin, Prussia (now Szczecin in Poland) shipyard on 25 April 1913 and commissioned on 17 July that year.

The ship was 71.1 metres (233 ft 3 in) long overall and 70.2 metres (230 ft 4 in) at the waterline, with a beam of 7.6 metres (24 ft 11 in) and a draught of 3.11 metres (10 ft 2 in). Displacement was 569 tonnes (560 long tons) normal and 697 tonnes (686 long tons) deep load. Three coal-fired and one oil-fired water-tube boilers fed steam to two direct-drive steam turbines rated at 17,000 metric horsepower (17,000 shp; 13,000 kW), giving a design speed of 32 knots (59 km/h; 37 mph). 107 tonnes (105 long tons) of coal and 78 tonnes (77 long tons) of oil were carried, giving a range of 1,190 nautical miles (2,200 km; 1,370 mi) at 17 knots (31 km/h; 20 mph) or 490 nautical miles (910 km; 560 mi) at 29 knots (54 km/h; 33 mph).

Armament consisted of two 8.8 cm (3.5 in) SK L/30 naval guns (Note: In Imperial German Navy gun nomenclature, the L/30 denotes the length of the gun. In this case, the L/30 gun is 30 caliber, meaning that the gun is 30 times as long as it is in diameter.) in single mounts fore and aft, together with four 50 cm (19.7 in) torpedo tubes with one reload torpedo carried. Up to 18 mines could be carried. In 1916 the L/30 guns were replaced by more powerful 8.8 cm (3.5 in) SK L/45 guns. In 1921 she was rearmed with two 10.5 cm SK L/45 naval guns and two 50 cm torpedo tubes, and was fitted with new boilers. The ship had a crew of 74 officers and other ranks.

== Service ==
In May 1914, V5 was a member of the 9th Half-Flotilla, 5th Torpedo Boat Flotilla.

=== First World War ===
On 28 August 1914, a British force of destroyers and cruisers supported by battlecruisers made a sortie into the Heligoland Bight in order to ambush German torpedo boats on patrol, which caused the Battle of Heligoland Bight. The 5th Torpedo Boat Flotilla, including V5, were sent out from Heligoland to investigate sightings of British submarines (which were deployed as bait to draw out German ships), and ran into several British destroyers. The Flotilla then turned away to try and escape the trap, but the torpedo boat V1, which along with S13 could not make full speed and lagged behind the rest of the flotilla, was hit by British shells before the arrival of the German cruiser Stettin allowed the 5th Flotilla to escape. In total, however, three German light cruisers (Ariadne, Cöln and Mainz) and one torpedo boat of the German outer screen (V187) had been sunk.

On 23 January 1915, a German force of Battlecruisers and light cruisers, escorted by torpedo boats, and commanded by Admiral Franz von Hipper, made a sortie to attack British fishing boats on the Dogger Bank. V1, part of the 9th Torpedo Boat Half-Flotilla of the 5th Torpedo Boat Flotilla, formed part of the escort for Hipper's force. British Naval Intelligence was warned of the raid by radio messages decoded by Room 40, and sent out the Battlecruiser Force from Rosyth, commanded by Admiral Beatty aboard Lion and the Harwich Force of light cruisers and destroyers, to intercept the German force. The British and German Forces met on the morning of 24 January in the Battle of Dogger Bank. On sighting the British, Hipper ordered his ships to head south-east to escape the British, who set off in pursuit. V5, along with sister ship V1 and the torpedo boat S178 lagged behind the rest of the German force owing to engine troubles. Under heavy fire from the British ships, V5's commander, believing that his ship could not survive much longer, decided to launch a torpedo attack against the British battle line. V5 launched two torpedoes, neither of which hit their targets, but shortly after V5's attack, Admiral Beatty ordered the British battlecruisers to alter course away from the German line after sighting an apparent periscope. While no submarines were present, it is possible that one of V5's torpedoes, breaking surface at the end of its run, was mistaken for a periscope. The armoured cruiser Blücher was disabled by British shells and was sunk, but the rest of the German force escaped, with the German battlecruiser Seydlitz and the British battlecruiser Lion badly damaged.

On 21 June, V5 was protecting minesweepers west of the Arum Bank in the German Bight when she briefly sighted a hostile submarine, although attempts to direct aircraft against the submarine failed.

At the Battle of Jutland on 31 May–1 June 1916, V5 was part of the 10th Half-Flotilla, 5th Torpedo Boat Flotilla, operating in support of the main German battle fleet. At the Battle of Jutland on 31 May–1 June 1916, V3 was part of the 9th Half-Flotilla, 5th Torpedo Boat Flotilla, operating in support of the main German battle fleet. From about 20:15 CET (19:15 GMT), the German torpedo boat flotillas launched a series of torpedo attacks against the British battle line in order to cover the German fleet's turn away from the British. First to attack were the 6th and 9th Flotillas, followed by the 3rd Flotilla. At 20:38, the 5th Flotilla started an attack run, but it was unable to find the British battleline due to poor visibility caused by fog and smoke, and the attack was aborted. During the night action, the 5th Flotilla was ordered to search for and attack the British fleet, but failed to encounter the British battleships. In the morning of 1 June, when the German battleship Ostfriesland stuck a mine, V5, along with V3 and G11, screened the damaged Ostfriesland as she returned to port. V5 was undamaged.

In 1918, V5 served in an escort flotilla.

=== Postwar operations ===
V5 survived the war, and was one of the twelve destroyers (with four more in reserve) that the Reichsmarine was allowed to retain under the Treaty of Versailles. (Note: Although treated as destroyers under the treaty, V5 and other ships of her class were always referred to as torpedo boats by the Germans.) In early 1923, V5 was serving in the North Sea. She was stricken on 18 November 1929 and sold for scrap on 25 March 1930 and was broken up at Wilhelmshaven.

== Bibliography ==
- Campbell, John (1998). Jutland: An Analysis of the Fighting. London: Conway Maritime Press. ISBN 0-85177-750-3.
- Dodson, Aidan (2019). "Beyond the Kaiser: The IGN's Destroyers and Torpedo Boats After 1918". In Jordan, John (ed.). Warship 2019. Oxford, UK: Osprey Publishing. pp. 129–144. ISBN 978-1-4728-3595-6.
- Gardiner, Robert; Chesneau, Roger, eds. (1980). Conway's All The World's Fighting Ships 1922–1946. London: Conway Maritime Press. ISBN 0-85177-146-7.
- Gardiner, Robert; Gray, Randal, eds. (1985). Conway's All The World's Fighting Ships 1906–1921. London: Conway Maritime Press. ISBN 0-85177-245-5.
- Gröner, Erich (1983). Die deutschen Kriegsschiffe 1815–1945: Band 2: Torpedoboote, Zerstörer, Schnelleboote, Minensuchboote, Minenräumboote (in German). Koblenz, Germany: Bernard & Graefe Verlag. ISBN 3-7637-4801-6.
- Groos, O. (1923). Der Krieg in der Nordsee: Dritter Band: Von Ende November 1914 bis Unfang Februar 1915. Der Krieg zur See: 1914–1918. Berlin: Verlag von E. S. Mittler und Sohn – via National Library of Estonia.
- Groos, O. (1924). Der Krieg in der Nordsee: Vierter Band: Von Unfang Februar bis Dezember 1915. Der Krieg zur See: 1914–1918. Berlin: Verlag von E. S. Mittler und Sohn – via National Library of Estonia.
- Massie, Robert K. (2007). Castles of Steel: Britain, Germany and the Winning of the Great War at Sea. London: Vintage Books. ISBN 978-0-099-52378-9.
- Monograph No. 11: Heligoland Bight—The Action of August 28, 1914 (PDF). Naval Staff Monographs (Historical). Vol. III. The Naval Staff, Training and Staff Duties Division. 1921. pp. 110–166. OCLC 220734221.
- Rangeliste der Kaiserlisch-Deutschen Marine für das Jahr 1914 (in German). Berlin: Ernst Siegfried Mittler und Sohn. 1914.
