= SMS V3 =

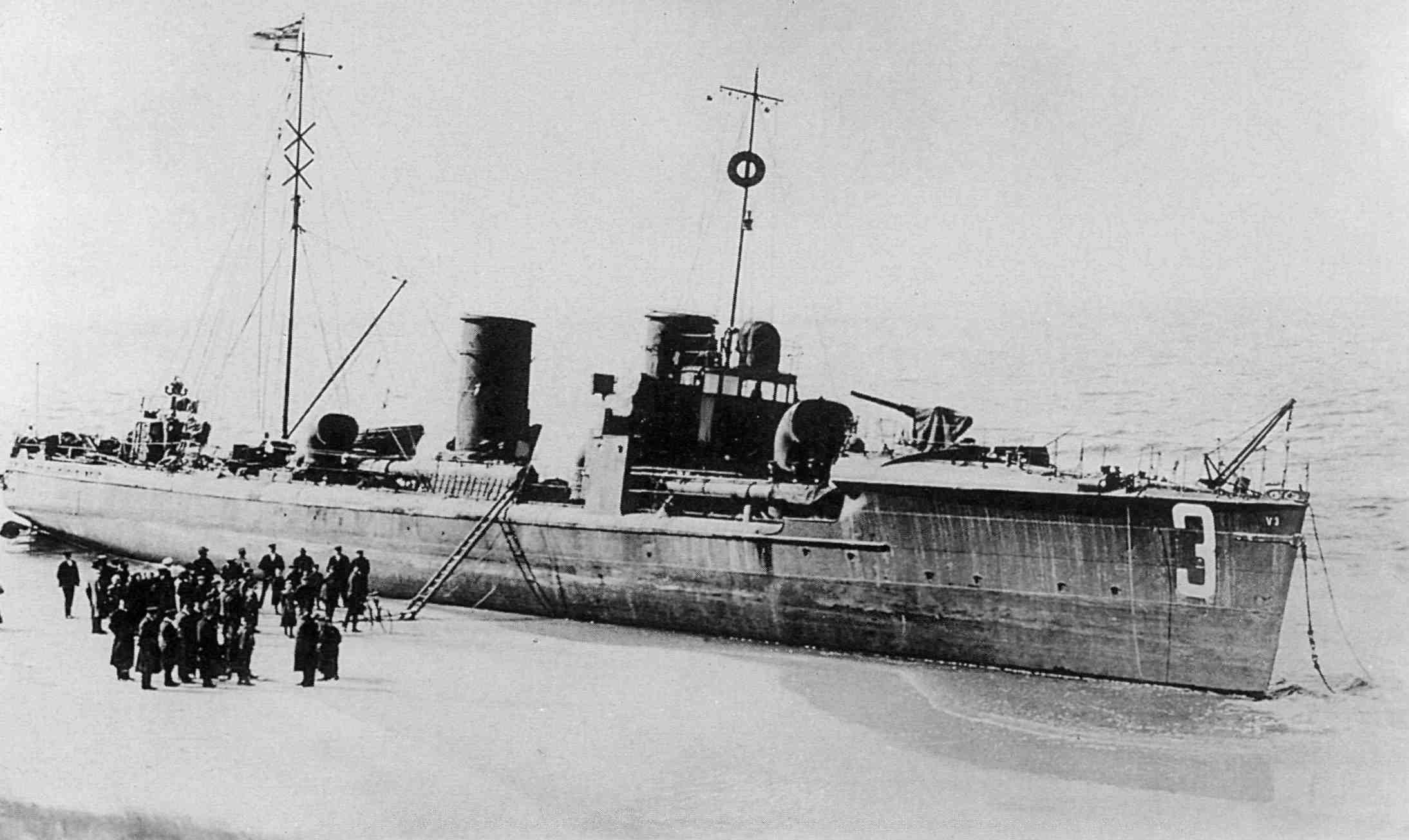

History

German Empire
- Name: V3
- Ordered: 1911
- Builder: AG Vulcan Stettin, Germany
- Launched: 14 November 1911
- Commissioned: 2 May 1912
- Fate: Stricken 18 November 1929

General characteristics
- Displacement: 697 t (686 long tons)
- Length: 71.1 m (233 ft 3 in) oa
- Beam: 7.6 m (24 ft 11 in)
- Draft: 3.11 m (10 ft 2 in)
- Propulsion: 4× water-tube boilers; 2× steam turbines; 17,000 metric horsepower (17,000 shp; 13,000 kW)
- Speed: 32 knots (59.3 km/h; 36.8 mph)
- Range: 1,190 nmi (2,200 km; 1,370 mi) at 17 knots (31 km/h; 20 mph)
- Complement: 74 officers and sailors
- Armament: 2 x 8.8 cm (3.5 in)/30 guns; 4 x 50 cm (20 in) torpedo tubes

SMS V3 (Note: "SMS" stands for "Seiner Majestät Schiff" (German: His Majesty's Ship)) (Note: The "V" in V3 denotes the shipyard at which she was built, in this case AG Vulcan.) was a V1-class torpedo boat of the Imperial German Navy. The ship was built by AG Vulcan, completing in 1912. She served in the First World War with the German High Seas Fleet, taking part in the Battle of the Heligoland Bight in 1914 and the Battle of Jutland in 1916. She was retained by the post-war German Navy and was stricken in 1929 and scrapped.

== Construction and design ==
In 1911, the Imperial German Navy placed orders for a flotilla of 12 torpedo boats as part of its shipbuilding programme for that year, with one half flotilla of six ordered from AG Vulcan, and six from Germaniawerft. (Note: The Imperial German Navy's practice was to split a year's orders into half-flotillas of six torpedo boats from different builders, to differing detailed design.) The 1911 torpedo boats were smaller than those ordered in recent years in order to be more manoeuvrable and so work better with the fleet, which resulted in the numbering series for torpedo boats being restarted. The reduction in size resulted in the ships' seaworthiness being adversely affected, with the 1911 torpedo boats and the similar craft of the 1912 programme acquiring the disparaging nickname "Admiral Lans' cripples".

V3, yard number 319, was launched from Vulcan's Stettin, Prussia (now Szczecin in Poland) shipyard on 14 October 1911 and commissioned on 12 January 1912.

The ship was 71.1 metres (233 ft 3 in) long overall and 70.2 metres (230 ft 4 in) at the waterline, with a beam of 7.6 metres (24 ft 11 in) and a draught of 3.11 metres (10 ft 2 in). Displacement was 569 tonnes (560 long tons) normal and 697 tonnes (686 long tons) deep load. Three coal-fired and one oil-fired water-tube boilers fed steam to two direct-drive steam turbines rated at 17,000 metric horsepower (17,000 shp; 13,000 kW), giving a design speed of 32 knots (59 km/h; 37 mph). 107 tonnes (105 long tons) of coal and 78 tonnes (77 long tons) of oil were carried, giving a range of 1,190 nautical miles (2,200 km; 1,370 mi) at 17 knots (31 km/h; 20 mph) or 490 nautical miles (910 km; 560 mi) at 29 knots (54 km/h; 33 mph).

Armament consisted of two 8.8 cm (3.5 in) SK L/30 naval guns (Note: In Imperial German Navy gun nomenclature, the L/30 denotes the length of the gun. In this case, the L/30 gun is 30 caliber, meaning that the gun is 30 times as long as it is in diameter.) in single mounts fore and aft, together with four 50 cm (19.7 in) torpedo tubes with one reload torpedo carried. Up to 18 mines could be carried. In 1916 the L/30 guns were replaced by more powerful 8.8 cm (3.5 in) SK L/45 guns. In 1921 she was rearmed with two 10.5 cm SK L/45 naval guns and two 50 cm torpedo tubes, and was fitted with new boilers. The ship had a crew of 74 officers and other ranks.

== Service ==
V3 ran aground in 1911, but was successfully refloated. In May 1913 V3 was a member of the 9th Half-Flotilla, 5th Torpedo Boat Flotilla, and remained part of the 9th Half-Flotilla in May 1914.

=== First World War ===
On 28 August 1914, a British force of destroyers and cruisers supported by battlecruisers made a sortie into the Heligoland Bight in order to ambush German torpedo boats on patrol, which caused the Battle of Heligoland Bight. The 5th Torpedo Boat Flotilla, including V3, were sent out from Heligoland to investigate sightings of British submarines (which were deployed as bait to draw out German ships), and ran into several British destroyers. The Flotilla then turned away to try and escape the trap, but the torpedo boat V1, which along with S13 could not make full speed and lagged behind the rest of the flotilla, was hit by British shells before the arrival of the German cruiser Stettin allowed the 5th Flotilla to escape. In total, however, three German light cruisers (Ariadne, Cöln and Mainz) and one torpedo boat of the German outer screen (V187) had been sunk.

On 8 September 1915, the 5th and 9th Torpedo Boat Flotillas were on patrol north west of the Horns Reef when the torpedo boat G12, the leader of the 5th Flotilla, suffered a steering failure and rammed V1. Two of V1's torpedoes exploded, wrecking V1's bow and sinking G12, killing 35 of V1's crew and 47 of G12's. V3, assisted by V6 and G10, took the heavily damaged V1 under tow back to Wilhelmshaven.

At the Battle of Jutland on 31 May–1 June 1916, V3 was part of the 9th Half-Flotilla, 5th Torpedo Boat Flotilla, operating in support of the main German battle fleet. From about 20:15 CET (19:15 GMT), the German torpedo boat flotillas launched a series of torpedo attacks against the British battle line in order to cover the German fleet's turn away from the British. First to attack were the 6th and 9th Flotillas, followed by the 3rd Flotilla. At 20:38, the 5th Flotilla started an attack run, but it was unable to find the British battle-line due to poor visibility caused by fog and smoke, and the attack was aborted. During the night action, the 5th Flotilla was ordered to search for and attack the British fleet, but failed to encounter the British battleships. V3, together with V1 and G11 was fired on by a German cruiser during the night, but escaped unharmed. In the morning of 1 June, when the German battleship Ostfriesland stuck a mine, V3, along with V5 and G11, screened the damaged Ostfriesland as she returned to port. V3 was undamaged.

=== Postwar operations ===
V3 survived the war, and was one of the twelve destroyers that the Reichsmarine was allowed to retain under the Treaty of Versailles. (Note: Although treated as destroyers under the treaty, V3 and other ships of her class were always referred to as torpedo boats by the Germans.) In early 1923 she was serving in the North Sea. By 1929, the Reichsmarine had taken delivery of twelve Type 24 and Type 25 torpedo boats, and therefore disposed of the least useful of its old torpedo boats in order to keep within Treaty limits. She was stricken on 27 March 1929 and was broken up at Wilhelmshaven.

== Bibliography ==
- Campbell, John (1998). Jutland: An Analysis of the Fighting. London: Conway Maritime Press. ISBN 0-85177-750-3.
- Dodson, Aidan (2019). "Beyond the Kaiser: The IGN's Destroyers and Torpedo Boats After 1918". In Jordan, John (ed.). Warship 2019. Oxford, UK: Osprey Publishing. pp. 129–144. ISBN 978-1-4728-3595-6.
- Gardiner, Robert; Chesneau, Roger, eds. (1980). Conway's All The World's Fighting Ships 1922–1946. London: Conway Maritime Press. ISBN 0-85177-146-7.
- Gardiner, Robert; Gray, Randal, eds. (1985). Conway's All The World's Fighting Ships 1906–1921. London: Conway Maritime Press. ISBN 0-85177-245-5.
- Gröner, Erich (1983). Die deutschen Kriegsschiffe 1815–1945: Band 2: Torpedoboote, Zerstörer, Schnelleboote, Minensuchboote, Minenräumboote (in German). Koblenz, Germany: Bernard & Graefe Verlag. ISBN 3-7637-4801-6.
- Groos, O. (1924). Der Krieg in der Nordsee: Vierter Band: Von Unfang Februar bis Dezember 1915. Der Krieg zur See: 1914–1918. Berlin: Verlag von E. S. Mittler und Sohn – via National Library of Estonia.
- Massie, Robert K. (2007). Castles of Steel: Britain, Germany and the Winning of the Great War at Sea. London: Vintage Books. ISBN 978-0-099-52378-9.
- Monograph No. 11: Heligoland Bight—The Action of August 28, 1914 (PDF). Naval Staff Monographs (Historical). Vol. III. The Naval Staff, Training and Staff Duties Division. 1921. pp. 110–166. OCLC 220734221.
- Rangeliste der Kaiserlisch-Deutschen Marine für das Jahr 1913 (in German). Berlin: Ernst Siegfried Mittler und Sohn. 1913.
- Rangeliste der Kaiserlisch-Deutschen Marine für das Jahr 1914 (in German). Berlin: Ernst Siegfried Mittler und Sohn. 1914.
