= Wilhelm von Krosigk =

German Naval commander (1871–1953)

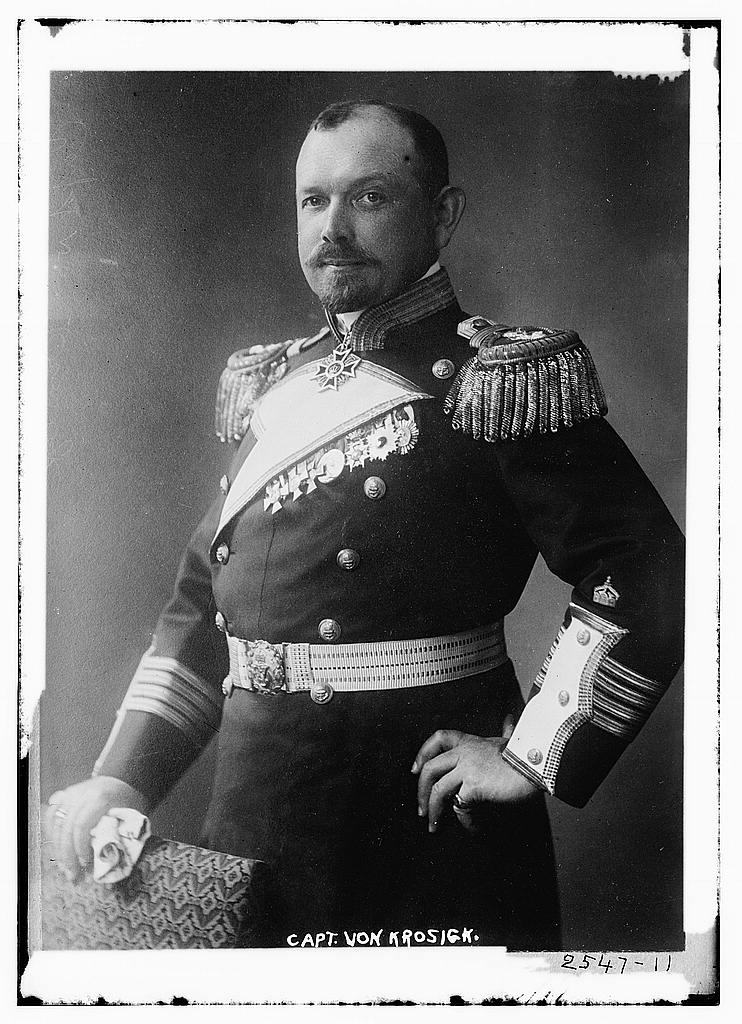

Wilhelm von Krosigk (20 November 1871 – 12 August 1953), was the German commander of the SMS Stettin during a visit to the United States in 1912. He commanded the ship from October 1911 to October 1913.

He was born in 1871 in Ballenstedt, in the Duchy of Anhalt, in the German Empire. He died in 1953 in Germany.
