= SMS Stettin =

Light cruiser of the German Imperial Navy

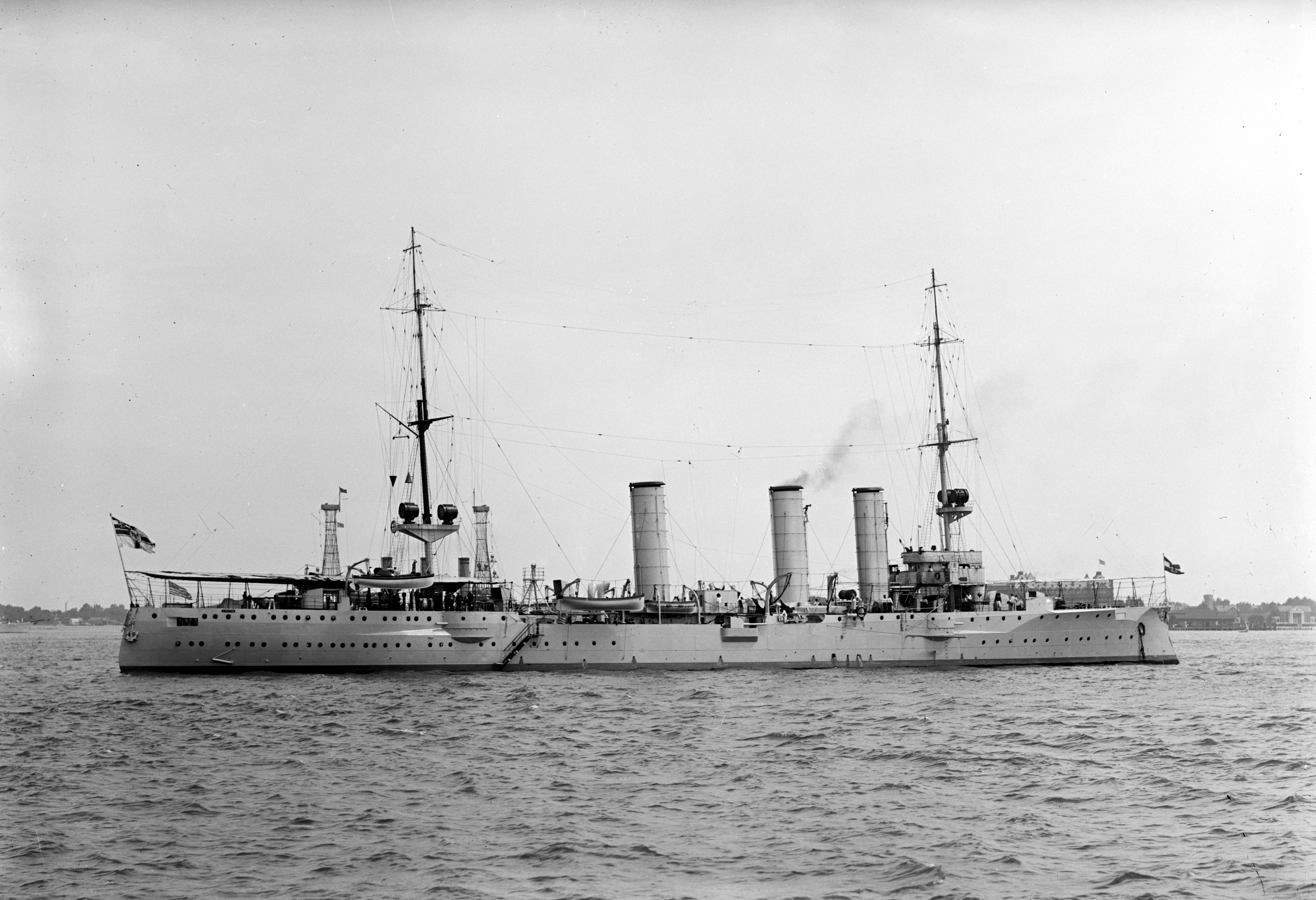
- SMS Stettin in 1912

History

German Empire
- Name: Stettin
- Namesake: Stettin
- Builder: AG Vulcan, Stettin
- Laid down: 1906
- Launched: 7 March 1907
- Commissioned: 29 October 1907
- Stricken: 5 November 1919
- Fate: Ceded to Britain 1920, scrapped in 1921–1923

General characteristics
- Class & type: Königsberg-class cruiser
- Displacement: Normal: 3,480 t (3,430 long tons); Full load: 3,822 t (3,762 long tons)
- Length: 115.3 m (378 ft)
- Beam: 13.2 m (43 ft)
- Draft: 5.29 m (17.4 ft)
- Installed power: 13,500 PS (9,900 kW); 11 × water-tube boilers
- Propulsion: 2 × screw propellers; 2 × steam turbines
- Speed: 24 knots (44.4 km/h; 27.6 mph)
- Range: 5,750 nautical miles (10,650 km; 6,620 mi) at 12 knots (22 km/h; 14 mph)
- Complement: 14 officers; 308 enlisted men
- Armament: 10 × 10.5 cm (4.1 in) SK L/40 guns; 8 × 5.2 cm (2 in) SK guns; 2 × 45 cm (17.7 in) torpedo tubes
- Armor: Deck: 80 mm (3.1 in); Conning tower: 100 mm (3.9 in)

SMS Stettin ("His Majesty's Ship Stettin") (Note: "SMS" stands for "Seiner Majestät Schiff", or "His Majesty's Ship".) was a Königsberg-class light cruiser of the Kaiserliche Marine (Imperial Navy). She had three sister ships: Königsberg, Nürnberg, and Stuttgart. Laid down at AG Vulcan Stettin shipyard in 1906, Stettin was launched in March 1907 and commissioned into the High Seas Fleet seven months later in October. Like her sisters, Stettin was armed with a main battery of ten 10.5 cm (4.1 in) guns and a pair of 45 cm (18 in) torpedo tubes, and was capable of a top speed in excess of 25 knots (46 km/h; 29 mph).

In 1912, Stettin joined the battlecruiser Moltke and cruiser Bremen for a goodwill visit to the United States. After the outbreak of World War I, Stettin served in the reconnaissance forces of the German fleet. She saw heavy service for the first three years of the war, including at the Battle of Heligoland Bight in August 1914 and the Battle of Jutland in May – June 1916, along with other smaller operations in the North and Baltic Seas. In 1917, she was withdrawn from frontline service and used as a training ship until the end of the war. In the aftermath of Germany's defeat, Stettin was surrendered to the Allies and broke up for scrap in 1921–1923.

== Design ==
The Königsberg-class ships were designed to serve both as fleet scouts in home waters and in Germany's colonial empire. This was a result of budgetary constraints that prevented the Kaiserliche Marine (Imperial Navy) from building more specialized cruisers suitable for both roles. The Königsberg class was an iterative development of the preceding Bremen class. All four members of the class were intended to be identical, but after the initial vessel was begun, the design staff incorporated lessons from the Russo-Japanese War. These included internal rearrangements and a lengthening of the hull. Stettin was fitted with steam turbines on an experimental basis; she was the second cruiser of the German fleet so equipped.

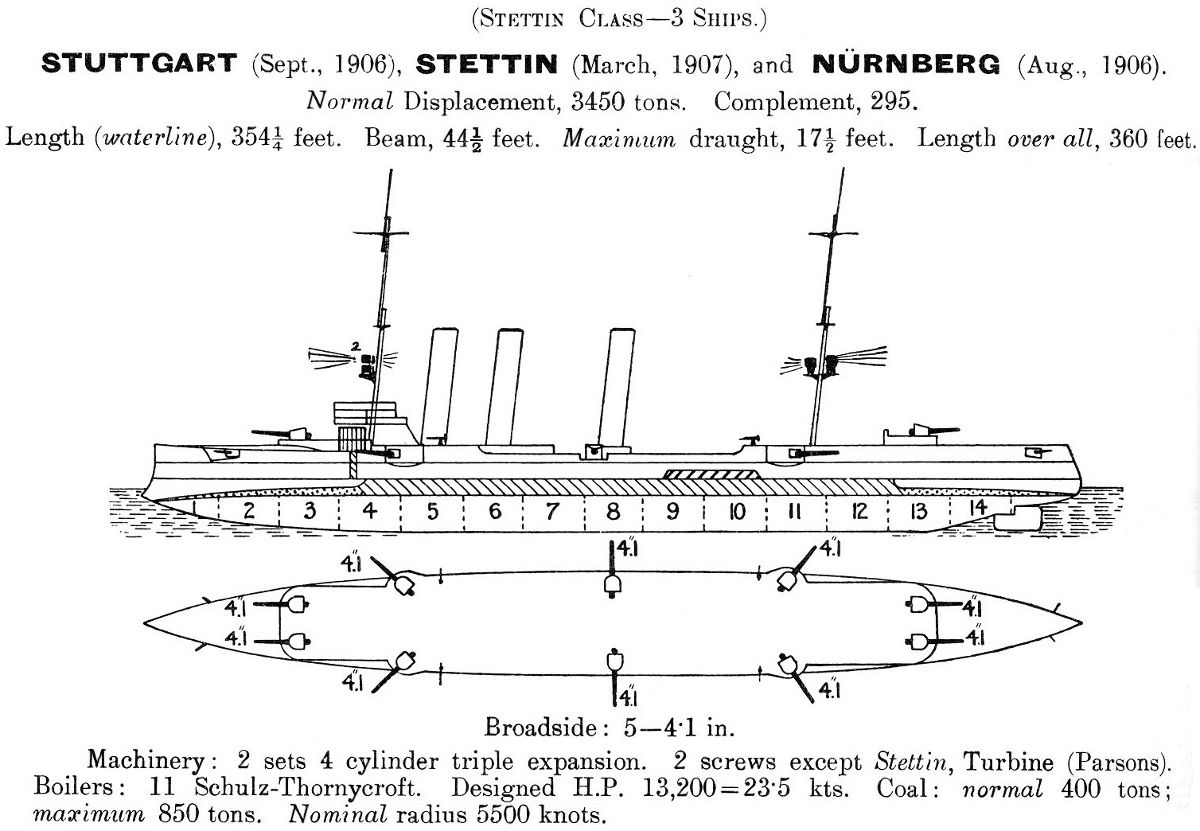
Plan and profile drawing of the Königsberg class (Note: The diagram mistakenly refers to the class as the Stettin class and does not include Königsberg)

Stettin was 115.3 meters (378 ft) long overall and had a beam of 13.2 m (43 ft) and a draft of 5.29 m (17.4 ft) forward. She displaced 3,480 t (3,430 long tons; 3,840 short tons) normally and up to 3,822 t (3,762 long tons; 4,213 short tons) at full load. The ship had a minimal superstructure, which consisted of a small conning tower and bridge structure. Her hull had a raised forecastle and quarterdeck, along with a pronounced ram bow. She was fitted with two pole masts. Stettin had a crew of 14 officers and 308 enlisted men.

Her propulsion system consisted of a pair of Parsons steam turbines that drove a pair of screw propellers. Steam was provided by eleven coal-fired Marine-type water-tube boilers that were vented through three funnels. The ship's propulsion system was rated to produce 13,500 metric horsepower (9,900 kW) for a top speed of 23 knots (43 km/h; 26 mph), though she exceeded these figures in service. Normal coal storage amounted to 400 t (390 long tons; 440 short tons). At a more economical pace of 12 knots (22 km/h; 14 mph), the ship had a range of approximately 5,750 nautical miles (10,650 km; 6,620 mi).

The ship was armed with a main battery of ten 10.5 cm (4.1 in) SK L/40 guns in single pedestal mounts. Two were placed side-by-side forward on the forecastle; six were located on the broadside, three on either side; and two were side by side aft. The guns had a maximum elevation of 30 degrees, which allowed them to engage targets out to 12,700 m (41,700 ft). They were supplied with 1,500 rounds of ammunition, amounting to 150 shells per gun. The ship was also equipped with eight 5.2 cm (2 in) SK guns with 4,000 rounds of ammunition. She was also equipped with a pair of 45 cm (17.7 in) torpedo tubes with five torpedoes submerged in the hull on the broadside.

The ship was protected by a curved armor deck that was 80 mm (3.1 in) thick amidships. The deck sloped downward at the sides, with a thickness of 45 mm (1.8 in), to provide protection against enemy fire. The conning tower sides were 100 mm (3.9 in) thick. Her main battery guns were fitted with 50 mm (2 in) thick gun shields.

== Service history ==
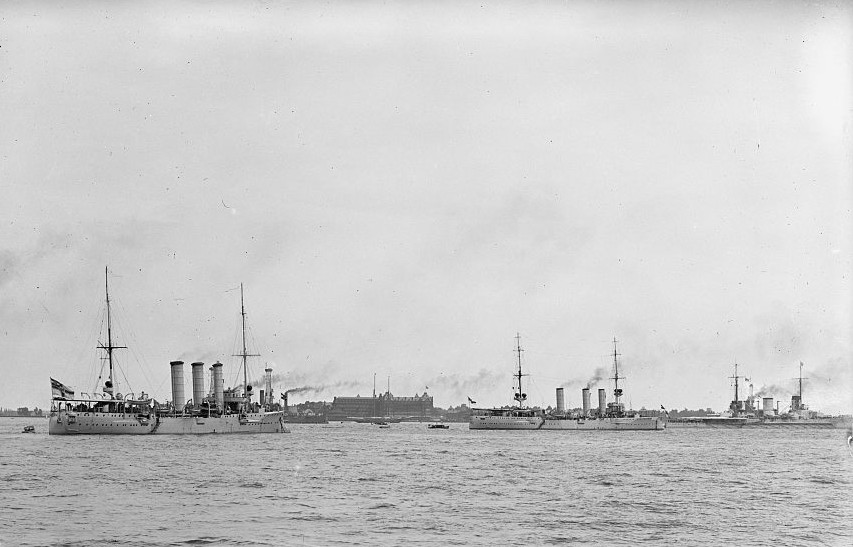
Stettin (center), with Bremen (L) and Moltke (R) in Hampton Roads

Stettin was ordered under the contract name "Ersatz Wacht" (Note: German warships were ordered under provisional names. Additions to the fleet were given a single letter; ships intended to replace older or lost vessels were ordered as "Ersatz (name of the ship to be replaced)".) on 20 December 1905. She was laid down at the AG Vulcan shipyard in her namesake city on 22 March 1906. She was launched on 7 March 1907, and the mayor of Stettin gave a speech at the launching ceremony. Fitting-out work thereafter commenced, which was completed by September 1907. Because of her experimental turbines, the German Navy examined the ship thoroughly before accepting her. She was commissioned into active service on 29 October to begin sea trials. Following her initial testing, she was assigned to the Scouting Unit on 20 January 1908, replacing the cruiser Frauenlob. At that time Fregattenkapitän (FK—Frigate Captain) Friedrich Boedicker took command of the ship. In February, she and the rest of the scouting unit visited Vigo, Spain, during a cruise with the High Seas Fleet. Stettin's normal peacetime routine of training exercises was interrupted from 17 June to 8 August, when she was ordered to escort Hohenzollern, the yacht of Kaiser Wilhelm II. During this period, the ships sailed to Stockholm, Sweden, where the Swedish king, Gustav V visited Stettin. Later in August, Boedicker was replaced by FK Curt von Rössing.

In early 1909, civil unrest broke out in the Ottoman Empire against Christians living in the country. At the time, Hohenzollern was cruising in the Mediterranean Sea with the cruiser Hamburg as the escort. Hamburg was detached to intervene in southern Anatolia in the Ottoman Empire, and Stettin was sent to replace her as the escort for Hohenzollern. On 9 April, she departed Kiel in company with the light cruiser Lübeck, which was to support Hamburg in operations off the coast of Anatolia. The ships arrived in Corfu, an island off Greece, on 1 May. While the ships were in Pola, Austria-Hungary, on 15 May, Stettin received orders to return to Germany. She reached Kiel on 26 May. In October, FK Wilhelm Höpfner relieved Rössing as the ship's captain. Stettin once again served as the escort for Hohenzollern in 1910, from 7 to 30 July. This year, the ships cruised in Scandinavian waters. The ship's commander rotated again in September, with FK Johannes Hartog taking command. The year 1911 passed uneventfully for Stettin, beyond the normal peacetime routine of training exercises and fleet maneuvers. In October, FK Wilhelm von Krosigk became the ship's next captain.

In March 1912, Stettin was assigned to the East American Cruiser Division, which also included the battlecruiser Moltke and the light cruiser Bremen, and was commanded by Konteradmiral (KAdm—Rear Admiral) Hubert von Rebeur-Paschwitz. The ships were sent to make a goodwill cruise to the United States; Moltke was the only German capital ship to ever visit the US. On 11 May 1912 the ships left Kiel and arrived off Hampton Roads, Virginia, on 30 May. There, they met the US Atlantic Fleet and were greeted by then-President William Howard Taft aboard the presidential yacht USS Mayflower. After touring the East Coast for two weeks, they returned to Germany. On the way back, they stopped in Vigo from 22 to 26 June, before continuing on to Kiel, arriving there three days later. Stettin thereafter returned to the reconnaissance unit.

In July 1913, Stettin was sent to Pillau for a ceremony for the dedication of a monument for Frederick William, the Great Elector. Later that year, she was involved in a minor collision with the steam ship SS Cassandra, and Stettin had one of her spotting tops torn off a mast. The ship took part in her last peacetime training exercise with the High Seas Fleet in November 1913. She was thereafter replaced in the reconnaissance unit by the new cruiser Rostock, and on 4 February 1914, Stettin had her crew reduced. On 1 July, the ship was reactivated and received a full crew; she was now to join the U-boat force as a submarine flotilla flagship. Stettin became the flagship of II U-boat Flotilla. At that time, Korvettenkapitän (Corvette Captain) Karl August Nerger took command of the ship; he served aboard the ship until March 1916. By that time, Archduke Franz Ferdinand of Austria-Hungary had been assassinated, which sparked the July Crisis and led to the outbreak of World War I in late July, starting with the Austro-Hungarian declaration of war on Serbia on the 28th.

=== Actions in the North Sea ===
Stettin continued in her role as a U-boat flotilla flagship after the start of hostilities. On 6 August, she and the cruiser Hamburg escorted a flotilla of U-boats into the North Sea in an attempt to draw out the British fleet, which could then be attacked by the U-boats. The force sailed about 100 nautical miles (190 km; 120 mi) to the northwest of Helgoland and then returned to port without having encountered any British warships. They made a second sweep into the North Sea on 8 August, again without successfully locating any British ships.

==== Battle of Helgoland Bight ====
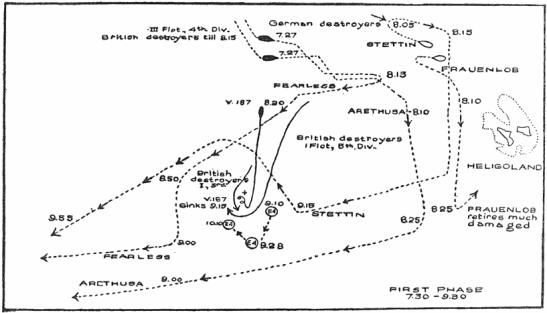
Map showing the first phase of the battle, including Stettin's actions against the destroyers

Some two weeks later, on 28 August, Stettin was involved in the Battle of Helgoland Bight. At the start of the engagement, Stettin, Frauenlob, and Hela stood in support of the line of torpedo boats patrolling the Helgoland Bight; Stettin was at anchor to the northeast of Helgoland, and the other two ships were on either side. The German screen was under the command of Rear Admiral Franz von Hipper, the commander of reconnaissance forces for the High Seas Fleet. When the British first attacked the German torpedo boats, Hipper immediately dispatched Stettin and Frauenlob, and several other cruisers that were in distant support, to come to their aid. At 08:32, Stettin received the report of German torpedo boats in contact with the British, and immediately weighed anchor and steamed off to support them. Twenty-six minutes later, she encountered the British destroyers and opened fire, at a range of 8.5 km (5.3 mi). The attack forced the British ships to break off and turn back west. During the engagement, lookouts aboard Stettin spotted a British cruiser in the distance, but it did not join the battle. By 9:10, the British had withdrawn out of range, and Stettin fell back to get steam in all of her boilers. During this portion of the battle, the ship was hit once, on the starboard No. 4 gun, which killed two men and badly injured another. Her intervention prevented the British from sinking the torpedo boats V1 and S13.

By 10:00, Stettin had steam in all of her boilers, and was capable of her top speed. She therefore returned to the battle, and at 10:06, she encountered eight British destroyers and immediately attacked them, opening fire at 10:08. Several hits were observed in the British formation, which dispersed and fled. By 10:13, the visibility had decreased, and Stettin could no longer see the fleeing destroyers, and so broke off the chase. The ship had been hit several times in return, without causing significant damage, but killing another two and wounding another four men. At around 13:40, Stettin reached with the cruiser Ariadne, which was just coming under attack from several British battlecruisers. Stettin's crew could see the large muzzle flashes in the haze, which after having disabled Ariadne, turned on Stettin at 14:05. The haze saved the ship, which was able to escape after ten salvos missed her. At 14:20, she encountered Danzig. The German battlecruisers Von der Tann and Moltke reached the scene by 15:25, by which time the British had already disengaged and withdrawn. Hipper, in Seydlitz, followed closely behind, and ordered the light cruisers to fall back on his ships. After conducting a short reconnaissance further west, the Germans returned to port, arriving in Wilhelmshaven by 21:30. In total, Stettin had two men killed and nine wounded.

==== Fleet operations ====
Stettin was removed from her role as flotilla flagship on 25 November, and two days later, she was assigned to IV Scouting Group, part of the reconnaissance screen for the battleships of the High Seas Fleet. She became the group flagship, under the command of Kommodore (Commodore) Karl von Restorff. At that time, Restorff was also the commander of II Torpedo-boat Flotilla. In this new role, Stettin became involved in the raids on the British coast that were carried out by the battlecruisers of I Scouting Group. The first that involved Stettin began on 15 December, when I Scouting Group, led by Hipper, conducted a bombardment of Scarborough, Hartlepool, and Whitby on the English coast. The main body of the High Seas Fleet, commanded by Admiral Friedrich von Ingenohl, stood by in distant support; Stettin and two flotillas of torpedo boats screened the rear of the formation. That evening, the German battle fleet of some twelve dreadnoughts and eight pre-dreadnoughts came to within 10 nmi (19 km; 12 mi) of an isolated squadron of six British battleships. However, skirmishes between the rival screens in the darkness convinced Ingenohl that he was faced with the entire Grand Fleet. Under orders from Kaiser Wilhelm II to avoid risking the fleet unnecessarily, Ingenohl broke off the engagement and turned the battle fleet back toward Germany.

On 26 January 1915, Restorff's commands were divided; he retained control over II Torpedo-boat Flotilla and shifted his flag to the cruiser Kolberg, while KzS Georg Scheidt replaced him as commander of IV Scouting Group. Scheidt, who was promoted to konteradmiral on 23 February, kept Stettin as the group flagship. At that time, the unit consisted of Stettin and the cruisers Stuttgart, Danzig, Berlin, München, and Frauenlob. Stettin next went to sea for a fleet operation on 29 March, though IV Scouting Group was missing Danzig and Stettin; they were instead reinforced with Hamburg. The operation concluded the following day, and failed to locate British vessels. On 11 April, Stettin, München, and Frauenlob sortied to cover a patrol by the 2nd and 13th Torpedo-Half-Flotillas to the area south of Horns Rev to inspect fishing boats in the area. Two further fleet operations into the North Sea followed on 17–18 and 21–22 April, again without resulting in action with British forces.

=== Operations in the Baltic ===
On 4 May 1915, IV Scouting Group, which by then consisted of Stettin, Stuttgart, München, and Danzig, and twenty-one torpedo boats was sent into the Baltic Sea to support a major operation against Russian positions at Libau. The operation was commanded by Rear Admiral Hopman, the commander of the reconnaissance forces in the Baltic. IV Scouting Group was tasked with screening to the north to prevent any Russian naval forces from moving out of the Gulf of Finland undetected, while several armored cruisers and other warships bombarded the port. The ships of IV Scouting Group were ordered to patrol the line between Huvudskär, Gotska Sandön, and Ösel.

The Russians did attempt to intervene with a force of four cruisers: Admiral Makarov, Bayan, Oleg, and Bogatyr. The Russian ships briefly engaged München, and Scheidt recalled his other cruisers to join Stettin to come to München's aid. The Russian forces were significantly stronger than the German light cruisers, but they believed more powerful German forces would intervene, and so they disengaged; indeed, when reports of the action arrived at German headquarters, the pre-dreadnought battleships of IV Battle Squadron were detached to reinforce Scheidt's cruisers. Shortly after the bombardment, Libau was captured by the advancing German army, and Stettin and the rest of IV Scouting Group were recalled to the High Seas Fleet, arriving back in the North Sea on 12 May.

=== Return to the North Sea ===
Soon after arriving back with the High Seas Fleet, Stettin and the rest of IV Scouting Group sortied for another sweep into the North Sea on 17–18 May. Another attempt to catch British vessels in the southern North Sea took place on 29–30 May. Neither operation located hostile ships. The pace of operations slowed somewhat, and on 2 July, Stettin again served in the covering force for a torpedo-boat patrol among the fishing ships south of Horns Rev. On 10 August, the fleet went to sea again, this time to cover the return of the auxiliary cruiser Meteor, which was returning from a commerce raiding cruise. Kommodore Ludwig von Reuter replaced Scheidt as the group commander on 3 September. Stettin covered a minelaying operation off the Swarte Bank on 11–12 September. The final fleet operation of the war took place on 23–24 October in the direction of Horns Rev; like its predecessors, the ships did not encounter British vessels.

The German fleet saw little activity over the winter of 1915–1916. The first major operation carried out by Stettin and the rest of IV Scouting Group took place on 4 March, and it was a patrol to cover the return of the commerce raider Möwe. The following day, the ships joined the main body of the High Seas Fleet for a sweep into the Hoofden that concluded on 7 March, again without result. Stettin was dry docked for periodic maintenance from 8 to 25 March. Reuter temporarily left the ship on 28 March, as he was briefly transferred to command II Scouting Group. Kommodore Paul Heinrich, the commander of II Torpedo-boat Flotilla, was given command of IV Scouting Group in Reuter's absence, which lasted until 13 May, when Reuter returned to Stettin. By this time, the unit consisted of Stettin, Stettin, Frauenlob, and München; in addition, Hamburg, which was the flagship of the fleet's torpedo boat flotillas, was tactically assigned to IV Scouting Group. While Heinrich flew his flag aboard Stettin, the ships took part in another fleet operation that resulted in the bombardment of Yarmouth and Lowestoft by the battlecruisers of I Scouting Group on 24–25 April.

==== Battle of Jutland ====
Maps showing the maneuvers of the British (blue) and German (red) fleets on 30–31 May 1916

In May 1916, the German fleet commander, Admiral Reinhard Scheer, planned a major operation to cut off and destroy an isolated squadron of the British fleet. The operation resulted in the battle of Jutland on 31 May – 1 June 1916. IV Scouting Group was tasked with screening for the main German battlefleet. As the German fleet approached the scene of the unfolding engagement between the British and German battlecruiser squadrons, Stettin steamed ahead of the leading German battleship, König, with the rest of the Group dispersed to screen for submarines. Stettin and IV Scouting Group were not heavily engaged during the early phases of the battle, since they were stationed close to the main body of the fleet and their guns could not hit targets at the long ranges at which the battle was primarily fought; through the daylight portion of the battle, they only managed to fire a few salvoes intermittently as British ships briefly came into range. But around 21:30, they encountered the British cruiser HMS Falmouth. Stettin and München briefly fired on the British ship, but poor visibility forced the ships to cease fire. Reuter turned his ships 90 degrees away and disappeared in the haze.

During the withdrawal from the battle on the night of 31 May at around 23:30, the battlecruisers Moltke and Seydlitz passed ahead of Stettin too closely, forcing her to slow down. The rest of IV Scouting Group did not notice the reduction in speed, and so the ships became disorganized. Shortly thereafter, the British 2nd Light Cruiser Squadron came upon the German cruisers, which were joined by Hamburg, Elbing, and Rostock. A ferocious firefight at very close range ensued; Stettin was hit twice early in the engagement and was set on fire. One of these hits knocked out one of her port 10.5 cm guns. A shell fragment punctured the steam pipe for the ship's siren, and the escaping steam impaired visibility and forced the ship to abandon an attempt to launch torpedoes. In the melee, HMS Southampton was hit by approximately eighteen 10.5 cm shells, including some from Stettin. German observers aboard Stettin reported seeing fires aboard the British cruiser. In the meantime, Frauenlob was set on fire and sunk; as the German cruisers turned to avoid colliding with the sinking wreck, IV Scouting Group became dispersed. Only München remained with Stettin. The two ships accidentally attacked the German destroyers G11, V1, and V3 at 23:55.

By 04:00 on 1 June, the German fleet had evaded the British fleet and reached Horns Reef; the Germans then returned to port. In the course of the battle, Stettin had suffered eight men killed and another 28 wounded. She had fired a total of 81 rounds of ammunition from her 10.5 cm guns.

=== Subsequent operations ===
After the battle, Stettin was docked at the Reiherstieg Schiffswerfte & Maschinenfabrik shipyard in Hamburg for repairs that lasted from 7 to 22 June. She was then moved to the Kaiserliche Werft (Imperial Shipyard) in Wilhelmshaven for additional work from 6 to 19 July. By the time repairs to the ships of IV Scouting Group were completed in July, the unit consisted of Stettin, Stuttgart, Danzig, Hamburg, München, and Berlin. From 18 to 20 August, the ships participated in a fleet operation into the southern North Sea, which resulted in the action of 19 August. Reuter was transferred back to II Scouting Group on 11 September, and he was replaced by Kommodore Karl Seiferling. Another fleet sortie took place on 18–20 October, as far as east of the Dogger Bank. During the operation, München was torpedoed by a British submarine and had to be towed back to port by Berlin. Stettin evaded one torpedo but another hit the ship. The warhead failed to detonate, but the impact nevertheless dented the hull and tore some of the plating. On 3 December, Stettin was replaced as the group flagship by the cruiser Stralsund.

Stettin took part in a minelaying operation on 10 January 1917, which laid a defensive mine barrier between Helgoland and Norderney. For the rest of the year, the German fleet remained largely in port, and the cruisers of IV Scouting Group were largely confined to defensive patrols in the German Bight to protect the U-boat force as it departed from and returned to its bases in Germany. On 4 July, Stettin went to the Baltic for training exercises; she was also used as a target ship during shooting practice. This period lasted until 10 November. She was detached from IV Scouting Group in August, and on 10 September, she became the flagship of the Commander of the Defenses of the Western Baltic Sea, KAdm Hermann Nordmann. She replaced the pre-dreadnought Deutschland in that role. Stettin departed for periodic maintenance in Wilhelmshaven on 8 December. By the time she returned to the Baltic on 17 February 1918, Nordmann's command had been merged with its counterpart for the central Baltic, and he became the Commander of the Defence of the Baltic, though he shifted his flag from Stettin to Kolberg.

At that time, Stettin was withdrawn from front line service and used as a training ship with the U-boat school. She was employed as a target ship for U-boat crews to practice torpedoing a moving target. There was some debate about converting the ship into a seaplane tender, as had been done to her sister ship Stuttgart earlier that year, but the discussion came to nothing. Instead, she served briefly as the flagship for the Commander of Minesweeping and Clearing Force from 10 June to 20 July, at which point she was replaced by the cruiser Augsburg. Stettin thereafter returned to the U-boat school, where she remained until the end of the war in November. During this period, on 25 September, Kaiser Wilhelm II visited the ship.

On 11 November, the Armistice with Germany went into effect, ending the fighting in World War I. Following Germany's defeat, Stettin was decommissioned in Wilhelmshaven on 19 or 20 December in Kiel. (Note: Records in the German Federal Archives give conflicting dates.) She was specified among the list of vessels to be surrendered to the Allied powers as a war prize under the terms of the Treaty of Versailles. She was accordingly stricken from the naval register on 5 November 1919. She left Germany in company with the cruiser Danzig and thirteen torpedo boats between 9 and 11 September 1920 and arrived in Rosyth, Great Britain, on 17 September, where Stettin was surrendered to Great Britain under the transfer name "T". The terms of the Versailles treaty required that ex-German warships be dismantled or rendered unusable by specific dates; as the deadline for Stettin (16 March 1922) rapidly approached, she was sold to shipbreakers in Copenhagen and dismantled for scrap by 1923.
