= Ursula Mayer =

Austrian artist

Ursula Mayer (born 1970) is an Austrian multimedia artist living in London. Her practice spans a variety of media, including: film, video, and sculpture.

== Biography ==
She was born in Ried im Innkreis. Mayer was educated at the Academy of Fine Arts Vienna and at the Royal College of Art in London and received a MFA from Goldsmiths College.

=== Career ===
Mayer has had solo exhibitions at the Whitechapel Gallery and the Institute of Contemporary Arts in London, at the Museum of Modern Art in Linz and at the Centraal Museum in Utrecht. She has also been included in exhibitions at the Kunsthalle Basel, at the RCM Art Museum in Nanjing, the Venice Biennale, the Berlin Biennale and Vienna International Apartment.

Some of Mayer's films deal with gender issues: her films Gonda and Cinesexual feature Valentijn de Hingh, a transgender model. Her films 33 Portland Place, Keeling House and Villa Mairea explore the relationship between human identity and architecture.

In 2007, she received the Otto Mauer Prize. She was awarded the Derek Jarman award in 2014.
