= Richard Stumpf =

Richard Stumpf (20 February 1892 (according to another source, 21 February 1892) – 23 July 1958) was Roman Catholic, a tinsmith and a member of a Christian trade union. From 1912 to 1918 he served in the High Seas Fleet of the German Imperial Navy. From just before the start of the First World War to its end, he wrote a personal war diary. Because the diary comprehensively represented the internal situation in the fleet from the perspective of a regular sailor, it has been documented in full length by the enquiry commission of the German Weimar Republic parliament (Reichstag) in its investigation report.

== Education, service in the Imperial Navy, memberships and war diary ==
Stumpf was born 20 February 1892 – according to another source 21 February 1892 – in Grafenberg (Bavaria, Germany) and died 23 July 1958 in Heiligenstadt (Eichsfeld, Germany). He was a catholic tinsmith and a member of a Christian trade union, and he received the basic education of a worker. However, he was well-read and interested in many things. As a journeyman he had come as far as Veneto and South Tyrol. He constantly educated himself further.

From 1912 until November 1918 he served in the German Imperial Navy. Most of that time, i.e. from shortly before the outbreak of World War I in 1914 until March 1918 he was deployed on the SMS Helgoland from the I. Squadron, in the beginning as a seaman and later as seaman first class. In a diary entry from 1916, he noted that he still hadn't managed to become a seaman first class due to always frankly stating his opinion. However, in March 1918 he mentioned that he had become a seaman first class by then; probably on the occasion of being transferred to SMS Wittelsbach.

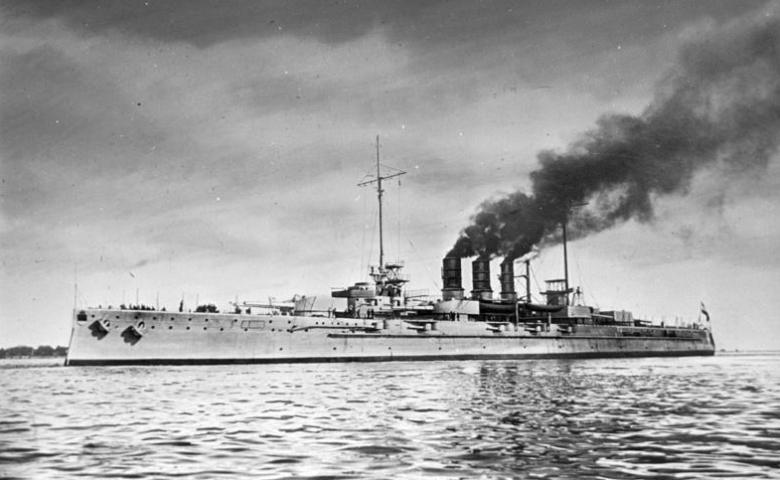
Dreadnought battleship SMS Helgoland, commissioned August 1911, crew complement: 1113 men.

Stumpf was a member of a Christian trade union and had joined the right-wing German Fatherland Party whilst still at war.

He wrote a war diary that spanned over six books, shedding light on the internal situation and especially on the relationship between officers and enlisted men. This is why the enquiry commission of the German Reichstag included the text in full length in its investigation report (though making anonymous certain names). Huck, Pieken und Rogg established an exhibition titled: "Die Flotte schläft im Hafen ein (The fleet falls asleep in the harbour)", presenting Stumpf's notes alongside another diary. In the exhibition catalogue they explain that Stumpf's six notebooks cannot be regarded as diaries in a strict sense, but that the books contain transcripts, which have been written on the basis of lost diary records. The transcripts show several corrections in another handwriting that can be attributed to an editing for the publication in 1927 (see below). Stumpf was appointed special expert for the navy activities by the enquiry commission.

== Diary content ==
Almost every day Stumpf noted down his experiences, observations and assessments in his war diary. He read several books, various newspapers and discussed the political and military developments in detail with his environment, which is reflected in corresponding thoughts and comments in his diary.

Initially Stumpf was conservative, and identified himself with the war aims of the Central Powers. He repeatedly described the general enthusiasm at the beginning of the war which was also shared by him. Soon, however, the perceived unfair treatment by the officers brought him to view the war from a different perspective. He repeatedly described that the "officer caste" would receive a high war allowance besides their already good salary, that they would live in abundance during the war, while the sailors would suffer great hardships. In addition, the officers would humiliate the crews, exert a senseless drill and would constantly invent new methods of bullying the crews.

Only during battles, such as in the Battle of Jutland, the sailors and stokers felt taken seriously and treated properly by the officers. However, there were but few of these battles, because the largely inflexible strategy of the German Navy was based on a misinterpretation of the English approach.

This catastrophic military-strategic planning, which centered on a large naval battle against England near Heligoland, found its reflection in Stumpf's diary when he noted: "We all had to realize gradually that even a victorious naval battle will not guarantee Germany access to the open sea." Arrogance accompanied by strategic inability caused Stumpf to wish that one day the officer caste could be forced to take on an honourable profession and perform a useful activity. The sailors wished to be able to pay back the officers the constant humiliations and harassments that these could perpetrate under the protection of the strict military discipline.

In Stumpf's final analysis, only the officers would have an interest in the continuation of the war, while soldiers and workers had to risk their lives and take great deprivations for the Junkers, "walking safes" and military aristocracy (he views the priests as officers in plain clothes). The fact that soldiers and workers also had a democratic voting legislation denied, caused special bitterness for Stumpf. Around mid-1917 Stumpf wrote that the sailors wanted peace as quickly as possible, and the opinion would prevail that only the officers and war profiteers want to continue the war. In another entry he wrote that it was the officer caste that had driven Germany into the war.

When in February 1917, one morning a pamphlet of the left-wing party USPD appeared on board, this caused great excitement. Stumpf wrote that this leaflet contained along with much truth, a motley mixture of silly platitudes and phrases. Many sheets seem to have been handed over to the superiors, according to Stumpf's perception.

The unrest in the German Navy in the summer of 1917 also found its reflection in Stumpf's diary. He described the events in detail and then noted: "If, in the past, someone had told me that it would be possible for people to be sentenced to jail or executed in Germany without having committed a crime, I would have looked upon him as a fool."

In some text passages, Stumpf talks of the "Jew Liebknecht" when he means the member of parliament for the SPD and the later USPD- and KPD-member Karl Liebknecht. Conservative and right-wing extremist politicians (many naval officers were ideologically close to the latter), claimed that Liebknecht was a Jew, in order to exploit anti-Semitism against the leftist movement. This claim lacked any validity. Karl Liebknecht's family came from Saxony and had a Protestant-Christian background. Karl Liebknecht was born in 1871 in Leipzig and baptized as a Protestant in St. Thomas Church. A great-uncle of the father was a Protestant pastor. On the occasion of the unrest in the Navy in summer of 1917 Stumpf sees the labour leader in a different light: "Now I gradually realize why some people fight the military and its system with such determination. Poor Karl Liebknecht! How sorry I feel for you now!"

Stumpf also addressed once the commandment of the Bible, "Thou shalt not kill" and revealed some pacifistic tendencies, but time and again he expressed clearly conservative views when he ranted about the "perfidious Albion" (England) or against France's rapacity, when he showed satisfaction that England had finally to sacrifice rivers of blood, and he wanted to combine the last forces for the defence of the fatherland. Stumpf's inner conflict is expressed among others in the following entry at the end of the diary: "... why did we have to have such criminal, conscienceless officers? It was they who deprived us of all our love for the Fatherland, our joy in our German existence, and our pride for our incomparable institutions. Even now my blood boils with anger whenever I think of the many injustices [...]."

At the end of the war Stumpf followed, albeit reluctantly, the red flag of revolution: "To the thunderous applause of the mob, the huge Imperial flag was lowered and the red flag of liberty, equality and fraternity rose up over the barracks. I could no longer resist and was swept along by the mass hysteria." But Stumpf's inner conflict was revealed again when the armistice conditions became known. He exclaims, "That's what you get for your god damn brotherhood of nations." But when the fleet had to be surrendered later, Stumpf expressed relief that these instruments of destruction disappeared from German waters.

== Testimony before the enquiry commission of the German Weimar Republic parliament (Reichstag) ==
In one of the enquiry commission's hearings Stumpf had a discussion with Adolf von Trotha, who was Chief of Staff of the German Imperial High Seas Fleet at the end of the First World War. Trotha had primarily initiated the planned fleet attack against England (operation-instruction no. 19). The advance was prepared without the knowledge and against the clearly expressed orders of the government. These intentions of the Navy command had led to the sailors' mutiny off Wilhelmshaven and the rebellion in Kiel.

Trotha tried to portray Stumpf's allegations as individual cases. Stumpf answered he still had the feeling that two different worlds were facing each other, separated by a Chinese wall. In preparation for the discussion he had interviewed Fritz Betz who also served on board the SMS Helgoland. Betz explicitly confirmed that the vast majority of naval officers in the High Seas Fleet humiliated and abused the sailors and stokers with constant harassment and offensive remarks.

== Publication of the diary ==
Stumpf wrote his diary out of personal interest so as to have a reminder of his war memories.

When in the beginning of the 1920s an intense debate about the stab-in-the-back myth began, Stumpf realized that his diary could contribute to the elucidation of the role of naval officers, and he handed it to Joseph Joos of the Centre Party (Germany), who recognized the value of the records and ensured they were read before the enquiry commission of the German Weimar Republic parliament (Reichstag).

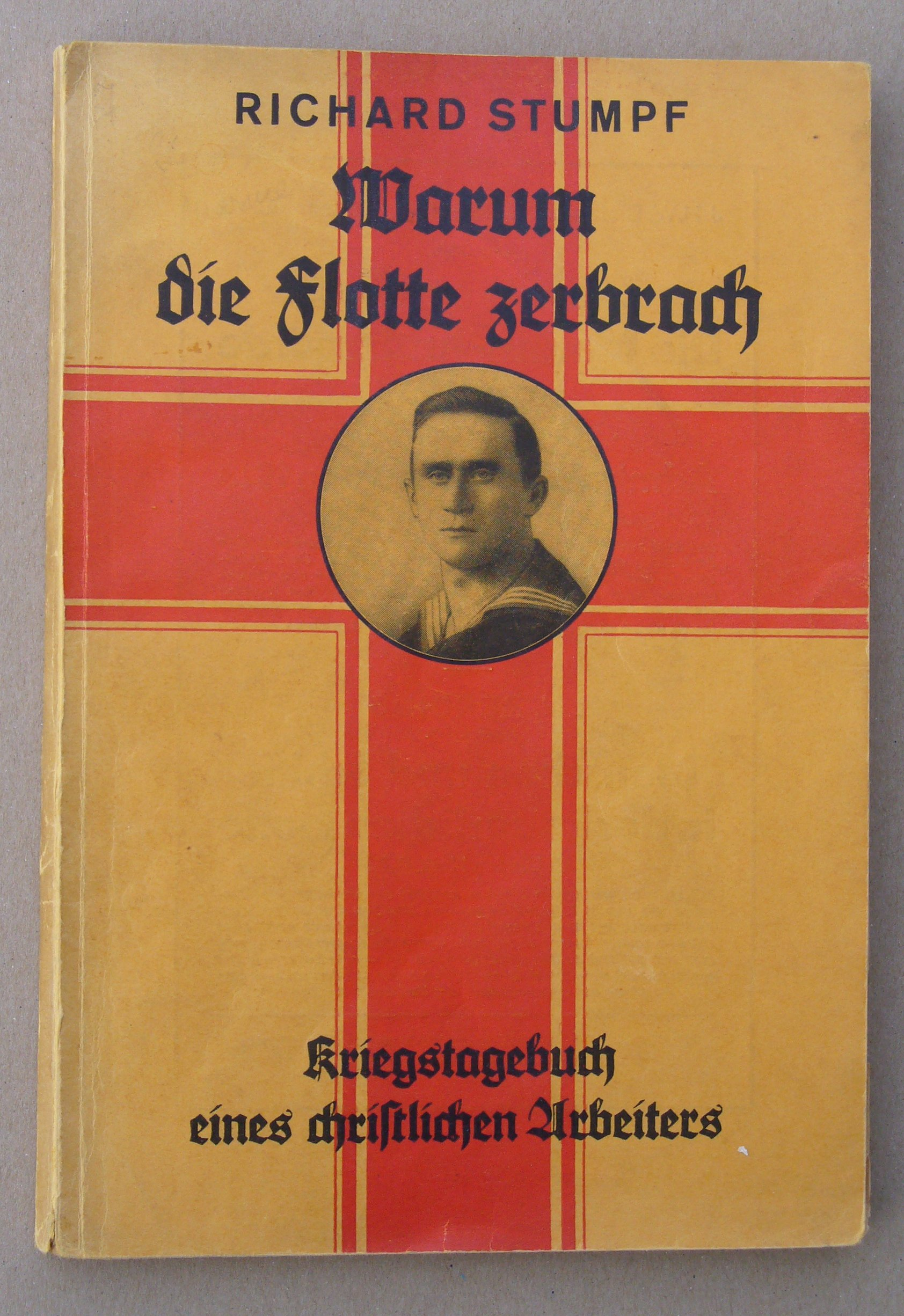
Book edition of the publisher J.H.W. Dietz Nachfolger, Berlin (Germany) 1927.

In 1927 the USPD-MP Wilhelm Dittmann published an abbreviated version under the title: "Warum die Flotte zerbrach – Kriegstagebuch eines christlichen Arbeiters (Why the fleet broke up - war diary of a Christian worker)" Dittmann added a preface, in which he stated that not any outside revolutionary influences have led to the disaster but the conditions in the fleet itself. He also added headings and a table of content.

In 1967 Daniel Horn, then assistant professor of history at Douglas College, Rutgers State University of New Brunswick in the US state of New Jersey, translated the diary into English and published it in full length. He added an introduction, many explanatory notes and an index. He restored as far as possible the anonymous names. Horn, born in Vienna (Austria), encountered the diaries in the context of his research on the unrest in the Imperial Navy and the German Revolution.

== Assessments of the diary ==
Daniel Horn evaluated the historical significance of the diary in his introduction by listing the reasons which led the enquiry commission of the German parliament to include Stumpf's diary as the only personal memory in its report: While the other persons giving testimony before the enquiry commission were officers and politicians, anxious to defend or substantiate their actions respectively their position, Stumpf was a worker, who had served as a common sailor in the Navy and his records mirrored his feelings and views at that time, without being influenced by the discussions which ensued later. Stumpf intended to keep a private diary. However, through his active and intensive involvement in the discussions of the sailors and stokers not only of the SMS Helgoland but also of many other ships as well as through his keen sense of the moods of his comrades, Stumpf expressed the general mood as well. Thus the diary constitutes an invaluable historical source of the individual but also the collective mentality of the lower ranks in the Imperial Navy.

According to Horn the diary provides a coherent explanation, not only why the conscripted sailors mutinied against their officers, but also why Germany lost the war, why the German empire collapsed and why it was overthrown by revolution. Sailors and stokers rebelled because they suffered from hunger and deprivation, because they were abused by their officers, because they wanted peace and because they were denied democratic rights. The officers tried to prolong the duration of the war lacking any sympathy with their subordinates, in order to enforce imperial aspirations and annexations. The sailors and stokers viewed the continuation of the war as being only in the interest of the officers who were not the least considerate but on the contrary deliberately harassed them.

Horn could think only of two other publications that can be compared with Stumpf's diary: firstly Joachim Ringelnatz' work "Als Mariner im Krieg (as mariner at war)", which Horn, however, views as not nearly as authentic, stirring, and poignant. Secondly Horn refers to the memories of Willy Sachse, however, according to Horn, Sachse lost credibility by later published opposite statements e.g. in his work "Rost an Mann und Schiff (rust on man and ship)".

Huck, Pieken and Rogg see echoes of a classic drama as the diary describes hubris (arrogance) and fall of the world power ambitions of the German Empire manifested in the naval armaments. The diary also describes the erosion of the Wilhelmine class society in the Imperial Navy. Indeed, the person of Richard Stumpf reflected the fact, that the well trained workers who literally starved for education (as can also be seen in the working-class youth of that time) and constantly continued their education, did no longer want to be treated as children or animals by whippersnappers with a limited intellectual horizon, who sometimes found only access to their officers posts through the money of their parents.

== The time during and after the Weimar Republic ==
The information regarding this period is mainly based on Daniel Horn's studies. In an essay written in 1978, he describes that he received documents on Richard Stumpf from the Stumpf family (probably from Stumpf's son Hans, who had emigrated to the United States in 1950). Horn had these documents passed on to the archive of the Rutgers University Library. Meanwhile, the documents (or parts thereof) had been detected in the archive of the Leo Baeck Institute.

After the end of World War I Stumpf was unemployed and stayed in Neunkirchen near Nuremberg (Germany). In 1919 he joined the Freikorps to fight the Bavarian council government. He was persuaded by the argument, that this would be the desire of the government in Berlin and the diocese. Not yet having taken part in any actual fighting, he witnessed a massacre of members of the Catholic Journeymen Association of St. Joseph. The Freikorps members confined them to a cellar and threw hand grenades into it. Thereafter Stumpf left the Freikorps. Finally he concluded that the government forces lost about 18 men, while they killed about 5,000 men. According to Stumpf it was mainly cold-blooded murder.

In 1921 Stumpf married Anna Birzle and for the time being they stayed with his sister. From 1922 to 1924 he worked as a polisher in a metal factory in Nuremberg. This enabled him to start an own household, and their four sons were born.

In 1925 Stumpf attended meetings of the left-liberal German Democratic Party and through the intervention of the Nuremberg Mayor Hermann Luppe he got a job in his old profession and a flat. He started to write and publish on navy-historical and political issues, whereby he also criticised the rise of the Nazis. One of his articles came to the attention of Dr. Joos, who then conveyed a contact to the enquiry commission of the parliament. The commission was looking into the issues of who caused WWI, who were to blame for its continuation, and who for the German defeat. A longer stay in Berlin followed on the occasion of being appointed expert witness. Thereafter Stumpf worked again in his old profession and continued his literary activity. With the advent of Nazism Stumpf tried to enhance international understanding with France on the basis of common religious beliefs.

Under the dictatorship of the Nazis his diaries were burned and he was, according to his son Richard, denied adequate jobs. After the unemployment due to the global economic crisis Stumpf finally found a job as a hostel warden of the "Mainzerhof" of the Kolping Society in Heiligenstadt in Thuringia (Germany). There he spent the entire time of the Second World War. Because of his age and a bad rheumatism he was not enlisted, but he had to do occasional military work and guard services.

After the Second World War, he continued to live in the Heiligenstadt, which now belonged to the Soviet occupation zone. He became a policeman and participated in actions to arrest Nazis and their surrender to the authority. He became a member of the anti-fascist committees and joined the Christian Democratic Union (East Germany) in 1946, the successor party to the Catholic Centre Party (Germany), to which Stumpf was close because of his religious affiliation. He had known the President Jakob Kaiser from his apprenticeship period in Nuremberg.

Stumpf hid his service pistol, which he was given as a warden., when the Soviet troops marched into Heiligenstadt. It was later discovered, and a tenant of a house belonging to the Kolping restaurant was subsequently arrested. As Stumpf learned of this, he surrendered himself to the authorities, although a death sentence was possible for such offenses. He was abused, but was released in March 1946.

Under the German Democratic Republic regime, he was arrested after the uprising of 17 June 1953 and accused of anti-democratic activities: he had established relationships with Jakob Kaiser who stayed in West Berlin and given information to the bishop in Fulda on the occupying power and other organisations. During the detention period, he wrote another diary of his last period of life, which is probably stored in the above-mentioned archive of the Rutgers University in New Jersey (USA) or the similarly mentioned archive of the Leo Baeck Institute. The case was closed and Stumpf was discharged without conviction. At the instigation of his eldest son Lothar, Stumpf was rehabilitated in 1993.

In November 1953 Stumpf received permission upon request to adorn the war memorial in the Heinrich-Heine park in memory of the dead soldiers. When in the following year, the graves of dead Soviet soldiers were desecrated, Stumpf was suspected and arrested for anti-Soviet activities. He was however, released after lengthy interrogations because of proven innocence.

Stumpf died 23 July 1958.

== Reception of the diary in post-war Germany ==
In the official GDR historiography Stumpf's diary was not mentioned. It was not until the late 1970s, that it was described in publications of the military journalist Robert Rosentreter.

Also in West Germany historians recognized it relatively late. Wilhelm Deist mentioned the diary at various points of his historical work, for the first time in 1966 in his publication " Die Politik der Seekriegsleitung und die Rebellion der Flotte Ende Oktober 1918 (The politics of the Maritime Warfare Command and the rebellion in the fleet in late October 1918)". In a later lecture Deist described the disturbing influence the evacuation of Flanders at the beginning of October 1918 had on the sailors. This had been clearly indicated in Stumpf's diary. Because now an important base for the U-boat warfare had to be abandoned, the sailors and stokers realized definitely that the war was lost. In 1992, the Freiburg (Germany) historian and peace researcher Wolfram Wette published contributions to the history of everyday routine of war in the German military since the early modern period and included extracts from Stumpf's diary.

Since the early 1990s, Stumpf's diary has also been presented in the educational exhibition of the Naval Academy Mürwik (introduced by naval historian Dieter Hartwig in form of a colour copy of the original) and it is discussed in naval history classes.

In 2014, the German Navy Museum in Wilhelmshaven devoted Stumpf a major exhibition: Die Flotte schläft im Hafen ein – Kriegsalltag 1914–1918 in Matrosentagebüchern (The fleet falls asleep in the harbour – everyday war-routine 1914–1918 in sailors' diaries). Impressively constructed exhibits generated easily interpreted statements from Stumpf's diary alongside notes from a typescript of Carl Richard. This diary was discovered in 2013. Richard also served on board the SMS Helgoland.

== Publications ==
- Stumpf, Richard, Warum die Flotte zerbrach: Kriegstagebuch eines christlichen Arbeiters. Hrsg. Wilhelm Dittmann, Verlag J.H.W. Dietz Nachfolger, Berlin 1927, 213 pages (abridged version).
- Tagebuch des Matrosen Richard Stumpf. 'Erinnerungen' aus dem deutsch-englischen Seekriege auf S.M.S. Helgoland. (Das Werk des Untersuchungsausschusses des Deutschen Reichstages, Vierte Reihe, Zehnter Band, Zweiter Halbband), Deutsche Verlagsgesellschaft für Politik und Geschichte: Berlin 1928. X, 320 Seiten, 2 Faksimile der Handschrift, 1 Register (unabridged version).
- Horn, Daniel (Ed.), War, Mutiny and Revolution in the German Navy – The World War I Diary of Seaman Richard Stumpf. Rutgers University Press, New Brunswick, New Jersey (USA) 1967, VI,442 pages.
- Stumpf, Richard, Reichpietsch und Köbis mahnen! In: Illustrierte Reichsbanner Zeitung, 40, 1928, pp. 626–627.

== See also ==
- German Revolution of 1918-19
- Kiel mutiny
