= Vienna International Apartment =

Contemporary art venue in Helsinki, Finland

Vienna International Apartment is an exhibition venue for contemporary visual arts in Helsinki, Finland. It was created in Vienna, Austria in 2001, moved to Turku, Finland in 2003, to Helsinki, Finland in 2005, to Brussels, Belgium in 2007, to Geneva, Switzerland in 2010, to Helsinki, Finland in 2014, and to Berlin, Germany in 2015. In 2004, the Vienna International Apartment Art Association, a not-for-profit association established to support the activity, was registered in Finland.

Vienna International Apartment has run two exhibitions a year in the apartment of its founder Silvio Salgado (b. 1968), artist and curator. The aim of the project has been, through the art works and their presentation, to discuss issues related to the relation between public and private. As another distinctive feature, the exhibitions have aimed at bringing together artists and audiences from different backgrounds and experiences, nationalities, ages, interests and media, and the events have incorporated public talks and performances.

Vienna International Apartment has been involved in creating exhibitions in other museums and galleries including Wäinö Aaltonen Museum of Art, Finland; Helsinki School of Economics, Finland; Thomas K. Lang Gallery, Vienna, Austria; Museum Baluarte de la Candelaria, Cádiz, Spain; Instituto Camoes, Lisbon, Portugal; SECONDroom/ moorDNOCES Gallery, Brussels, Belgium; and PILOT International Art Forum, London, UK.

Vienna International Apartment exhibitions have been supported by Arts Council of Finland, Southwest Finland Arts Council, British Council, IASPIS - International Artists Studio Programme in Sweden, Austrian Federal Ministry for Education, the Arts and Culture, KulturKontakt Austria, Federal Chancellery of Austria, Arts Division, Geneva City Council, Turku City Council, Embassy of Finland, Vienna, Embassy of Austria, Helsinki, Embassy of Poland, Helsinki, Adam Mickiewicz Institute, Polish Ministry of Culture, Polish Institute in Vienna, and Vienna City Council; as well as the collaborators Secession, Exhibition Hall for Contemporary Art, Vienna, Wai Wai Space, Brussels, Sibelius Museum, Turku, FRAME - Finnish Fund for Art Exchange, IC - Instituto Camões, Ministry of Foreign Affairs of Portugal, Ibero-American Institute of Finland, Madrid, Embassy of Finland, Lisbon, Webster University, Vienna, Halikko Municipality, Wäinö Aaltonen Museum - Turku City Art Museum, Gallery Nunes, Helsinki, Helsinki School of Economics, Museum Baluarte de la Candelaria, Cádiz, Spain, and Cádiz City Council, Spain. Also private companies such Przekrój Magazine, Warsaw, Stilissimo BVBA, Brussels, LVI-Pepe Oy, Turku, Stockmann Oyj Abp, Turku, Bauhaus Finland, Raisio, Pub Uusi Apteekki, Turku, Zdenko Dworak Ges.mbH, Vienna, Salon Autosähkö, Salo, and House Etuve, Brussels have supported the projects.
