= Kiel mutiny =

Revolt by sailors of the German High Seas Fleet in 1918

- Part of the German Revolution of 1918–19 and WWI
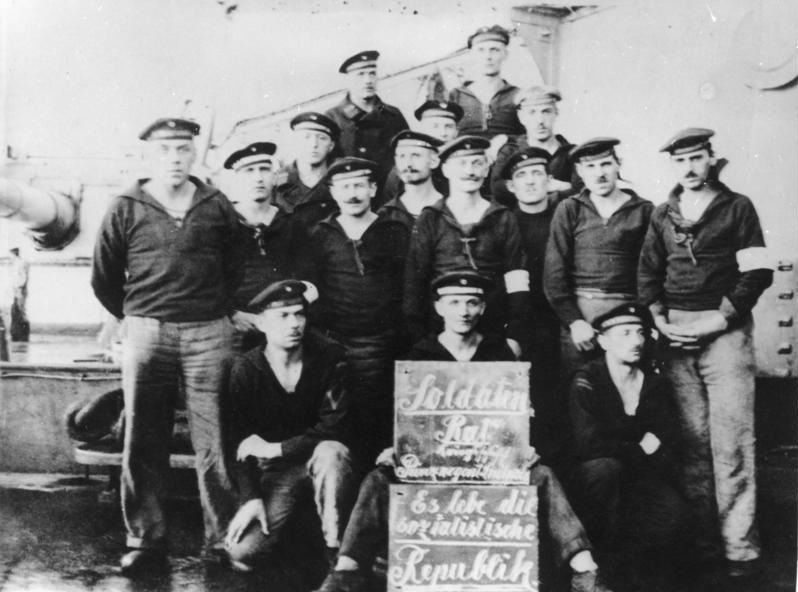
- Soldiers' council of the SMS Prinzregent Luitpold; The sign reads, "Soldiers' council ... long live the socialist republic"
| Date | 3–11 November 1918 |
| Location | Wilhelmshaven and Kiel, German Empire |
| Result | Start of German Revolution of 1918–1919 |

Belligerents
| Sailors of the Imperial Navy | Imperial Navy |

Commanders and leaders
| Karl Artelt; Lothar Popp | Wilhelm Souchon; (German Empire) Gustav Noske |

The Kiel mutiny (German: Kieler Matrosenaufstand) was a revolt by sailors of the German High Seas Fleet against the maritime military command in Kiel. The mutiny broke out on 3 November 1918 after sailors at Wilhelmshaven refused orders on 30 October to sail out for what was to be the final battle against the British Grand Fleet. The mutineers saw the planned battle, which had been ordered by the Admiralty without the knowledge or approval of the German government, as a futile "death voyage". They took over Kiel by means of workers' and soldiers' councils and then helped spread them across Germany. The German Revolution that was triggered by the councils swept aside the Hohenzollern monarchy within a few days, brought about the end of the German Empire and led to the establishment of the Weimar Republic.

== Background ==
=== Morale in the High Seas Fleet ===
Following the Battle of Jutland in mid-1916, the leadership of the German Empire did not want to risk losing additional ships that it would be unable to replace. The fleet had consequently lain for the most part idly at anchor since the battle. Many officers transferred from capital ships to submarines and light vessels, which still had a role to play in the fighting. They were generally replaced by young officers who did not know how to handle the more experienced crews. The discipline and spirit of those who remained with the capital ships consequently suffered.

Unrest in the fleet began in the summer of 1917. On the battleship Friedrich der Grosse, a system of shop stewards began to be established as early as March. During the following months, some sailors expressed dissatisfaction with their poor rations and treatment to representatives of the anti-war Independent Social Democratic Party (USPD). On 1 August, 49 men from the dreadnought SMS Prinzregent Luitpold disembarked without permission at Wilhelmshaven after a free watch and a movie showing were cancelled. Eleven were arrested and imprisoned. The next day, almost the entire crew of 600 men walked off in support of their comrades. Two of the ringleaders were later executed, and others sentenced to prison. During the remaining months of the war, secret sailors' councils were formed on some of the fleet's capital ships.

=== Political changes ===
On 29 September 1918, the Supreme Army Command informed Emperor Wilhelm II that the military situation was hopeless in the face of the enemy's overwhelming advantage in manpower and equipment. General Erich Ludendorff said that a request for an immediate ceasefire should be sent to the Entente powers. In hopes of more favorable peace terms, he also recommended accepting American president Woodrow Wilson's demand that the imperial government be democratized. His aim was to protect the reputation of the Imperial Army by placing the responsibility for the capitulation and its consequences at the feet of the democratic parties and the Reichstag.

Emperor Wilhelm II appointed Prince Maximilian of Baden the new imperial chancellor on 3 October. The Prince was considered a liberal and was a representative of the royal family. His cabinet included, for the first time, members of the Social Democratic Party (SPD). The following day, the new government offered the Allies the truce on which Ludendorff had insisted, and, on the fifth, the German public was informed of the dismal situation that its military was facing. Even up to that late point, government propaganda and the press had led the people to believe that the war would still be won. The shock of the impending defeat caused a "paralytic bitterness and deep resignation" that eased the way for those who wanted an immediate ceasefire.

=== Naval order of 24 October 1918 ===
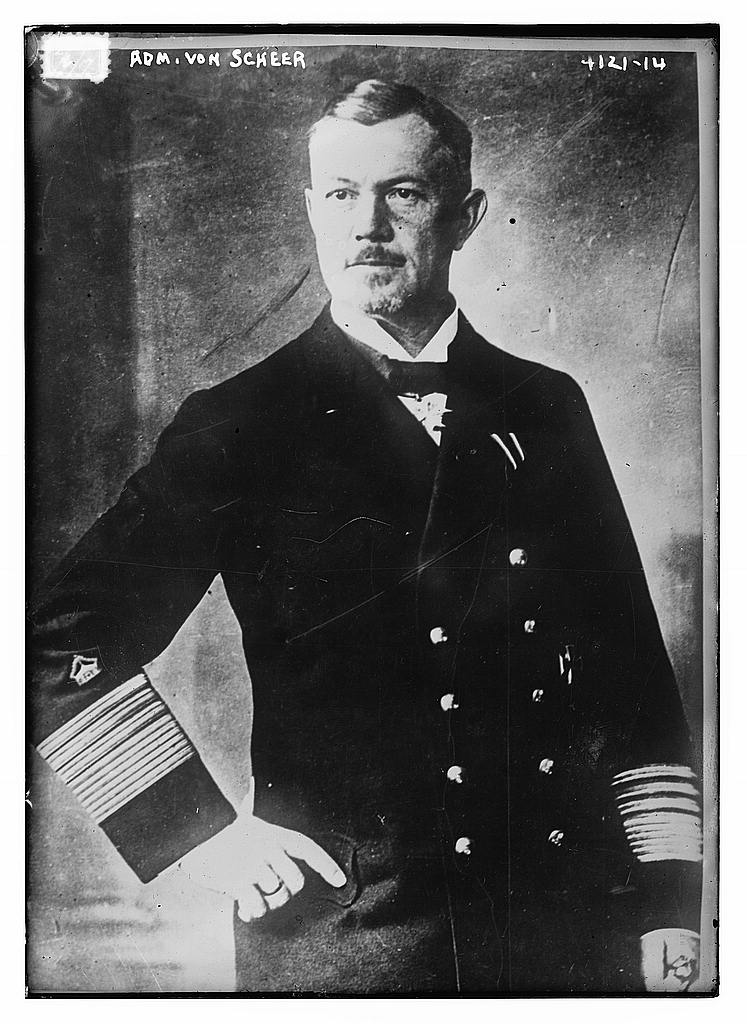
Admiral Reinhard Scheer, who ordered the attack on the British Navy that sparked the Kiel mutiny

Following the Allied successes during the Hundred Days Offensive, the new German government under Prince Max of Baden, at the insistence of the Supreme Army Command, asked President Woodrow Wilson on 5 October 1918 to mediate an armistice. One of Wilson's preconditions was the cessation of Germany's submarine war. Despite the objections of Admiral Scheer, the Chief of the German Admiralty Staff, the government made the concession on 20 October, and the submarines at sea were recalled on 21 October. The following day, Scheer, on his own authority and without the knowledge of the new German government, ordered Admiral Hipper, commander of the High Seas Fleet, to prepare to attack the British with the main battle fleet, reinforced by the newly available submarines. Hipper's order was promulgated on 24 October, and Scheer approved it on 27 October. The fleet then began to concentrate at Schillig Roads off Wilhelmshaven to prepare for the battle.

Historian Michael Epkenhans describes the action as a mutiny by the admirals:

When we think of the end of the war in 1918, we have to imagine admirals who had hoped throughout the war to be able to fight a major naval battle, perhaps even to defeat the British. The naval leadership was basically itself mutinous; it was an admirals' rebellion, because contrary to the orders of the political Reich leadership to hold back, especially in regard to the armistice, it made plans that were not politically legitimized.

For the admirals, the battle was a matter of saving their honor and their futures. The commander of the battleship Thüringen spoke later of going down with "the flag flying". The Chief of Staff of the High Seas Fleet Command, Rear Admiral Adolf von Trotha, wrote to the Chief of Staff of the Naval War Command, Captain Magnus von Levetzow: "We are seized with horror and shame at the thought that the fleet could be consigned to internal ruin without having come to blows." Levetzow replied: "As long as we are still able to fight, we will never, ever agree to a peace treaty that is based on the degradation or atrophy of our fleet."

== The uprising ==
=== Wilhelmshaven mutiny ===
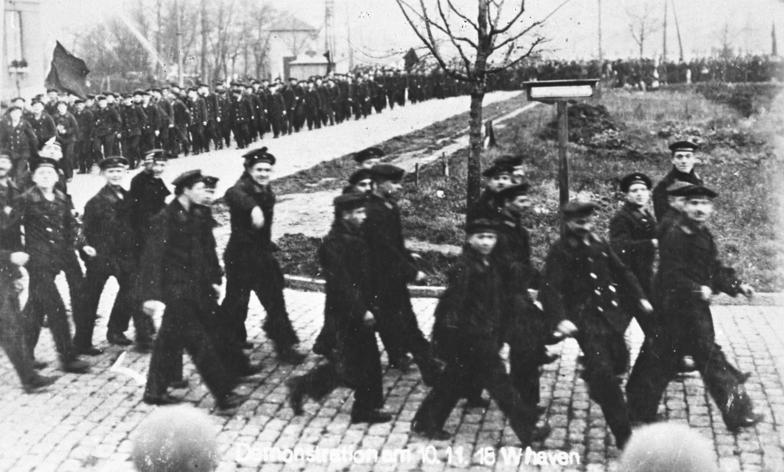
Sailors demonstrating at Wilhelmshaven, 10 November 1918

When word of the planned battle reached the sailors, some of the men on the ships at anchor in the Schillig Roads off Wilhelmshaven refused to put their lives at risk for a "death voyage" that they saw as militarily pointless. During the night of 30 to 31 October 1918, sailors on board a number of ships from III Battle Squadron declined to weigh anchor. Incidents of insubordination occurred aboard the dreadnoughts Thüringen, SMS Kaiserin and SMS Helgoland, with outright mutiny on Thüringen and Helgoland.

After a brief standoff during which the ships that had mutinied and those that had not stood with their cannons pointed at each other, the mutineers yielded. The naval command nevertheless had to drop its plans to attack the British fleet, since they felt that the crews' loyalty could no longer be relied upon. III Squadron was ordered back to Kiel.

=== Sailors' revolt in Kiel ===
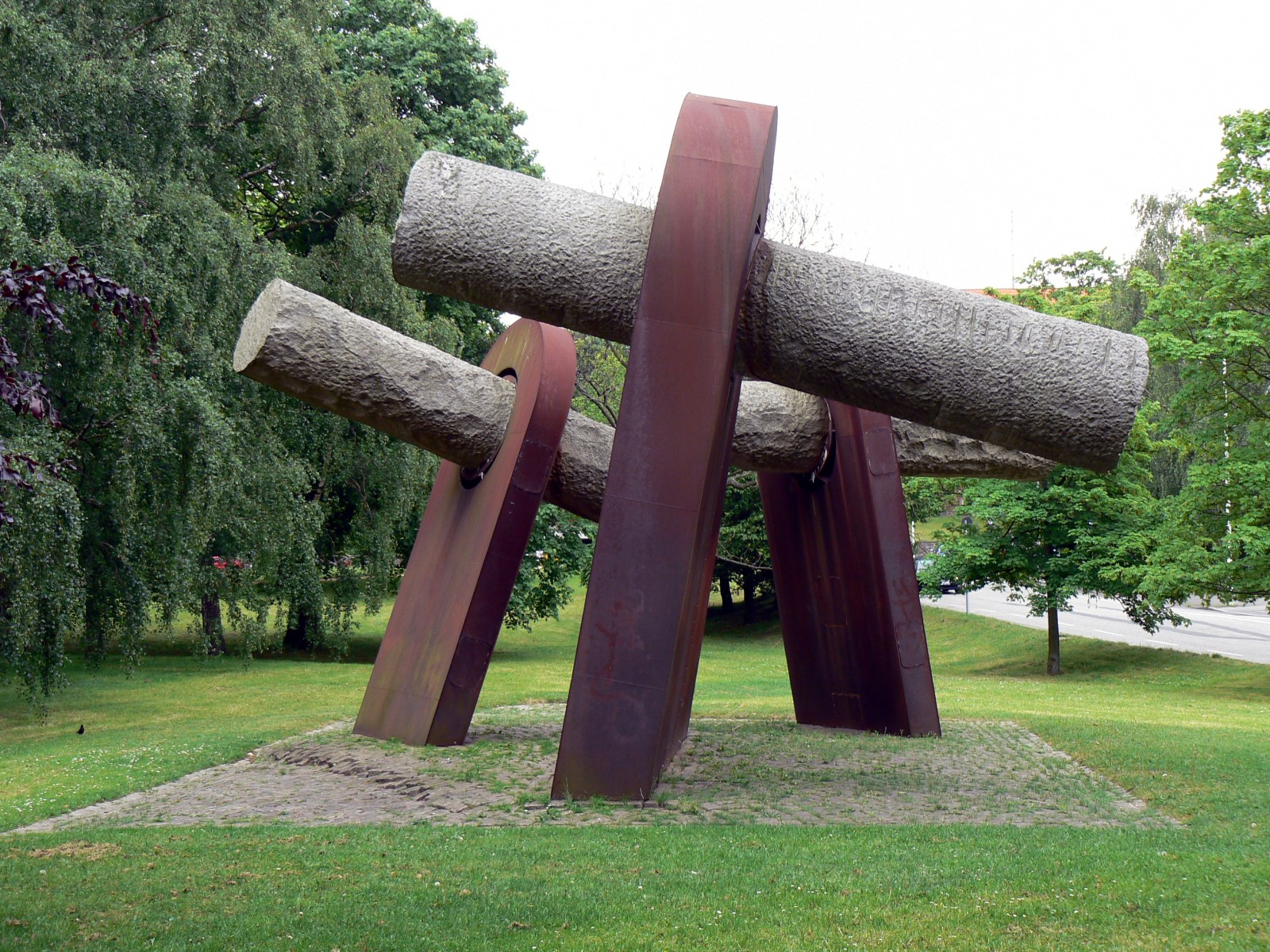
Sculpture in Kiel to commemorate the 1918 sailors' mutiny

During the squadron's return, its commander, Vice Admiral Hugo Kraft, exercised a maneuver with his battleships in the Heligoland Bight. When it "functioned perfectly", he believed he was in command of his crews again. While moving through the Kiel Canal he had 47 sailors from the Markgraf, who were seen as the ringleaders, arrested. On its way to Kiel, the squadron stopped at Holtenau, where nearly 150 mutineers were put under arrest to be transported to the military prison in Kiel and to Fort Herwarth in the north of the city.

The sailors and stokers sought to prevent the fleet from setting sail again and to gain the release of their comrades. Some 250 met on the evening of 1 November in the Union House at Kiel. The delegations they sent to their officers requesting the mutineers' release were rebuffed. With the sailors looking for closer ties to the socialist labor unions, the police closed the Union House, leading to an even larger open-air meeting of sailors and workers on 2 November at a large drill ground.

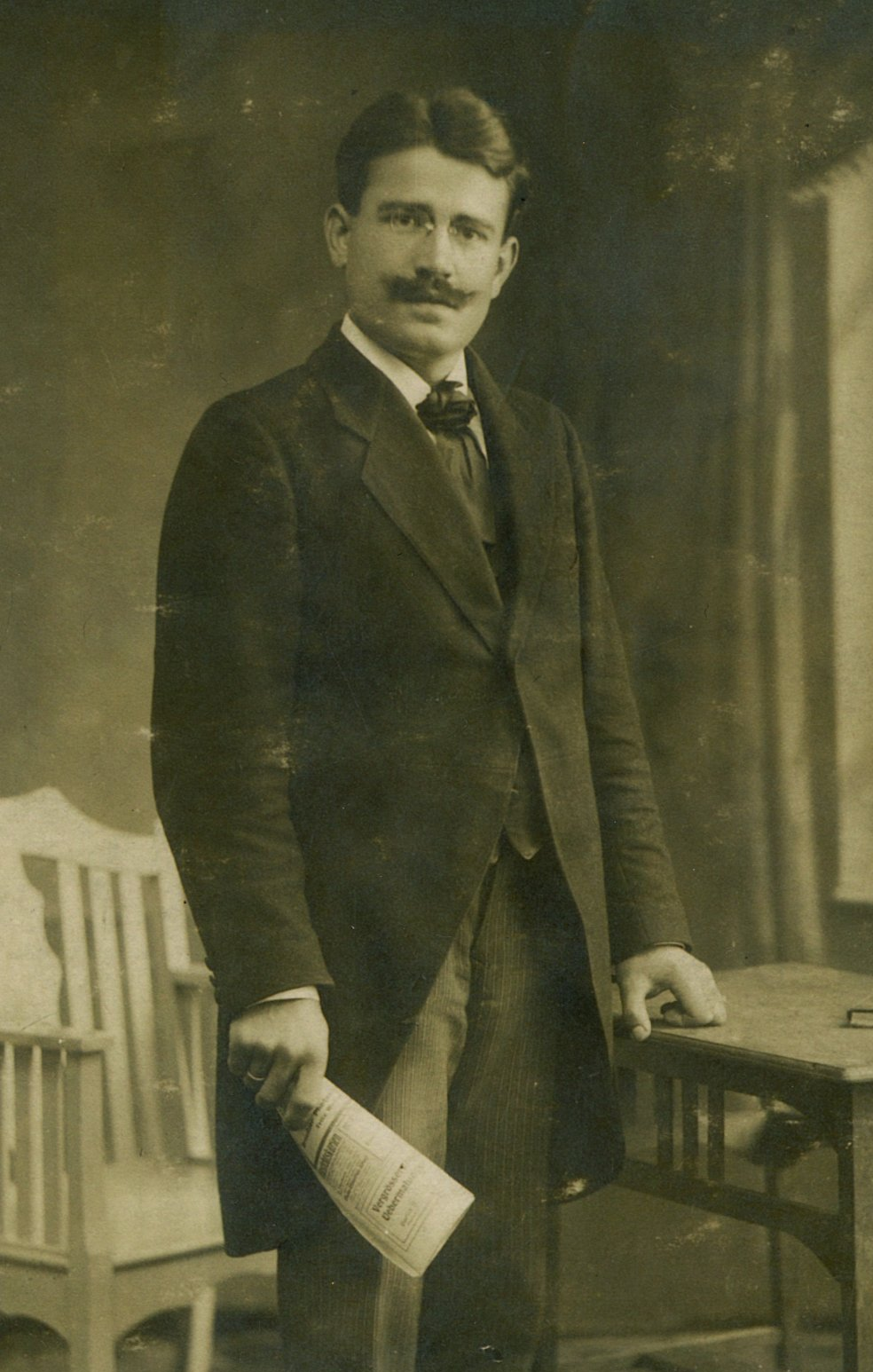
Karl Artelt, one of the leaders of the Kiel mutiny, in 1917

Led by Karl Artelt, who worked in the repair shipyard for torpedo boats in Kiel-Wik, and by the mobilized shipyard worker Lothar Popp, both members of the USPD, the sailors called for a large meeting the following day at the same place. The call was heeded by several thousand people on the afternoon of 3 November, with workers' representatives also present. The slogan Frieden und Brot (peace and bread) was raised, showing that the sailors and workers demanded not only the release of the imprisoned seamen but also the end of the war and the improvement of food provisions. The protestors cheered Artelt's call to free the prisoners, and they set off in the direction of the military prison.

A Lieutenant Steinhäuser, commanding the troops who had orders to stop the demonstrators, ordered his patrol to fire warning shots and then to shoot directly into the crowd. Seven men were killed and 29 seriously wounded. Some demonstrators also opened fire. Steinhäuser was shot and beaten with rifle butts but survived. After the incident, the demonstrators dispersed and the patrol withdrew. Historian Sebastian Haffner called the shooting of Steinhäuser the first shot of the Revolution, following which the sailors could no longer go back.

=== Takeover of Kiel ===
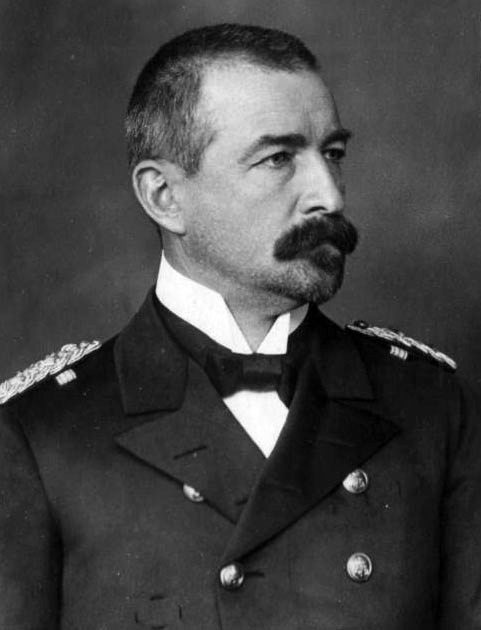
Admiral Wilhelm Souchon, governor of the naval station at Kiel

Wilhelm Souchon, the governor of the naval station, initially asked for outside troops to help suppress the uprising but revoked his request when his staff claimed the situation was under control. Souchon had been sent to Kiel only a few days earlier, on 30 October 1918, and therefore had to rely heavily on his staff. On 4 November, however, the request was renewed, and six infantry companies were brought to Kiel.

On the morning of 4 November, groups of mutineers marched through central Kiel accompanied by striking workers. They were joined in the afternoon by sailors from the barracks north of the city. After the soldiers sent in to reinforce the local troops sided with the demonstrators, Admiral Souchon freed the imprisoned sailors and asked the insurgents to send a delegation to discuss the situation. On the same day, Karl Artelt organized the first soldiers' council, and soon many more were set up.

Soldiers and workers brought public and military institutions in Kiel under their control. When, against Souchon's promise, additional troops came to put down the rebellion, they were intercepted by the mutineers and either sent back or joined the sailors and workers. By the evening of 4 November, Kiel was firmly in the hands of approximately 40,000 rebellious sailors, soldiers and workers, as was Wilhelmshaven two days later.

=== Sailors' demands ===
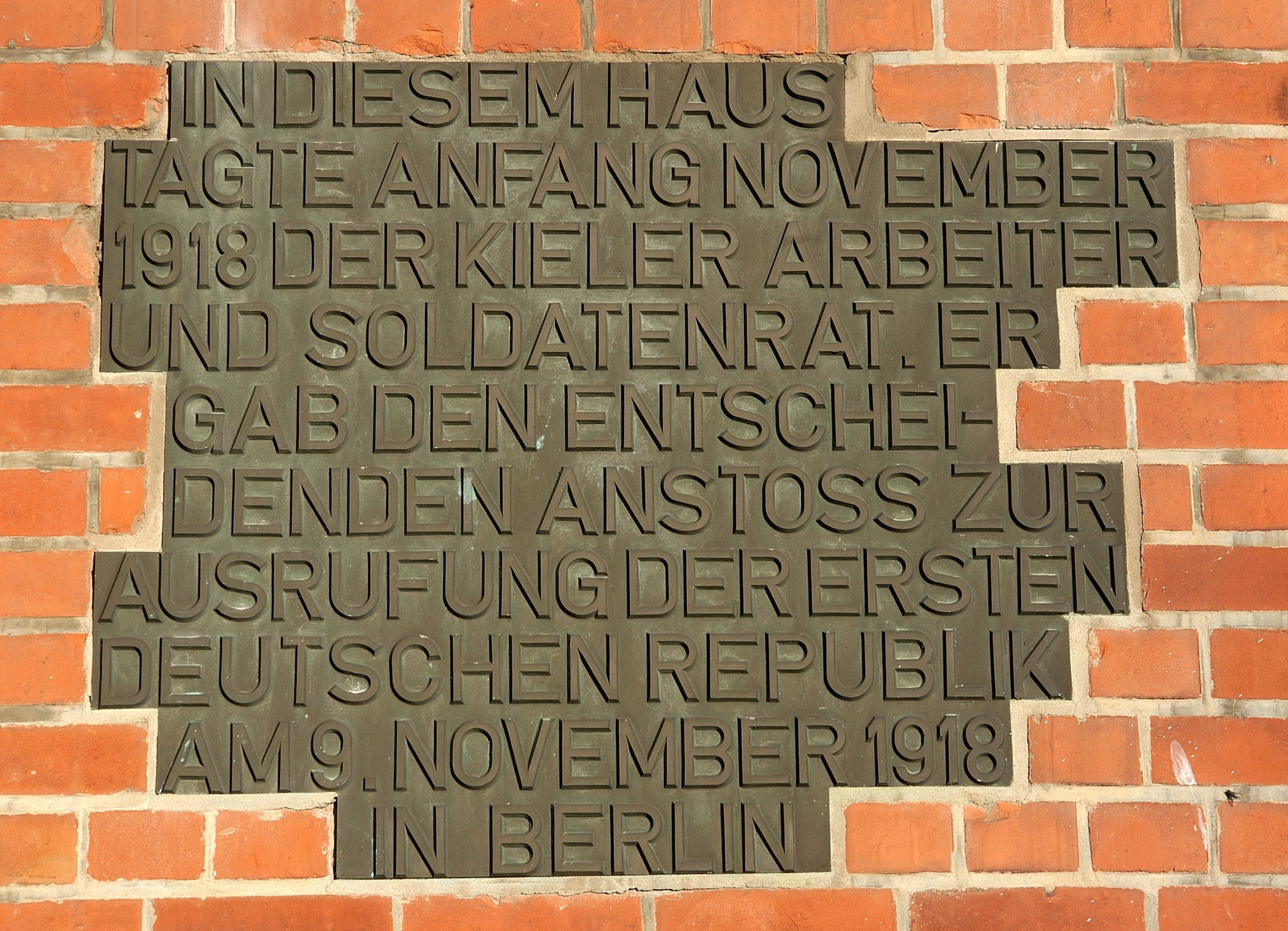
Plaque at the Union House in Kiel saying that the workers' and soldiers' council gathered here during the sailors' mutiny and gave the decisive impulse for the proclamation of the first German republic

Late in the evening of 4 November, sailors' and workers' representatives met in the Union House with Souchon and two representatives of the Social Democratic Party, Gustav Noske and Conrad Haussmann, who had been sent by the government in Berlin to negotiate an end to the uprising. At the meeting, the soldiers presented the Kiel 'Fourteen Points', which were promulgated as orders of the soldiers' council that were to be binding for every military person:

Resolutions and demands of the soldiers' council:

1. The release of all inmates and political prisoners.
2. Complete freedom of speech and the press.
3. The abolition of mail censorship.
4. Appropriate treatment of crews by superiors.
5. No punishment for comrades on returning from ships and to the barracks.
6. The launching of the fleet is to be prevented under all circumstances.
7. Any defensive measures involving bloodshed are to be prevented.
8. The withdrawal of all troops not belonging to the garrison.
9. All measures for the protection of private property will be determined immediately by the soldiers' council.
10. Superiors will no longer be recognized outside of duty.
11. Unlimited personal freedom of every man from the end of his tour of duty until the beginning of his next tour of duty
12. Officers who declare themselves in agreement with the measures of the newly established soldiers' council are welcomed in our midst. All the others must quit their duty without entitlement to provision.
13. Every member of the soldiers' council is to be released from any duty.
14. All measures to be introduced in the future can only be introduced with the consent of the soldiers' council.

Dirk Dähnhardt, in his 1978 doctoral thesis, came to the conclusion that "the 14 Points of Kiel were ... mainly an attack on the military system; political objectives were lacking." Dähnhardt attributes this to the heterogeneous composition of the bodies and to the intention to first of all issue a catalogue of immediate measures.

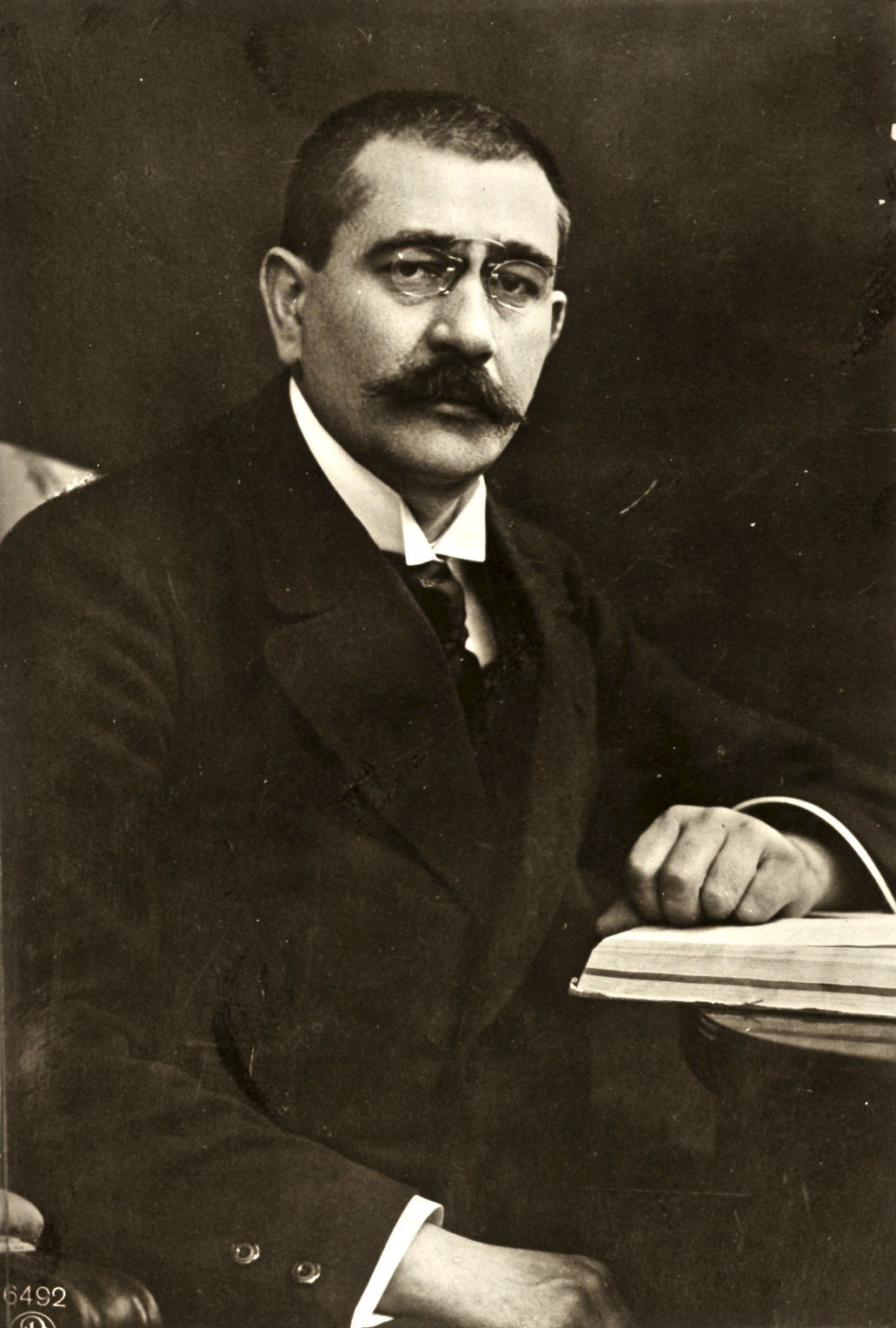
Gustav Noske, the SPD politician who was elected chairman of the Kiel soldiers' council

The sailors elected Noske chairman of the soldiers' council, since as a Social Democrat he was seen to be on their side. He was elected chairman of the council and reinstated peace and order in Kiel. Some days later he took over the governor's post, while Lothar Popp from the USPD ensured that the initially spontaneously formed, unstructured soldiers' councils had a solid base through elections in all units and through the establishment of the Supreme Soldiers' Council, of which he was the elected chairman. During the following weeks Noske was able to reduce the influence of the councils, but he could not prevent the sailors from spreading the revolution across Germany. On the morning of 5 November, the red flag of the revolution was hoisted on the ships of the Imperial Navy in Kiel's harbor.

During the ensuing events, councils all over Germany oriented themselves on Kiel's 14 points. Dähnhardt saw the political shortsightedness as a major reason for the dissolution of soldiers' councils after six months. Wolfram Wette from the German Armed Forces Military History Research Office noted: "... the Kiel signal ... did not point in the direction of a council state according to the Bolshevist example. Instead it stood ... for the demand for the fastest possible ending of the war. Secondly it pointed – starting with the 'Kiel 14 points' – ... in the direction of a liberal, social and democratic political system, in which especially militarism ... should no longer have place."

== Aftermath: German Revolution of 1918–19 ==
Detachments of revolutionary sailors moved out from Kiel to all major German cities beginning on 4 November. They encountered almost no resistance in their takeover of civil and military power; only in Lübeck and Hanover did two local commanders attempt to maintain military discipline by force of arms. On 6 November, Wilhelmshaven was in the hands of a workers' and soldiers' council; by 7 November all the larger coastal cities plus Frankfurt am Main, Stuttgart and Munich were as well. King Ludwig III of Bavaria was overthrown on the same day, making him the first German federal prince to fall. The revolution reached Berlin on 9 November, and on the same day the abdication of Emperor Wilhelm II was proclaimed. By the end of the month, the dynastic rulers of all the other German states had abdicated without bloodshed.

Early in January 1919, supporters of a council republic and those who wanted Germany to become a parliamentary republic began to engage in bloody street battles. The latter group had the support of what remained of the German Army and of the paramilitary Freikorps. Their victory cleared the way for the establishment of the Weimar Republic in August 1919.

== See also ==
- End of World War I
- German Revolution of 1918–1919
- Richard Stumpf (his war diary is a valuable source for information on the relationship between officers and enlisted men in the navy)

Naval mutinies:

- Soldat fusillé pour l'exemple
- Spithead and Nore mutinies
- Chilean naval mutiny of 1931
- HNLMS De Zeven Provinciën (1909)#Mutiny
- Royal Indian Navy Mutiny
- Kronstadt rebellion
- Invergordon Mutiny
- Revolt of the Lash

== Literature ==
- Dirk Dähnhardt: Revolution in Kiel. Der Ubergang vom Kaiserreich zur Weimarer Republik. Karl Wachholtz Verlag, Neumünster, 1978, ISBN 3-529-02636-0
- Horn, Daniel, German Naval Mutinies of World War I, Rutgers University Press, New Brunswick, New Jersey (USA), 1969.
- Horn, Daniel (Ed.), War, Mutiny and Revolution in the German Navy – The World War I Diary of Seaman Richard Stumpf. Rutgers University Press, New Brunswick, New Jersey (USA) 1967, VI,442 S.,
- Wolfram Wette: Gustav Noske – eine politische Biographie. Droste Verlag, 1987, ISBN 3-7700-0728-X
- Wolfram Wette: Gustav Noske und die Revolution in Kiel 1918. Boyens Buchverlag, Heide 2010, ISBN 978-3-8042-1322-7; published as special edition from the Gesellschaft für Kieler Stadtgeschichte, by Jürgen Jensen, Band 64

== Films ==
- Documentary film "In Kiel ist Revolution!" 53 minutes, 2018 (German version as DVD, English version as high definition mp4 format). By Kay Gerdes and Klaus Kuhl, published by the Gesellschaft für Kieler Stadtgeschichte e.V. as "Historische Filmdokumente Nr. 9". Sponsored by City of Kiel and Filmförderung Hamburg Schleswig-Holstein. The film highlights in detail the events in November 1918 in Kiel and presents them in a larger historical frame. The authors employ historical film and photo material, footage from original locations, interviews from the 1970s and 1980s with contemporary witnesses (among them Lothar Popp, one of the leaders of the uprising) and explanations by the historian, peace researcher and Noske biographer Prof. Wolfram Wette. Hints for teachers, information on the used sources and the complete text are available online:
