= Karl Artelt =

German revolutionary (1890–1981)

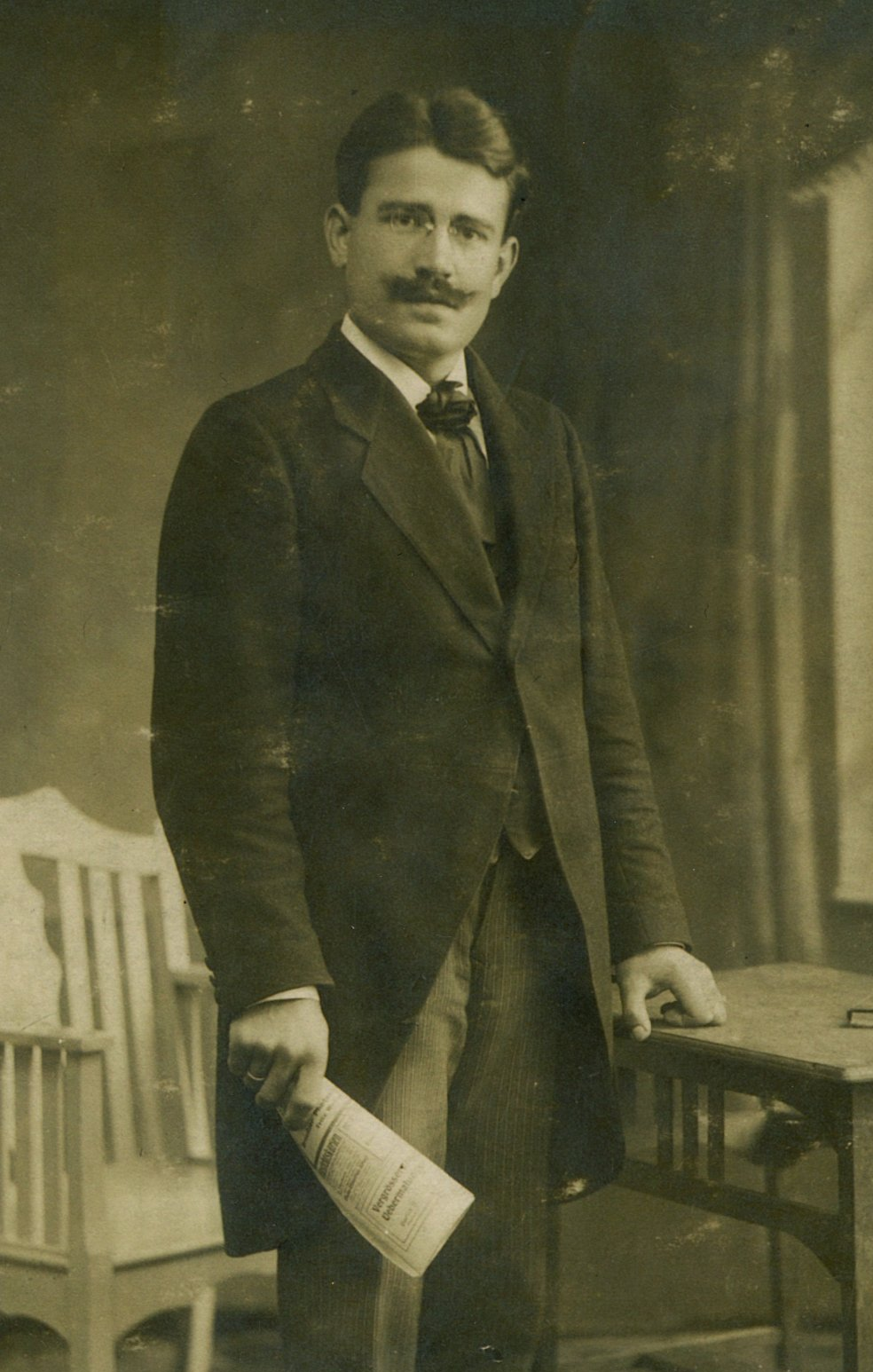
- Karl Artelt in April 1917 when he was tried by the extra ordinary court martial in Kiel; the photo was sent as post card on 2 November 1917 from the fortress prison Groß-Strehlitz to his brother in law Walter Heinke in Magdeburg-Salbke
- Born: 31 December 1890; German Empire
- Died: 28 September 1981 (aged 90); East Germany

Karl Artelt (31 December 1890 – 28 September 1981) was a German revolutionary and a leader of the sailors' revolt in Kiel.

== Birth and education ==
Karl Artelt was born on 31 December 1890 in the German village of Salbke, at Repkowstr. 12, which was later suburbanized into Magdeburg, the son of engine operator August Artelt and his wife Marie. He attended the eight-classes primary school and thereafter did an apprenticeship with the machine production company R. Wolf in Magdeburg and became a qualified engine fitter. There, he worked together with Erich Weinert, later a well-known poet, who taught him the basics of Marxism.

== Party memberships ==
In 1908 he became a member of the SPD (Sozialdemokratische Partei Deutschlands) and later joined the USPD (Unabhängige Sozialdemokratische Partei Deutschlands). In spring 1919 he was one of the founders of the KPD (Kommunistische Partei Deutschlands) in Magdeburg and in 1946 he joined the SED (Sozialistische Einheitspartei Deutschlands).

== East-Asia ==
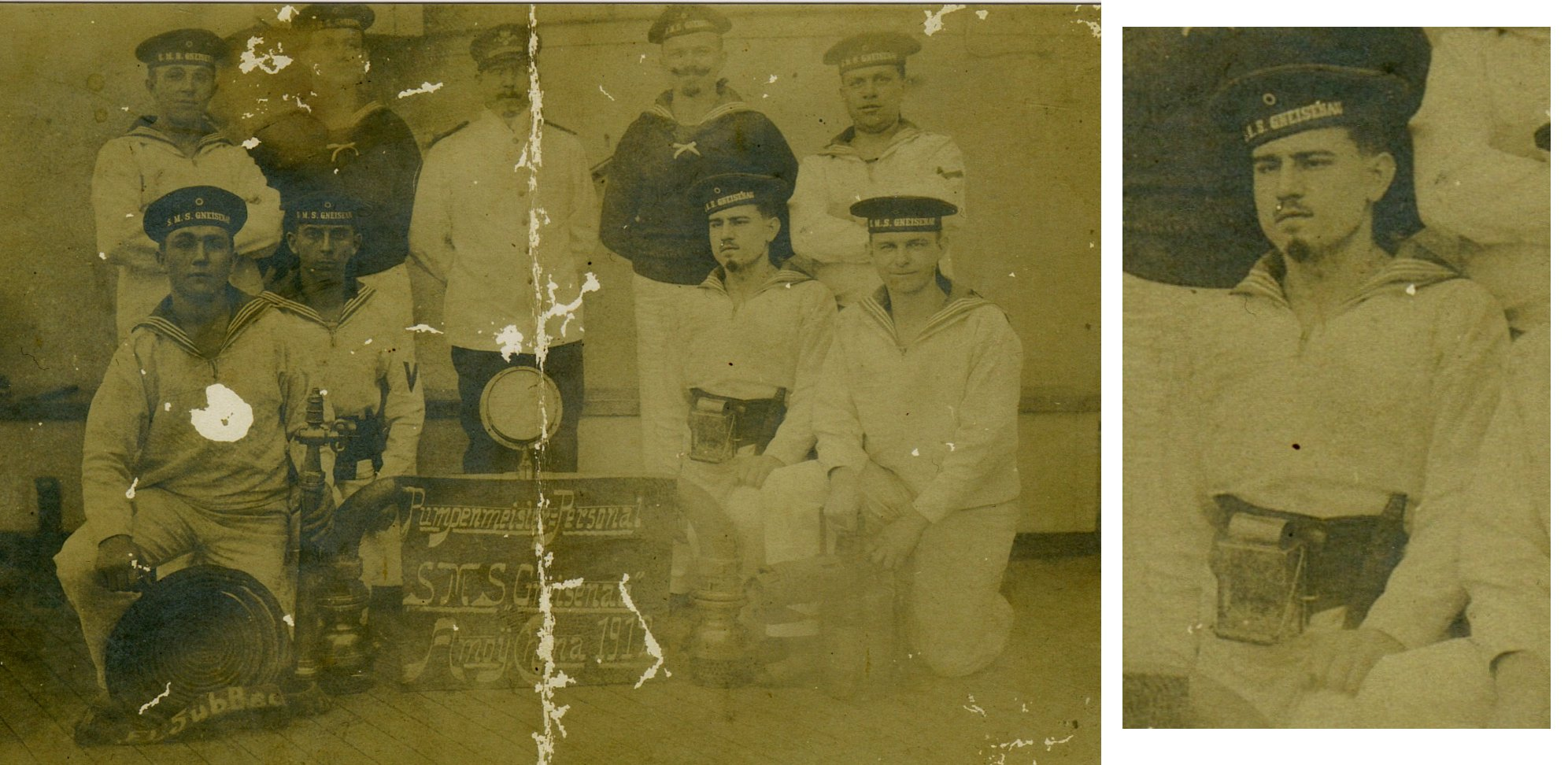
Karl Artelt on board the "Gneisenau" 1912 (lower row, second from right and detail enlargement); the board between the sailors reads: Pumpenmeister Personal SMS "Gneisenau", Amoij, China 1912 (master pump personnel SMS "Gneisenau", Amoij, China 1912)

In 1908 he was hired by the Hamburg-Amerikanische Packetfahrt-Actien-Gesellschaft – HAPAG, an international shipping line and spent some years amongst others as a stoker; these vessels were used to move copra in the South Seas. Two years later he was conscripted into the German navy, serving as a stoker and later as a pump specialist on board the armoured cruiser Gneisenau of the German East-Asia fleet in Qingdao (Tsingtau). He became a contemporary witness of the Bourgeois revolution in China led by Dr. Sun Yat-sen. In September 1913 he returned to Magdeburg as a reservist and resumed his job at the Wolf factory.

== First World War ==
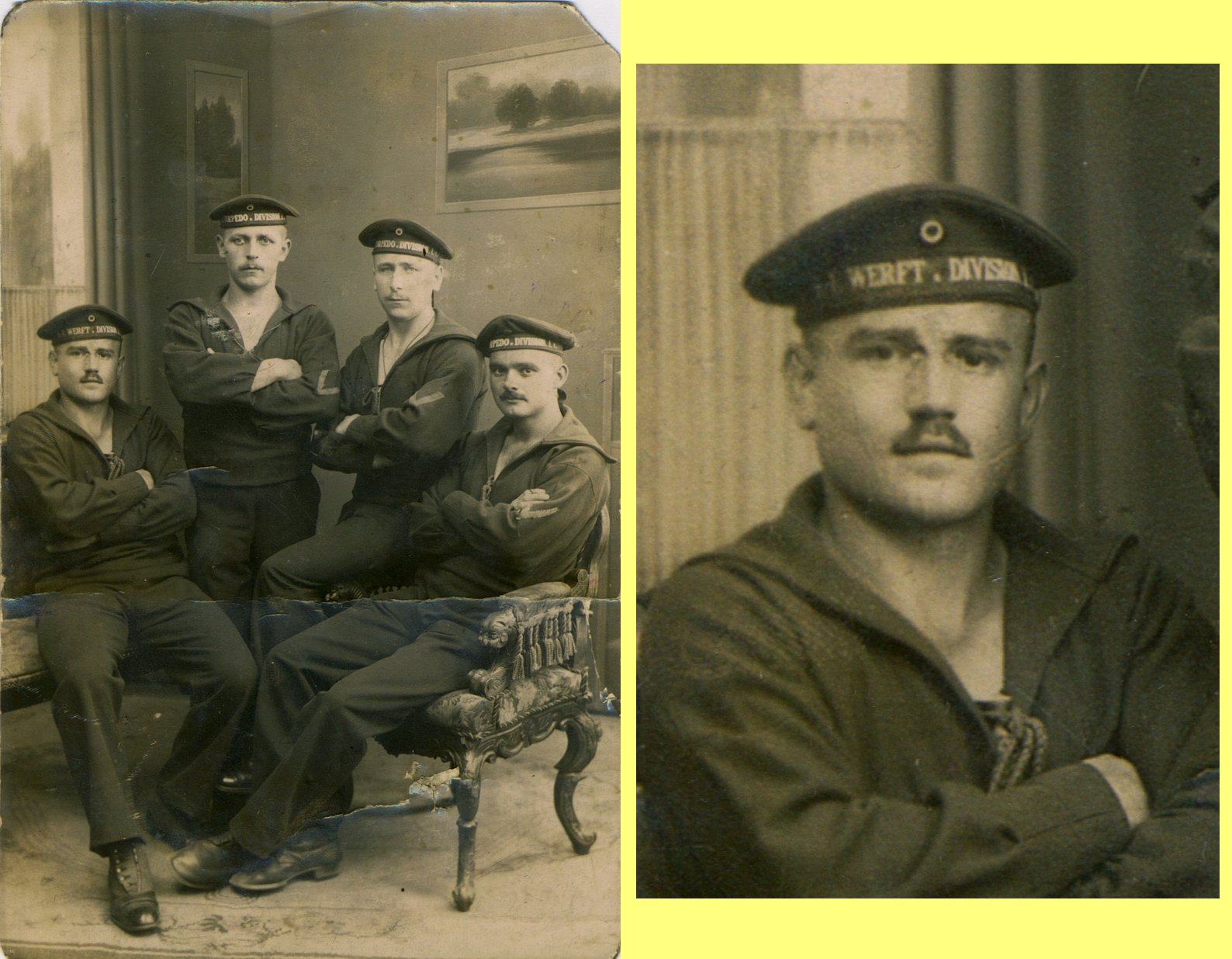
Karl Artelt, 1st Werft-Division, left, (enlarged detail right), together with comrades of the 1st Torpedo-Division in Kiel-Wik, September 1914

When the first world war broke out he had to rejoin the navy, this time as an administrative clerk in the 1. Werft Division at Kiel-Wik.

At the beginning of 1915, he was detached to the Germania shipyard in Kiel as an engine fitter. After some months he was elected shop steward for the German metal workers union for the shipyard. In mid May 1916 the general war situation and the food supply in Kiel had deteriorated to such an extent that on 14 June, when the first early potatoes were distributed, there were assaults on sales points and storage halls. The following morning large numbers of the Germania shipyard workers went on strike. Karl Artelt was one of the strike leaders. During the winter the food supply situation worsened. At the end of March 1917, it was announced that bread rations were to be reduced. In protest 1,450 workers from the Howaldt shipyard and 4,000 workers from the Germania shipyard downed tools. Artelt was a member of the strike committee. He was apprehended because of these activities and tried at a court martial, where he was sentenced to six months in a fortress prison, which he had to serve at Groß-Strehlitz in Upper Silesia.

Living in the prison with different officials from the workers movement had a sustainable influence on him. In one photograph he can be seen together with Prof. Dr. med. Krahn from Antwerp and Joseph Verlinden, president of the metal workers' union and leader of the Social Democratic Party of Antwerp.

When released from prison he received marching orders to move to Flanders, where he had to join the punishment battalion of the 2. Marine-Pioneerbataillon. When later Artelt protested against a leaflet of the military newspaper An Flanderns Küste, which according to his statement, "heavily insulted" the striking ammunition workers in Germany, he was sent to a mental home in Bruges. However, after six weeks of medical observation, a doctor ascertained his nerves were perfectly healthy. Soon thereafter he was transported back to Germany by express train.

Minutes of the Marinestation in Kiel mention Artelt as one of the "Haupthetzer (main agitators)" in a gathering in the union house on 12 April 1918. The record says he has, still as a member of the Sipyard Division (Werftdivision), addressed numerous sailors and workers. Mid-May 1918 he sent a postcard from a military hospital in Hamburger to his mother. It remains unclear, why he was admitted to this hospital.

After reporting to the division commander in Kiel, there were difficulties in detaching him: his former unit sent him to the "Matrosen Division" (sailors' division). However, he was rejected. Through a Captain Ludolf, who knew him from his case in 1917, he was eventually placed in the Torpedo Division (barracks in Kiel-Wik), where he worked in the torpedo boat repair workshop. Other sources wrongly indicate the torpedo workshop in Kiel-Friedrichsort. As a specialist of pumps he supervised a group of shipyard workers who had to work for the navy. He used his job to secretly re-establish the navy shop stewards system, which had been smashed in 1917.

== Kiel mutiny ==
Lothar Popp and Karl Artelt became the leaders of the sailors' mutiny in Kiel in November 1918. Artelt was the first to raise political demands, including the "introduction of universal, equal and secret suffrage for both sexes" and founded the first soldiers' council on 4 November 1918. As a representative of that council, he was asked by governor Souchon to meet him for negotiations. Together with other sailors' representatives they went by car from Kiel-Wik to the Naval Station carrying a large red flag. Artelt personally confronted some of those troops who came to quell the uprising and convinced them to either move back or to support the mutineers. On 10 December 1918, Artelt became Lothar Popp's successor as chairman of the Supreme Soldiers' Council in Kiel. Popp remained in the council (probably only pro forma) as a political advisor.

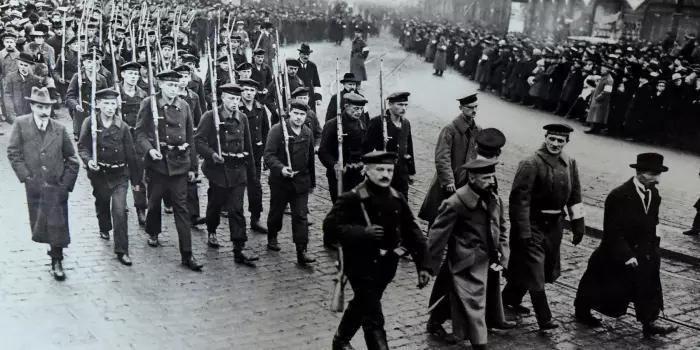
Wrongly assigned to Kiel.

The town archive Kiel keeps a photograph that was seen for a long time as depicting the burial procession for the victims of the revolution on 10 November 1918. Some identified Lothar Popp, Gustav Noske and Karl Artelt in the photo. The grandson of the latter, also Karl Artelt, was sure that his grandfather was the person second from left in the first row. However in February 2015 the town archive Kiel ascertained, following a hint from Matthias Sperwien, that this photo showed the funeral procession of 20 November 1918 in Berlin and not in Kiel for the victims of the revolution in the capital.

"Well into the Hitler war" a memorial plaque made of bronze was said to have been attached to the barracks building of the fifth company of the I. Torpedobootdivision in Kiel Wik, which read: Hier brach am 4. November 1918 unter Führung von Karl Artelt die deutsche Revolution aus; ("Here started the German revolution on 4 November 1918 led by Karl Artelt").

Despite severe political antagonism, even Gustav Noske, who had come to Kiel to bring the uprising to an end, treated Artelt with respect; Noske wrote in "Von Kiel bis Kapp" (p. 52) about Artelt: "....he [Lothar Popp], was replaced by the inactive senior stoker Artelt, a personally honest man, who lost influence rapidly however, when he started to propagate Spartakistic ideas." Artelt resigned from the Supreme Council of Soldiers on 6 January 1919. The balance of power had shifted fundamentally, among other things, due to demobilization. On 6 January 1919, the Supreme Soldiers' Council, against the opposition of Artelt and Popp, gave its consent to the establishment of the 1st Marine-Brigade (also called the Iron Brigade or Division), which sailed for Berlin three days later to support the government against leftist forces. This may have led to Artelt's resignation. He was discharged from the Navy towards the end of January 1919 and left Kiel. Artelt later provided two justifications for his resignation:

In letters in the late 1950s, he wrote that he had resigned because he had been unable to prevail in the Soldiers' Council against Noske's opposition to sending the ships to be interned under the Armistice to Leningrad instead of Scapa Flow. However, this does not fit with the date of his resignation, 6 January 1919. The fleet left Kiel on 18 November, and Noske went back to Berlin on 27 December. In a short CV written in 1960, on the other hand, he justified his resignation with the fact that Noske was torpedoing his demand to build a "powerful Red Force". But in fact, the Soldiers' Council had prevailed over Noske at the end of December 1918 with the construction of a revolutionary security force. It was probably inconceivable to Artelt, given the conflicts in Berlin, that under his chairmanship the Kiel Supreme Soldiers' Council would allow a force to be sent to Berlin to support the government.

== Weimar Republic ==
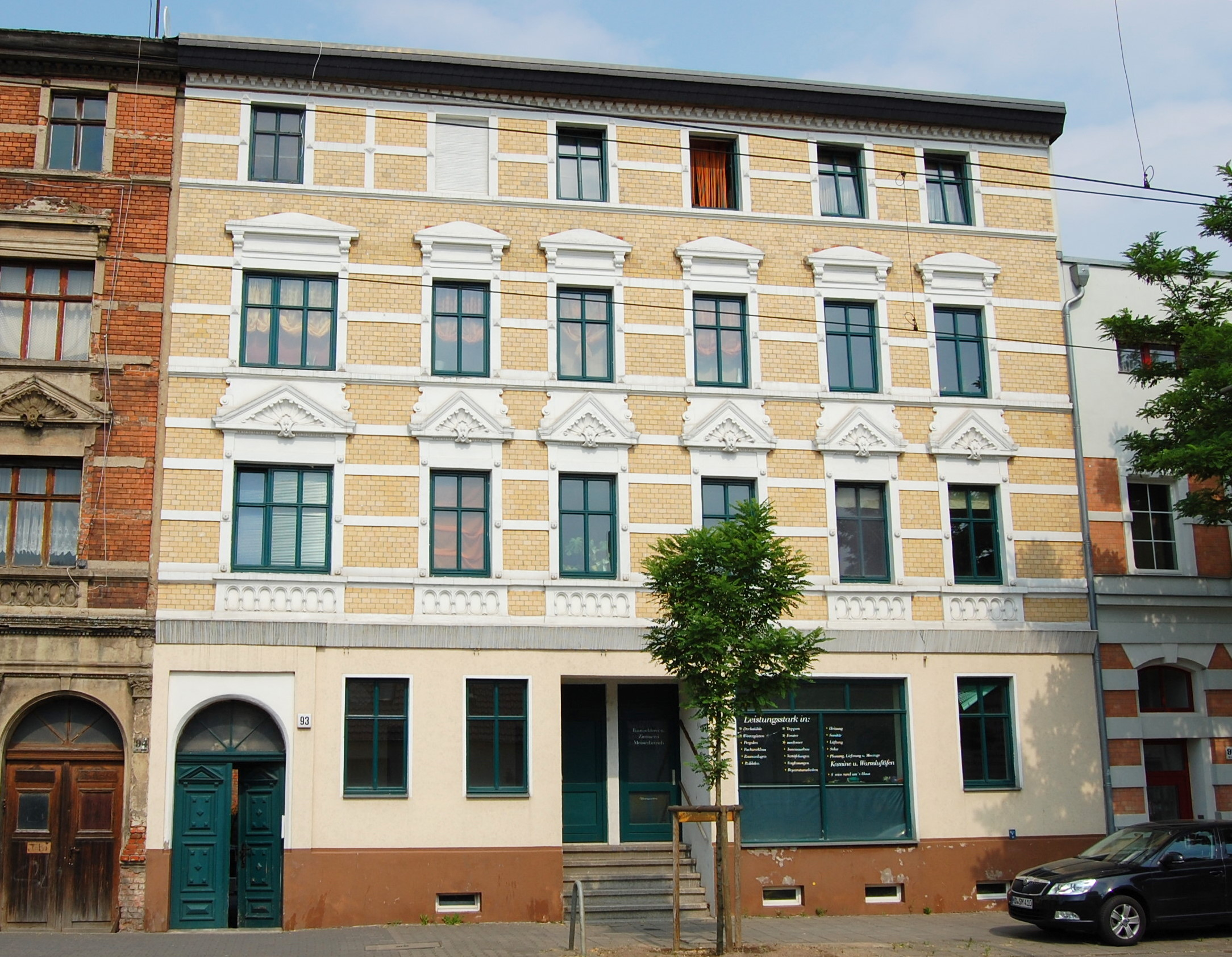
Alt Salbke 93, Karl Artelt found temporary accommodation at a friend's flat here, photo 2010

Artelt went back to Magdeburg and stayed temporarily in Alt-Salbke 93 at a friends flat. There he joined founding members of the KPD in mid February 1919 and was elected into the workers' council in March the same year. He was involved in the fighting for a council republic and against the Freikorps Märcker. He gave a speech from the balcony of a Government building in the Dome square, addressing the workers on strike. After the fighting ceased he went into hiding - first under an assumed name - in Nebra.

As secretary of the KPD in Merseburg/Querfurt, he organised the struggle to counter the Kapp-Lüttwitz-Putsch in 1920. A year later he took part in the March fighting in 1921 in Central Germany. He was imprisoned and then released on 22 August 1921 from Naumburg jail.

As party secretary in Düsseldorf-Mörs, he was apprehended by the Belgian occupation authority and tried before an extraordinary court martial in Aachen, because of political agitation against the occupation. He was put into the detention camp at Rheindahlen near Mönchengladbach. He was then extradited by the Allied commission to the Supreme Imperial Attorney.

During the following years he functioned as district secretary of the German Communist Party in Bielefeld and Kassel.

In 1924 aged 34, he became chairman of the works' council of the Schneider company in Nebra. The firm was closed down after salary demands were justified by the social courts of Naumburg, Jena and Berlin. When the company was re-established, the workers' representatives were not re-employed.

== The Nazi era ==
In the mid 1920s he became a sales agent. He subsequently started his own small business and worked until the end of 1943 as an independent trader in Nebra.

Artelt was apprehended in 1933 and was supposed to be imprisoned. However, when the officer in charge recognised him as a former navy comrade, he refrained from doing so. Artelt nevertheless had to report to the police daily at noon and he was not allowed to leave Nebra. Every now and then he was apprehended and questioned but released afterwards. At the end of 1943 he had to carry out military service at the Lützkendorf mineral oil company. He was also put under Gestapo surveillance.

== After 1945 ==
After the end of the Second World War, Artelt became an initiator for the KPD and SPD merger into the SED in the Querfurt district. He became 1st district secretary.

From 1948 to 1949 he was district chairman and thereafter became first district secretary of the peoples congress, which was later renamed the National Front.

In November 1948 Artelt held speeches with the consent of the Soviet and British occupational authorities at seven large rallies in Kiel and its surroundings. This was to commemorate the 30th anniversary of the sailors' mutiny in Kiel.

In the 1960s and 70s he became highly decorated and he gave lectures in factories, schools and so on, about his revolutionary past in Kiel and other parts of Germany.

From the middle of 1980 until his death on 28 September 1981 he lived in the "Clara Zetkin" old people's home in Halle/Saale. In June 2012 the gravesite at the cemetery in Nebra was declared an honorary grave by decision of the municipal council.

== Publications ==
- Lothar Popp assisted by Karl Artelt: Ursprung und Entwicklung der November-Revolution 1918. Wie die deutsche Republik entstand (Beginning and development of the November revolution 1918. How the German republic was established), Behrens, Kiel 1919, Reprint als Sonderveröffentlichung 15 der Gesellschaft für Kieler Stadtgeschichte, Kiel 1983

== Additional literature ==
- Karl Artelt (junior); in the Magdeburger Biographisches Lexikon, Magdeburg 2002, ISBN 3-933046-49-1
- Festschrift zum 40. Jahrestag der Novemberrevolution, hg. von der SED-Bezirksleitung Magdeburg
- Im Feuer geboren. Zum Kampf der KPD im Bezirk Magdeburg-Anhalt (Beiträge zur Geschichte der Stadt und des Bezirkes Magdeburg. Hg. von der SED-Bezirksleitung Magdeburg 1978)
- Quellensammlung zur Geschichte der Arbeiterbewegung im Bezirk Magdeburg. Teil II 1917–45
- Erinnerungsbericht Karl Artelts SAPMO-Bundesarchiv (Recollection report by Karl Artelt, German Federal archive), Sign.: SGY 30/0022

== See also ==
- German Revolution
