= Lothar Popp =

German politician (1887–1980)

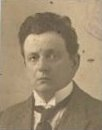
- Passport photo Lothar Popp from the Archives of the Free and Hanseatic City of Hamburg, probably from the mid-1920s.
- Born: 7 February 1887
- Died: 27 April 1980 (aged 93)
- Military career
- Allegiance: German Empire
- Branch: Imperial German Navy
- Conflicts: First World War

Lothar Popp (7 February 1887 – 27 April 1980) was a German revolutionary and a leader of the sailors' revolt in Kiel in 1918.

== Education and party membership ==
Lothar Popp was born 7 February 1887 in the small German town Furth im Wald as son of a lower public servant (royal Bavarian station master); he was Catholic by denomination but left church later. He attended public school and did an apprenticeship as shop assistant in Augsburg. At the age of sixteen he ran away from home. First he went to Leipzig, where he tried to make ends meet by selling shoe strings. From 1904 until 1914 he was a worker and merchant in Hamburg. His father died early and he got his mother to join him in Hamburg.

In the year 1906 he became a member of the Monistenbund (an association of libertines) and 1912 he joined the SPD. By that time he had come to know that August Bebel and Wilhelm Liebknecht did not approve of the loans for the war in 1870/71.

== First World War and stay in Kiel ==
When on 4 August 1914 the SPD parliamentary faction approved of the war loans for the First World War, Popp joined the German Peace Society (Deutsche Friedensgesellschaft).

After the death of his mother in 1916 he moved to Kiel, where he was able to take over three cigarette shops. According to Otto Preßler he operated a "Bonbon-Laden" (sweets shop) in the Holstenstrasse and another one in the Elisabethstrasse. According to Gertrud Voelcker he had a sweets sale, whereby the sweets were manufactured in Bordesholm (nearby Kiel) by a sympathiser.

In 1915 he became a private for twenty months; in early 1917 he was dismissed as unfit for service to Kiel, to become a mobilised fitter working at the Germania ship yard. At first he was active for the SPD. Amongst others he took part in a strike in March 1917 although he had not yet a leading role. He lived near the Wilhelmplatz in the Ringstrasse.

Popp founded in Kiel with about one thousand men the "Sozialdemokratischer Verein Gross Kiel — alte Richtung" (Social-democratic Association Kiel and Outskirts — Old Direction), a local organisation which existed only in Kiel. Chairman was W. Sens, who had an artificial leg and could not be recruited. Other chairpersons were besides Popp: Palavizini and Güth. Later the association joined the USPD (Independent SPD). Chairman of the USPD region Wasserkante (water edge) was a member of the Reichstag from Bremen Alfred Henke.

During the January strike 1918 in Kiel, at a large rally he founded the first Arbeiterrat (workers' council). He was proposed as chairman and elected per acclamation. After the first meeting of the council one or two days later he was apprehended and sentenced to two months in prison for conducting an illicit meeting, which he had to serve in Neumuenster. After being released from prison the ship yard did not allow him to continue working there. The USPD shop stewarts tried several days until they managed to find work for him at Gebrueder Genimb-Motorenwerke. There he worked for nine days and then reported sick. Until the revolution started he did not go back, which he could do because he was financially secured.

In November 1918 he and Karl Artelt led the marines' mutiny in Kiel, which triggered the German Revolution of 1918–1919. Popp took part in negotiations between sailors, SPD and USPD party delegates and navy admirals especially Wilhelm Souchon. After Karl Artelt had spoken as a representative of the soldiers' councils, Popp presented comprehensive minimum demands to the military and political leadership: abolishment of the crown, abolition of all German monarchies, a free people's republic, a just election legislation, freedom of the press and complete release of all political prisoners.

Popp ensured that the initially spontaneously formed, unstructured soldiers' councils had a solid base through elections in all units, and the establishment of the Supreme Soldiers' Council (Oberster Soldatenrat, OSR) on 6 and 7 November. Popp was elected chairman of the OSR. He was succeeded by Karl Artelt on 10 December. He remained, however, a political advisor in the OSR. This, however, probably only pro forma, because he emphasized in later interviews that he had not cared about the Soldiers' Council since the decision for the National Assembly had been made.

The effects of his then work he evaluated 1978 in retrospect as follows: "We were not revolutionaries, because we did not fight for a cause but we wanted to terminate a crazy thing. When we suddenly held the power, I wanted to make something out of the collapse of the Kaiserreich. In some votings I could beat Noske, who had come to strangle everything, but during practical work my group became inferior. We became tired. The revolutionaries did not want the revolution, they wanted the constituent national assembly in Berlin." Lothar Popp views this shift of political responsibility from the workers' and soldiers' councils to the national assembly, which — as he concedes was approved by the workers and soldiers — as "the first step into the collapse of the Weimar Republic".

Popp went back to Hamburg in the beginning of 1919. He became a street hawker and a carny at the Hamburger DOM and he founded the association of the ambulant tradespersons and the carnies. He rejoined the SPD at the unification party congress in Halle (1922). He was a member of the Hamburg Parliament 1924–1931 and attempted unsuccessfully to become a member of the Reichstag.

== Nazi period ==
In 1931–32, he moved to Danzig (now Gdansk), where he sold toys and self-manufactured cleaning powder.

When in 1933 the situation became more and more critical, he went to Prag in the Czech Republic. When the Nazis marched in, he went by train via Linz and Switzerland to Paris. When France was occupied by the Nazis, he fled to Marseille. He was expatriated by the Nazis; however, his name does not appear in the expatriation lists. Instead an Ernst Ferdinand Popp is mentioned, who is probably one of his six sons. In 1941, he sailed to Martinique on board the Winnipeg. The Winnipeg had brought on two tours fighters for the Spanish republic to South America; a planned third tour could not take place because the Northern coast was blocked. Then Eleanor Roosevelt's organisation used the ship to help people escape from the Nazis. Popp managed to get on board one day before sailing, because he knew one of the sailors. Breitscheid and Everding were arrested, before they could get on board and later were handed over to the Nazis. The Winnipeg however did not make it to Martinique but was seized by a British ship and rerouted to Trinidad. "Once again the emigrants were placed behind barbed wire". After some time, those who possessed US visas were allowed to proceed. Popp went to New York. In the New York passenger lists, 1820–1957 the following entry was made: Lothar Popp, 54 years, single, merchant, born in Furth, Germany, visa issued in Marseille, France, last permanent residence: France, Marseille arrives at 6 June 1941 on board the S.S. Evangeline from Trinidad.BWI. in New York (accessible via ancestry.de). He was received by Max Brauer, Herbert Weichmann and Rudolf Katz and could stay temporarily in a house rented by SPD emigrants.

Popp became a US citizen and started the business "Lothar Popp Import and Export, Manufacturer of Educational Toys Microscopes and Musical Instruments, 446 East Str. 84th Street New York". Additionally, he established together with Richard Kramer the small shop "ELK Company" at 240 East 86th Street in New York, where they manufactured and sold sweets, especially marzipan.

He wrote articles for the Neue Volkszeitung (New Peoples Newspaper), which was published in the USA.

== After WW II ==
In 1949–50 he came back to Germany, but stayed only for some months, because he wanted to keep his American citizenship. Thereafter he came back often to stay for some months, the family also visited him in the States until he finally settled in Hamburg again. Meanwhile, legislation was changed so he could do so without losing his American citizenship. He kept his American citizenship until he died.

He became honorary chairman of the association of ambulant tradespersons and carnies. His son, Werner Popp after the second world war became chairman for some time. Ernst Harberger, Lothar Popp's half brother became after second world war chairman of the professional work group for the ambulant tradespersons until he died. Harberger himself ran a fruit stall in front of the Klosterburg opposite the main station.

After the death of his first wife Anna he married again in 1957 and ran a cafe together with his new wife. He was still an active member of the SPD.

He died on 27 April 1980 in Hamburg.

== Tribute ==
Lothar Popp was interviewed for German television documentaries regarding his role during the sailors' mutiny in Kiel.

== Publications ==
- Lothar Popp unter Mitarbeit von Karl Artelt: Ursprung und Entwicklung der November-Revolution 1918. Wie die deutsche Republik entstand, Behrens, Kiel 1919, Reprint als Sonderveröffentlichung 15 der Gesellschaft für Kieler Stadtgeschichte, Kiel 1983. Im Jahr 2020 leicht gekürzt und kommentiert veröffentlicht in: IG Metall Bezirksleitung Küste (Hrsg.): Matrosenaufstand und Novemberrevolution 1918. Hamburg 2020, S. 96–115, ISBN 978-3-96488-063-5.
- Lothar Popp: Das Gesundheitsbrevier — Lange und glücklich leben durch vernünftig leben, Möven-Verlag, Hamburg 1977

== Sources and literature ==
- Klaus Kuhl: Streitgespräch mit Lothar Popp (Disputation with Lothar Popp), Sep. 1978 (PDF-Datei; 463 kB)
- Schröder, Wilhelm, Heinz: Sozialdemokratische Parlamentarier...., Droste Verl., Düsseldorf 1995. Short version available online: http://www.bioparl.de/ BIOSP - Letter P.
- Michael Hepp (Hrsg.): Die Ausbürgerung deutscher Staatsangehöriger 1933-1945 nach den im Reichsanzeiger veröffentlichten Listen (2 Bände) K. G. Säur Verlag, München 1985
- Volker Ullrich: Interview-Notizen Lothar Popp, aufbewahrt in der Forschungsstelle für Zeitgeschichte, also available as PDF
- Klaus Kuhl: Gesprächsnotizen — Lothar Fertig, Erinnerungen an meinen Vater Lothar Popp, 2009, Auszüge veröffentlicht in Kuhl, Streitgespräch
- Dirk Dähnhardt: Revolution in Kiel. Der Übergang vom Kaiserreich zur Weimarer Republik. Karl Wachholtz Verlag, Neumünster, 1978, ISBN 3-529-02636-0
- Wolfram Wette: Gustav Noske. Eine politische Biographie, 2. Auflage, Düsseldorf 1988
- Bernd Michels: Kieler Matrosenaufstand von 1918 — „Wir waren keine Revolutionäre", in „Sozialdemokrat Magazin", Heft 11/12 November /Dezember 1978
- Lisa Fittko, Escape through the Pyrenees.. Northwestern University Press, ISBN 0-8101-1803-3.
- Varian Fry, Surrender on Demand, first published by Random House, 1945. Later edition published by Johnson Books, in 1997 in conjunction with the U.S. Holocaust Museum.
- Eric Jennings: "Last Exit from Vichy France: The Martinique Escape Route and the Ambiguities of Emigration." The Journal of Modern History 74 (June 2002): 289–324

== See also ==
- German Revolution of 1918–1919
