= Wäinö Aaltonen Museum of Art =

Modern art museum in Turku, Finland

Coordinates: 60°26′42″N 22°15′37″E

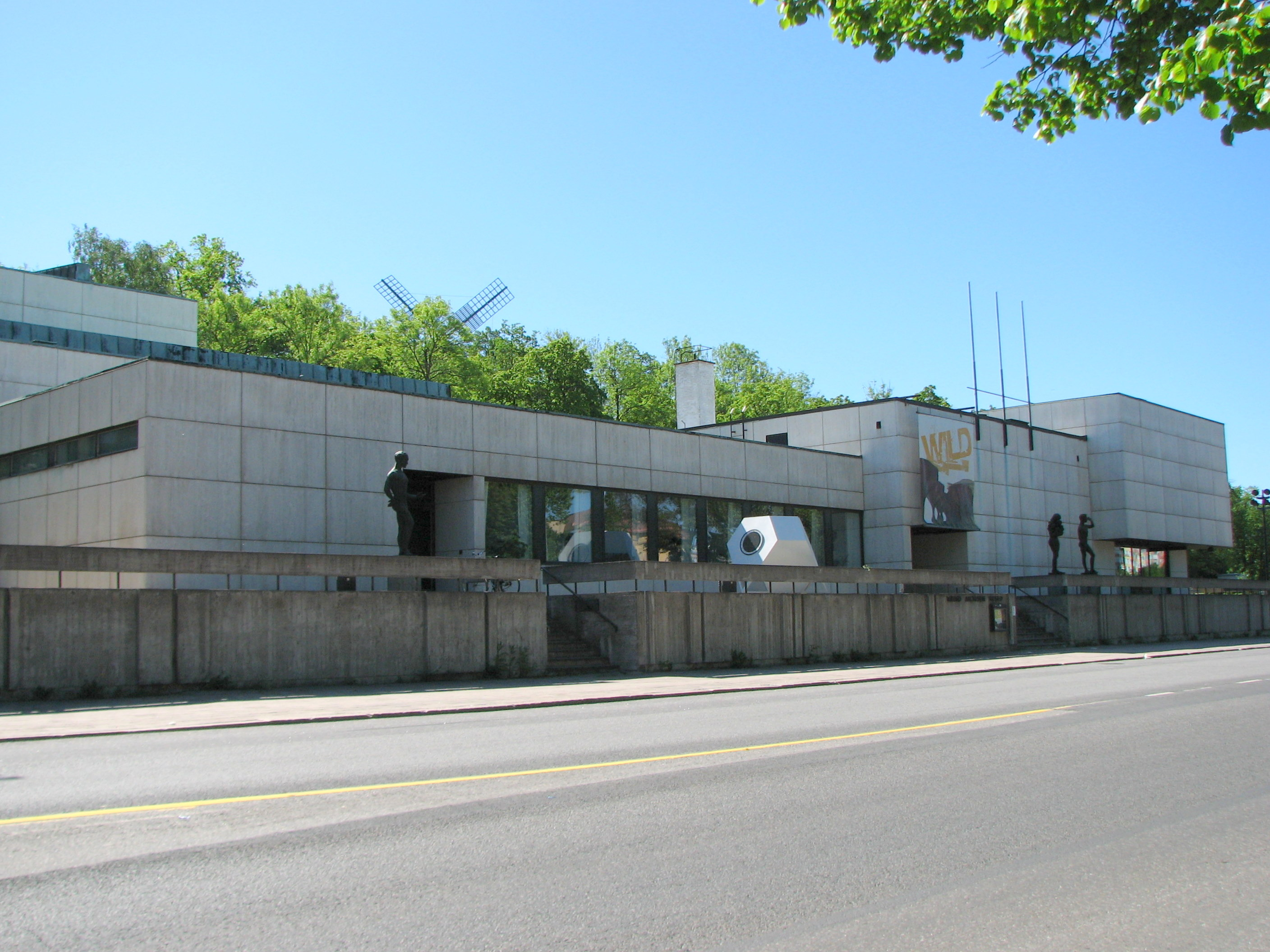
- Wäinö Aaltonen Museum of Art is located on the east bank of the Aura river.
- Established: 1967
- Location: East bank of the Aura river
- Visitors: 27,143
- Director: Olli Immonen
- Website: Official website

Wäinö Aaltonen Museum of Art (Finnish: Wäinö Aaltosen museo, Swedish: Wäinö Aaltonens museum) or WAM for short, is an art museum in central Turku, Finland dedicated especially to modern art. The museum is located on the east bank of the Aura River. The permanent exhibition is based on the art collection of the City of Turku, which includes a large collection of works by Finnish artist and sculptor Wäinö Aaltonen. Temporary exhibitions focus on Finnish and international modern art.

== Museum building ==
In March 1964, the City Council of Turku approved the proposal to establish a museum dedicated to Wäinö Aaltonen, and Aaltonen himself signed an agreement donating a basic collection to the proposed museum. Construction started in October 1965. The drawings for the modernist building were made by Wäinö Aaltonen's son, Matti Aaltonen, and his wife, Irma Aaltonen, and Wäinö also played an active part in the planning. The museum was officially opened on 17 September 1967.

The exhibition rooms of WAM have been designed to meet modern requirements. The architecture of the rooms is clean and well-lit with wide windows and numerous skylights. Inside the museum there is also a cafeteria and a shop.

== Collection ==
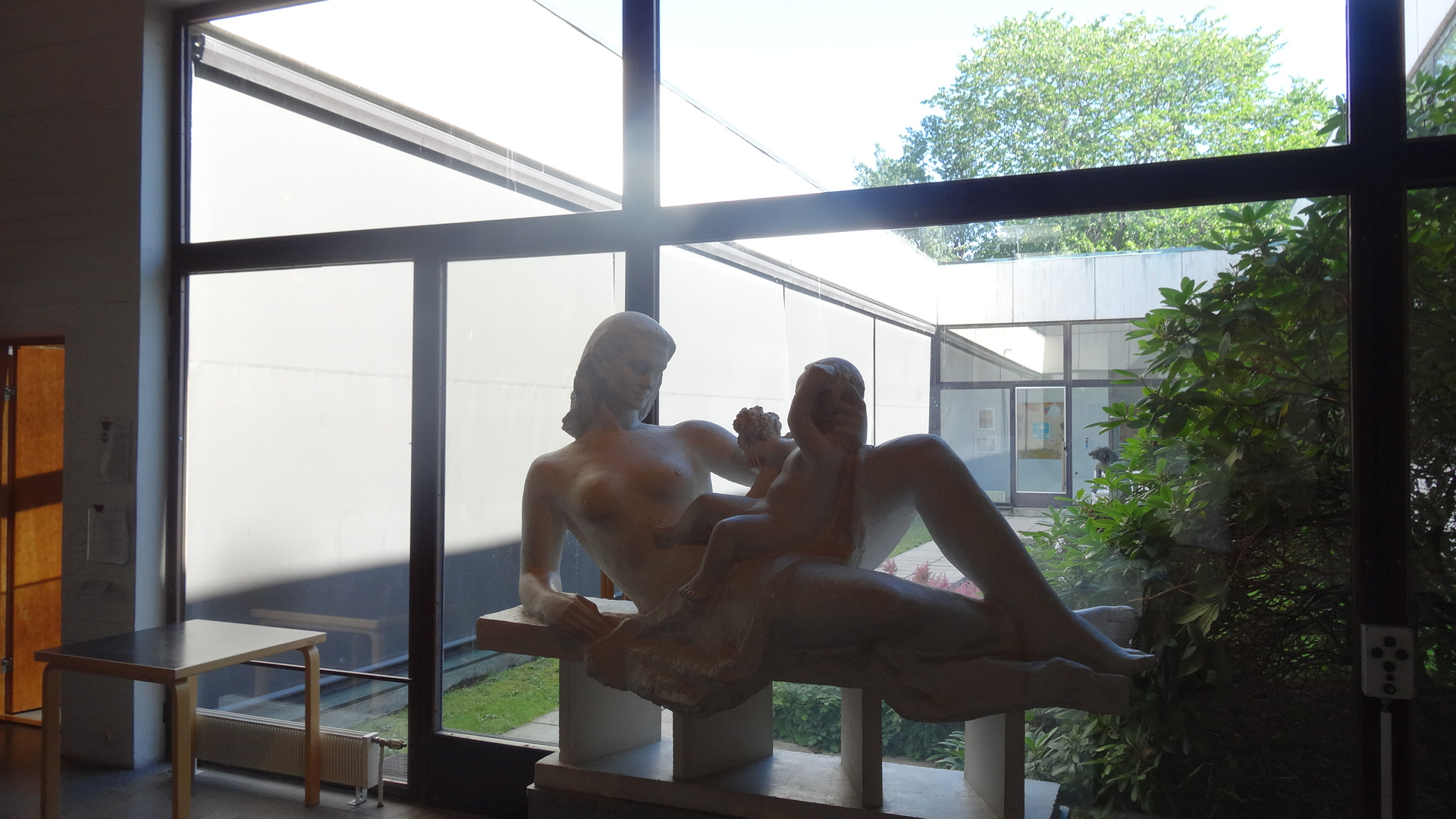
A sculpture on display in the museum

The permanent exhibition of WAM is based on the art collection of the City of Turku, which includes a large collection of works by Finnish artist and sculptor Wäinö Aaltonen. This collection is supplemented by acquisitions purchased with an annual grant. The number of acquisitions varies but, during the 21st century, approximately 60 new works of art have been acquired annually. The art is purchased from exhibitions, directly from artists, and sometimes from private collectors as well. On some special occasions, commission art is acquired from artists or artist groups by using the collection's investment funds. The focuses of the collection are on the art of the Turku area, the art of Wäinö Aaltonen, and on three-dimensional art.

Art acquisitions and donations are decided on by the Museum Director and the Curator responsible for the collection with approval by the Cultural Board.

== See also ==
- Turku
- Wäinö Aaltonen
- Aboa Vetus & Ars Nova
