= Wittelsbach (disambiguation) =

House of Wittelsbach is a former German dynasty.

Wittelsbach may also refer to:

- Wittelsbach-class battleship
- SMS Wittelsbach
- Burg Wittelsbach, a castle near Aichach, Germany
- 90712 Wittelsbach
