= SMS Mecklenburg =

Battleship of the German Imperial Navy

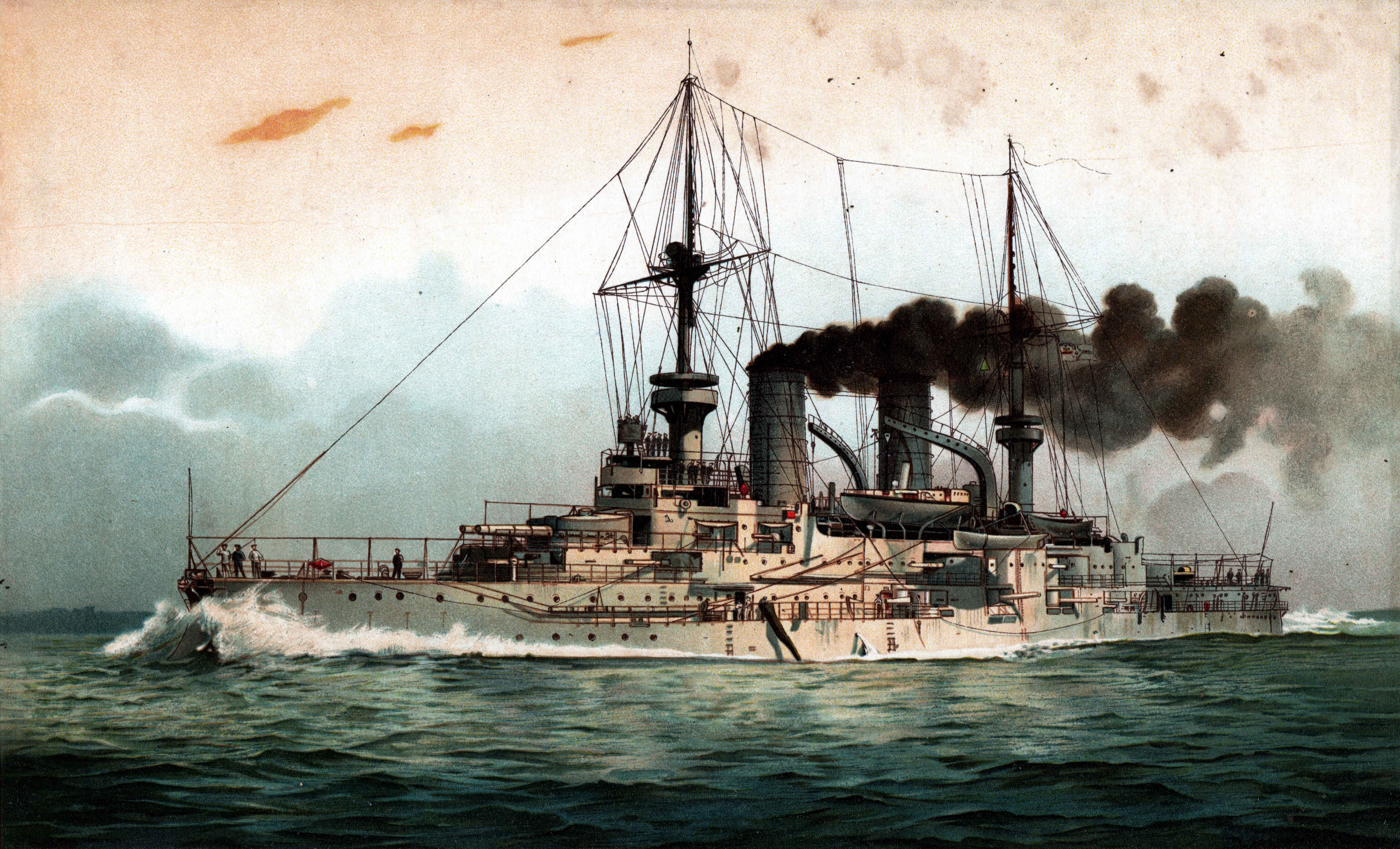
- Lithograph of Mecklenburg from 1902

History

German Empire
- Name: Mecklenburg
- Namesake: House of Mecklenburg
- Builder: AG Vulcan Stettin
- Laid down: 15 May 1900
- Launched: 9 November 1901
- Commissioned: 25 June 1903
- Decommissioned: 24 January 1916
- Stricken: 25 January 1920
- Fate: Scrapped in 1921

General characteristics
- Class & type: Wittelsbach-class battleship
- Displacement: Normal: 11,774 t (11,588 long tons); Full-load displacement: 12,798 t (12,596 long tons)
- Length: 126.8 m (416 ft) (loa)
- Beam: 22.8 m (74 ft 10 in)
- Draft: 7.95 m (26 ft 1 in)
- Installed power: 14,000 PS (13,808 ihp; 10,297 kW); 12 × water-tube boilers
- Propulsion: 3 × triple-expansion steam engines; 3 × screw propellers
- Speed: 18 knots (33 km/h; 21 mph)
- Range: 5,000 nautical miles (9,300 km; 5,800 mi); 10 knots (19 km/h; 12 mph)
- Complement: 33 officers; 650 enlisted men
- Armament: 4 × 24 cm (9.4 in) guns (40 cal.); 18 × 15 cm (5.9 in) SK L/40 guns; 12 × 8.8 cm (3.5 in) SK L/30 guns; 12 × 3.7 cm (1.5 in) machine cannon; 6 × 45 cm (17.7 in) torpedo tubes
- Armor: Belt: 100 to 225 mm (3.9 to 8.9 in); Turrets: 250 mm (9.8 in); Deck: 50 mm (2 in)

SMS Mecklenburg ("His Majesty's Ship Mecklenburg") (Note: "SMS" stands for "Seiner Majestät Schiff" (German: His Majesty's Ship).) was the fifth ship of the Wittelsbach class of pre-dreadnought battleships of the German Imperial Navy. Laid down in May 1900 at the AG Vulcan shipyard in Stettin, Germany (now Szczecin, Poland), she was finished in May 1903. Her sister ships were Wittelsbach, Zähringen, Wettin, and Schwaben; they were the first capital ships built under the Navy Law of 1898, championed by Admiral Alfred von Tirpitz. Mecklenburg was armed with a main battery of four 24-centimeter (9.4 in) guns and had a top speed of 18 knots (33 km/h; 21 mph).

Mecklenburg spent the early period of her career in I Squadron of the German fleet, participating in the peacetime routine of training cruises and exercises. After World War I began in August 1914, the ship was mobilized with her sisters as IV Battle Squadron. She saw limited duty in the Baltic Sea against Russian naval forces, and as a guard ship in the North Sea. The German High Command withdrew the ship from active service in January 1916 due to a threat from submarines and naval mines, together with severe shortages in personnel. For the remainder of her career, Mecklenburg served as a prison ship and as a barracks ship based in Kiel. She was stricken from the navy list in January 1920 and sold for scrapping the following year.

== Design ==
After the German Kaiserliche Marine (Imperial Navy) ordered the four Brandenburg-class battleships in 1889, a combination of budgetary constraints, opposition in the Reichstag (Imperial Diet), and a lack of a coherent fleet plan delayed the acquisition of further battleships. The Secretary of the Reichsmarineamt (Imperial Navy Office), Vizeadmiral (VAdm—Vice Admiral) Friedrich von Hollmann struggled throughout the early and mid-1890s to secure parliamentary approval for the first three Kaiser Friedrich III-class battleships. In June 1897, Hollmann was replaced by Konteradmiral (KAdm—Rear Admiral) Alfred von Tirpitz, who quickly proposed and secured approval for the first Naval Law in early 1898. The law authorized the last two ships of the class, as well as the five ships of the Wittelsbach class, the first class of battleship built under Tirpitz's tenure. The Wittelsbachs were broadly similar to the Kaiser Friedrichs, carrying the same armament but with a more comprehensive armor layout.

=== Characteristics ===
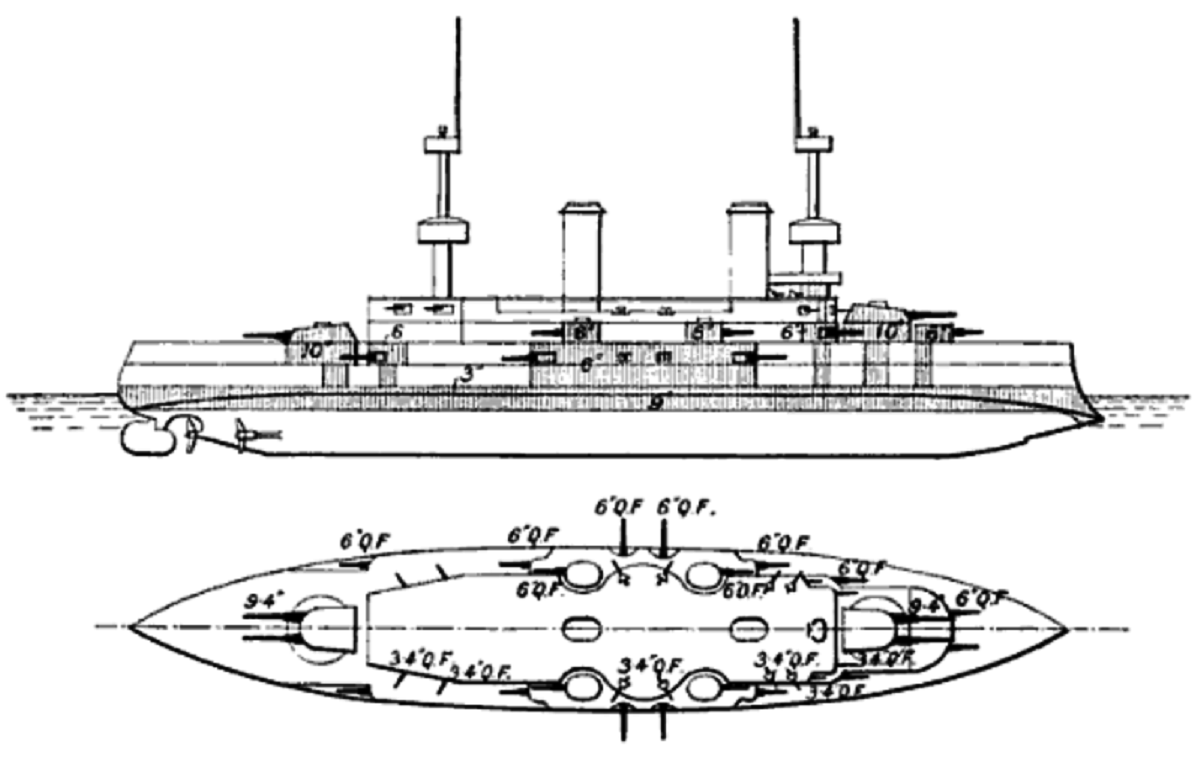
Plan and profile drawing of the Wittelsbach class

Mecklenburg was 126.80 m (416 ft) long overall; she had a beam of 22.80 m (74 ft 10 in) and a draft of 7.95 m (26 ft 1 in) forward. She displaced 11,774 t (11,588 long tons) as designed and up to 12,798 t (12,596 long tons) at full load. The ship had a large superstructure that included an armored conning tower forward, along with a flush deck. Her hull featured a pronounced ram bow. She had a crew of 30 officers and 650 enlisted men.

The ship was powered by three 3-cylinder vertical triple-expansion engines that drove three screws. Steam was provided by six coal-fired Thornycroft boilers and six coal-fired cylindrical boilers, which were vented through a pair of large funnels located amidships. Mecklenburg's powerplant was rated at 14,000 metric horsepower (13,808 ihp; 10,297 kW), which gave her a top speed of 18 knots (33 km/h; 21 mph). The ship had a cruising radius of 5,000 nautical miles (9,300 km; 5,800 mi) at a speed of 10 knots (19 km/h; 12 mph).

The ship's primary armament consisted of a main battery of four 24 cm (9.4 in) SK L/40 guns in twin gun turrets, (Note: In Imperial German Navy gun nomenclature, "SK" (Schnelladekanone) denotes that the gun is quick firing, while the L/40 denotes the length of the gun. In this case, the L/40 gun is 40 caliber, meaning that the gun is 40 times as long as it is in diameter.) one fore and one aft of the central superstructure. Her secondary armament consisted of eighteen 15 cm (5.9 inch) SK L/40 guns that were mounted in casemates. Six of these were placed in the hull and the other six were in the superstructure, two of which were forward-firing under the forward turret. Close-range defense against torpedo boats was provided by a tertiary battery of twelve 8.8 cm (3.45 in) SK L/30 quick-firing guns and twelve 3.7 cm (1.5 in) machine cannon in the upper superstructure. Her weaponry was rounded out with six 45 cm (17.7 in) torpedo tubes, all submerged in the hull; one was in the bow, one in the stern, and the other four on the broadside.

Her armor belt was 225 millimeters (8.9 in) thick in the central citadel that protected her magazines and machinery spaces and reduced to 100 mm (3.9 in) on either end of the hull. Horizontal protection was provided by an armor deck that was 50 mm (2 in) thick; it sloped down at the sides and connected to the bottom edge of the belt. The sloped sides increased in thickness to 75–120 mm (3.0–4.7 in). The main battery turrets had 250 mm (9.8 in) of armor plating on their faces and the secondary casemates received 140 mm (5.5 in) of armor plate. Her conning tower was protected with 250 mm of armor.

== Service history ==
=== Pre-war career ===
Mecklenburg underway

Mecklenburg's keel was laid down on 15 May 1900 at AG Vulcan in Stettin, under construction number 248. She was ordered under the contract name "F", as a new unit for the fleet. (Note: German warships were ordered under provisional names. Additions to the fleet were given a single letter; ships intended to replace older or lost vessels were ordered as "Ersatz (name of the ship to be replaced)".) Mecklenburg, the last ship of her class, was launched on 9 November 1901; the ceremony was attended by Frederick Francis IV, Grand Duke of Mecklenburg-Schwerin. Fitting-out work proceeded faster on Mecklenburg than on her sister Schwaben, and so the former was commissioned on 25 June 1903, a full year before Schwaben. Mecklenburg cost 22,329,000 marks.

Immediately following her commissioning, Mecklenburg began sea trials, which lasted until mid-December 1903. She was assigned to II Division of I Squadron, alongside the battleships Kaiser Karl der Grosse and Kaiser Wilhelm II. Mecklenburg had to enter the drydock at Kaiserliche Werft (Imperial Shipyard) at Wilhelmshaven for minor improvements and repairs following her trials; this work lasted until the end of February 1904. After these modifications, Mecklenburg took part in individual and squadron training exercises, and a fleet review for the visiting British King Edward VII in June. The following month, the German fleet went on a cruise to Britain, the Netherlands, and Norway that lasted until August. Mecklenburg then participated in the annual autumn fleet exercises, which took place in late August and September, and a winter training cruise in November and December.

Starting in mid-December 1904, Mecklenburg went into Wilhelmshaven for periodic maintenance, which lasted until the beginning of March 1905. After emerging from drydock, Mecklenburg joined her sister ship Wittelsbach on a cruise through the Skagerrak to Kiel. While steaming through the Great Belt on 3 March, Mecklenburg struck the Hatter Reef off Samsø, Denmark, and became stuck. Another sister ship, Wettin, and the light cruiser Ariadne were sent to assist Wittelsbach in pulling Mecklenburg free of the reef. Mecklenburg then steamed under her own power to Kiel, where dockyard workers discovered a large dent in her bottom. Repair work was completed at the Kaiserliche Werft in Wilhelmshaven by 20 April, allowing her to participate in the normal routine of training cruises and maneuvers with the fleet for the remainder of the year. During this period, the British Channel Fleet visited the German fleet while it was moored in Swinemünde. From mid-February to the end of March 1906, Mecklenburg was in the Kaiserliche Werft in Wilhelmshaven for her annual overhaul. The training routine continued without incident through 1907 but, in early April 1908, a major accident in one of Mecklenburg's broadside torpedo rooms nearly sank her. Water began to flood the ship and could only be stopped by sealing the torpedo tubes from the outside; repairs lasted until May.

Mecklenburg participated in a training cruise to the Azores in July and August 1908. She also won the Kaiser's Schießpreis (Shooting Prize) for the most accurate gunnery in her squadron, along with the battleship Lothringen. In mid-December, she returned once again to Wilhelmshaven for the yearly overhaul. The years 1909 and 1910 passed uneventfully for Mecklenburg, with the same pattern of training cruises and maneuvers as in previous years. She began her annual overhaul on 2 December 1910 and returned to service on 7 March 1911, though only briefly. On 31 July, Mecklenburg was replaced by the new dreadnought battleship Ostfriesland; Mecklenburg was then decommissioned and assigned to the Reserve Division in the North Sea. On 9 May 1912, she was transferred to the Reserve Division in the Baltic. She returned briefly to active service in 1912 from 9 to 12 May to move her from the North Sea to the Baltic, and again from 14 August to 28 September to participate in the fleet exercises that year. During the maneuvers, she served in III Squadron.

=== World War I ===
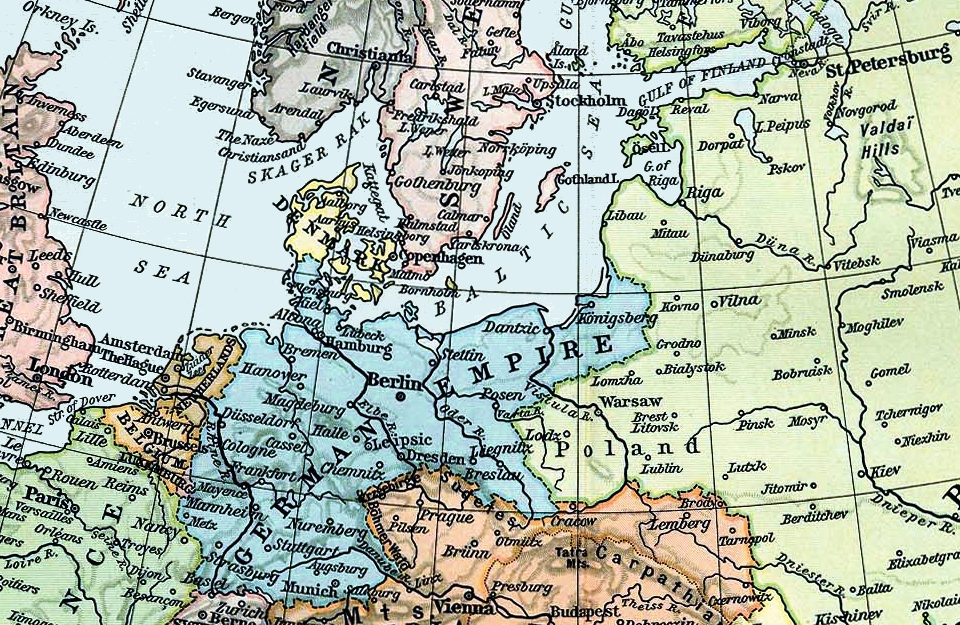
Map of the North and Baltic Seas in 1911

After the outbreak of World War I in August 1914, Mecklenburg and the rest of her class were mobilized to serve in IV Battle Squadron, under the command of Vice Admiral Ehrhard Schmidt. The squadron was initially allocated to the North Sea, but was temporarily transferred to the Baltic in September. Starting on 3 September, IV Squadron, assisted by the armored cruiser Blücher, conducted a sweep into the eastern Baltic in the direction of the Svenska Högarna islands. The operation lasted until 9 September and failed to bring Russian naval units to battle. The squadron participated in a demonstration off Windau the next day. From 5 December to 2 April 1915, Mecklenburg and the rest of the squadron were assigned to guard duty in the North Sea, based in the mouth of the Elbe.

In May 1915, IV Squadron, including Mecklenburg, was transferred to support the German Army in the Baltic Sea area. Mecklenburg and her sisters were then based in Kiel. From 8 to 12 May, she participated in a sweep toward Gotland and Bogskär, to support the assault on Libau. Mecklenburg and the other ships stood off Gotland to intercept any Russian cruisers that might try to intervene in the landings, but this did not occur. On 10 May, after the invasion force had entered Libau, the British submarines HMS E1 and HMS E9 spotted IV Squadron, but were too far away to make an attack. After the operation, Mecklenburg and the rest of IV Squadron returned to the Elbe for guard duties, which lasted until 4 July. The next day, Mecklenburg departed for Kiel in preparation for a major operation in the Baltic. She proceeded to Danzig, and on 11 July departed for a sweep to Gotska Sandön; another patrol to western Gotland followed on 21–22 July. Mecklenburg then steamed from Danzig to Libau on 2 August, where she joined another foray toward Gotska Sandön from 7 to 10 August.

Mecklenburg and her sisters were not included in the German fleet that assaulted the Gulf of Riga in August 1915, due to the scarcity of escorts. The increasingly active British submarines forced the Germans to employ more destroyers to protect the capital ships. Mecklenburg took part in two sweeps to Huvudskär on 9–11 and 21–23 September. On 17 December she ran aground in the entrance to the harbor of Libau, but was towed free without suffering any damage. She was to replace the worn-out armored cruiser Prinz Heinrich in the reconnaissance forces of the fleet in the Baltic, but Mecklenburg and her sisters were removed from service shortly thereafter. By this stage of the war, the German Navy was facing severe shortages of crews, which could be alleviated by the decommissioning of older, less effective warships. Furthermore, the increasing threat from British submarines and Russian mines in the Baltic by 1916, the latter of which sank the armored cruiser Friedrich Carl, convinced the German navy to withdraw the elderly Wittelsbach-class ships from active service. On 6 January 1916, Mecklenburg left Libau bound for Kiel, arriving the following day. She was decommissioned on 24 January and placed in reserve.

Mecklenburg was initially based in Kiel and used as a floating prison. In early 1918, she became a barracks ship for the crews of U-boats being repaired in Kiel. The ship was briefly retained after the German defeat at the end of World War I, but was to be discarded under the terms of the Treaty of Versailles, which limited the re-formed Reichsmarine to eight pre-dreadnought battleships of the Deutschland and Braunschweig classes, of which only six could be operational at any given time. (Note: Treaty of Versailles Section II: Naval Clauses, Article 181.) Accordingly, on 25 January 1920, Mecklenburg was stricken from the naval register. She was sold to Deutsche Werke, a shipbuilder based in Kiel, on 16 August 1921 for 1,750,000 Marks, and was broken up for scrap metal that year at Kiel-Nordmole.
