= SMS Wittelsbach =

Battleship of the German Imperial Navy

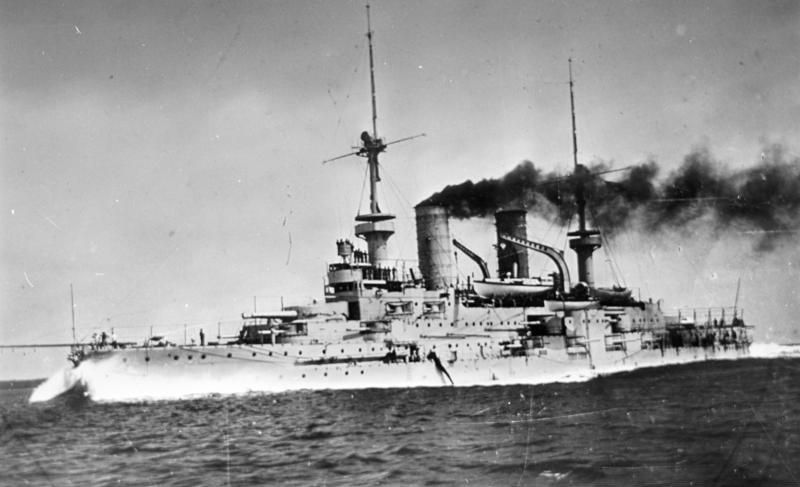
- SMS Wittelsbach

History

Germany
- Name: Wittelsbach
- Namesake: House of Wittelsbach
- Builder: Kaiserliche Werft Wilhelmshaven
- Laid down: 30 September 1899
- Launched: 3 July 1900
- Commissioned: 15 October 1902
- Recommissioned: 1 June 1919
- Decommissioned: 24 August 1916
- Stricken: 8 March 1921
- Fate: Sold for scrap, 7 July 1921

General characteristics
- Class & type: Wittelsbach-class battleship
- Displacement: Normal: 11,774 t (11,588 long tons); Full-load displacement: 12,798 t (12,596 long tons)
- Length: 126.8 m (416 ft) (loa)
- Beam: 22.8 m (74 ft 10 in)
- Draft: 7.95 m (26 ft 1 in)
- Installed power: 14,000 PS (13,810 ihp; 10,300 kW); 6 × water-tube boilers; 6 × cylindrical boilers
- Propulsion: 3 × triple-expansion steam engines; 3 × screw propellers
- Speed: 18 knots (33 km/h; 21 mph)
- Range: 5,000 nautical miles (9,300 km; 5,800 mi); 10 knots (19 km/h; 12 mph)
- Complement: 33 officers; 650 enlisted men
- Armament: 4 × 24 cm (9.4 in) guns (40 cal.); 18 × 15 cm (5.9 in) SK L/40 guns; 12 × 8.8 cm (3.5 in) SK L/30 guns; 12 × 3.7 cm (1.5 in) machine cannon; 6 × 45 cm (17.7 in) torpedo tubes
- Armor: Belt: 100 to 225 mm (3.9 to 8.9 in); Turrets: 250 mm (9.8 in); Deck: 50 mm (2 in)

SMS Wittelsbach (Note: (German: Seiner Majestät Schiff Wittelsbach; English: His Majesty's Ship Wittelsbach)) was the lead ship of the Wittelsbach class of pre-dreadnought battleships, built for the Imperial German Navy. She was the first capital ship built under the Navy Law of 1898, brought about by Admiral Alfred von Tirpitz. Wittelsbach was laid down in 1899 at the Wilhelmshaven Navy Dockyard and completed in October 1902. She was armed with a main battery of four 24 cm (9.4 in) guns and had a top speed of 18 knots (33 km/h; 21 mph).

The ship served in I Squadron of the German fleet for the majority of her peacetime career, which spanned from 1902 to 1910. During this period, she was occupied with extensive annual training and making good-will visits to foreign countries. The training exercises during this period provided the framework for the High Seas Fleet's operations during World War I. She was decommissioned in September 1910, but was reactivated in 1911 for training ship duties, which lasted through 1914.

After the start of World War I in August 1914, Wittelsbach was brought back to active duty in IV Battle Squadron. The ship served in the Baltic Sea, including during the Battle of the Gulf of Riga in August 1915, but saw no combat with Russian forces. By late 1915, crew shortages and the threat from British submarines forced the Kaiserliche Marine to withdraw older battleships like Wittelsbach. The ship then saw service in auxiliary roles, first as a training ship and then as a ship's tender. After the war, she was converted into a tender for minesweepers in 1919. In July 1921, the ship was sold and broken up for scrap metal.

== Design ==
After the German Kaiserliche Marine (Imperial Navy) ordered the four Brandenburg-class battleships in 1889, a combination of budgetary constraints, opposition in the Reichstag (Imperial Diet), and a lack of a coherent fleet plan delayed the acquisition of further battleships. The Secretary of the Reichsmarineamt (Imperial Navy Office), Vizeadmiral (VAdm—Vice Admiral) Friedrich von Hollmann struggled—ultimately successfully—throughout the early and mid-1890s to secure parliamentary approval for the first three Kaiser Friedrich III-class battleships. In June 1897, Hollmann was replaced by Konteradmiral (KAdm—Rear Admiral) Alfred von Tirpitz, who quickly proposed and secured approval for the first Naval Law in early 1898. The law authorized the last two ships of the class, as well as the five ships of the Wittelsbach class, the first class of battleship built under Tirpitz's tenure. The Wittelsbachs were broadly similar to the Kaiser Friedrichs, carrying the same armament but with a more comprehensive armor layout.

=== Characteristics ===
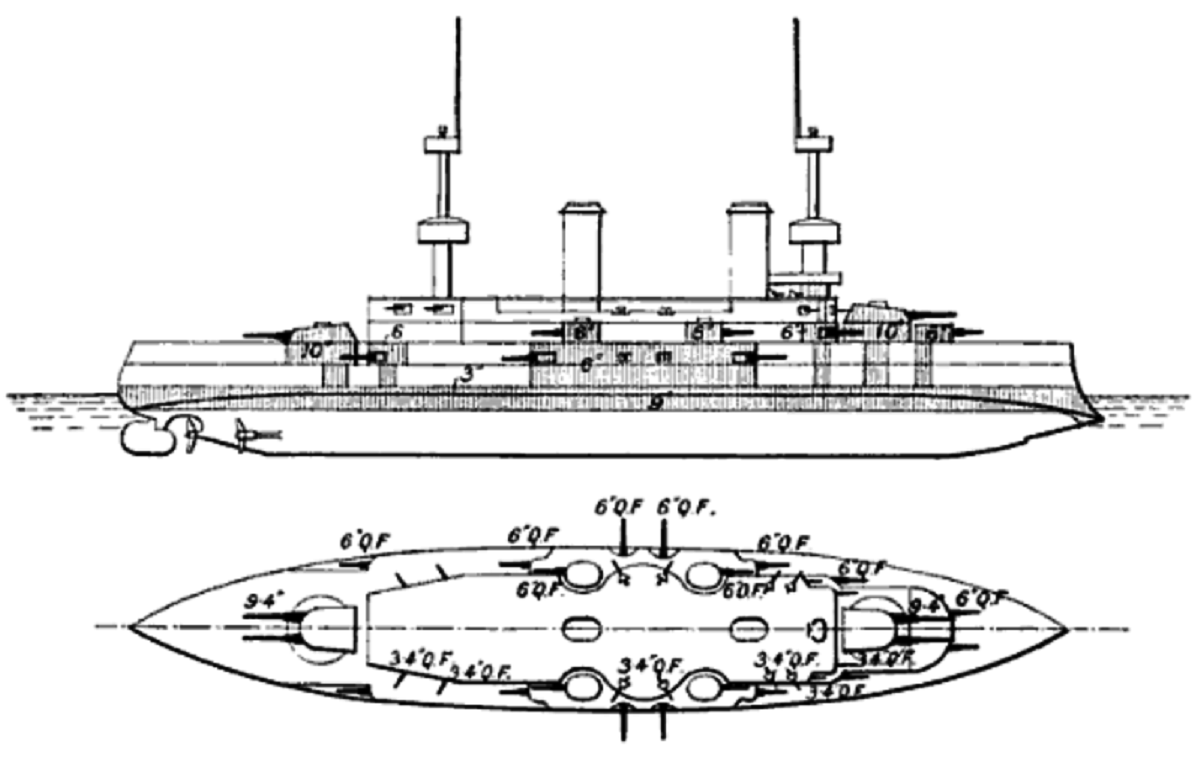
Plan and profile drawing of the Wittelsbach class

Wittelsbach was 126.8 m (416 ft) long overall and had a beam of 22.8 m (74 ft 10 in) and a draft of 7.95 m (26 ft 1 in) forward. She displaced 11,774 t (11,588 long tons) as designed and up to 12,798 t (12,596 long tons) at full load. Unlike her sister ships, Wittelsbach was completed with provisions for a squadron commander's staff, including a larger bridge. The ship had a large superstructure that included an armored conning tower forward, along with a flush deck. Her hull featured a pronounced ram bow. She had a crew of 30 officers and 650 enlisted men.

The ship was propelled by three 3-cylinder vertical triple expansion engines that drove three screws. Steam was provided by six cylindrical and six water-tube boilers, all coal-fired, which were vented through a pair of large funnels located amidships. Wittelsbach's powerplant was rated at 14,000 metric horsepower (13,808 ihp; 10,297 kW), which generated a top speed of 18 knots (33 km/h; 21 mph). The ship had a cruising radius of 5,000 nautical miles (9,300 km; 5,800 mi) at a speed of 10 knots (19 km/h; 12 mph).

Wittelsbach's armament consisted of a main battery of four 24 cm (9.4 in) SK L/40 guns in twin gun turrets, (Note: In Imperial German Navy gun nomenclature, "SK" (Schnelladekanone) denotes that the gun is quick firing, while the L/40 denotes the length of the gun. In this case, the L/40 gun is 40 caliber, meaning that the gun is 40 times as long as it is in diameter.) one fore and one aft of the central superstructure. Her secondary armament consisted of eighteen 15 cm (5.9 inch) SK L/40 guns that were mounted in casemates. Six of these were placed in the hull and the other six were in the superstructure, two of which were forward-firing under the forward turret. Close-range defense against torpedo boats was provided by a tertiary battery of twelve 8.8 cm (3.45 in) SK L/30 quick-firing guns and twelve 3.7 cm (1.5 in) machine cannon in the upper superstructure. The armament suite was rounded out with six 45 cm (17.7 in) torpedo tubes, all submerged in the hull; one was in the bow, another in the stern, and two on each broadside.

The ship was protected with Krupp armor plate. Her armor belt was 225 millimeters (8.9 in) thick in the central citadel that protected her magazines and machinery spaces and reduced to 100 mm (3.9 in) on either end of the hull. Horizontal protection was provided by an armor deck that was 50 mm (2 in) thick; it sloped down at the sides and connected to the bottom edge of the belt. The sloped sides increased in thickness to 75–120 mm (3.0–4.7 in). The main battery turrets had 250 mm (9.8 in) of armor plating on their faces and the secondary casemates received 140 mm (5.5 in) of armor plate. Her conning tower was protected with 250 mm of armor.

== Service history ==
=== Construction to 1905 ===
Wittelsbach's keel was laid down on 30 September 1899 at the Kaiserliche Werft (Imperial Shipyard) in Wilhelmshaven, listed under construction number 25. She was ordered under the contract name "C", as a new unit for the fleet. (Note: German warships were ordered under provisional names. Additions to the fleet were given a single letter; ships intended to replace older or lost vessels were ordered as "Ersatz (name of the ship to be replaced)".) Wittelsbach was launched on 3 July 1900, with Kaiser Wilhelm II in attendance; Rupprecht, Crown Prince of Bavaria, of the House of Wittelsbach, gave a speech at her launching ceremony. Completion of the ship was delayed due to a collision with the ironclad Baden, which accidentally rammed Wittelsbach in July 1902 while she was fitting out. She was commissioned on 15 October 1902, and thereafter began sea trials, which were completed in December. After trials ended, Wittelsbach was transferred from Wilhelmshaven to Kiel in the Baltic Sea, but she ran aground in the Great Belt in heavy fog on 13 December. The crew attempted to free the ship by removing stores to lighten her, and the battleship Kaiser Karl der Grosse and the armored cruiser Prinz Heinrich attempted to pull her free without success, before additional tugs and other vessels arrived to pull Wittelsbach free on 20 December. After arriving in Kiel, she entered Kaiserliche Werft for repairs.

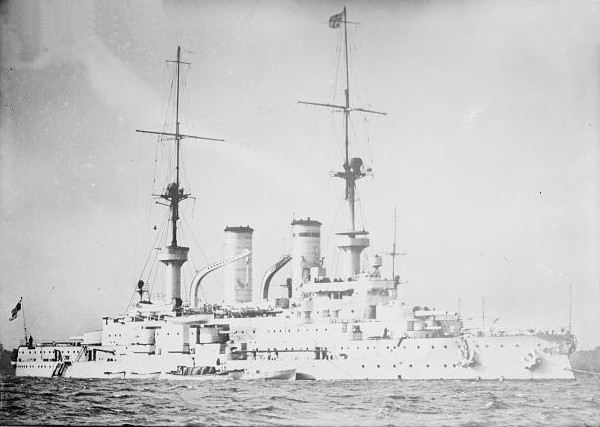
Wittelsbach sometime before 1914

On 1 March 1903, she became the flagship of KAdm Gustav Schmidt, the deputy commander of I Squadron. That year, the squadron was occupied with the normal peacetime routine of individual and unit training, including a training cruise in the Baltic, followed by a voyage to Spain that lasted from 7 May to 10 June. In July, she embarked on the annual cruise to Norway with the rest of the squadron. The autumn maneuvers consisted of a blockade exercise in the North Sea, a cruise of the entire fleet first to Norwegian waters and then to Kiel in early September, and finally a mock attack on Kiel. The exercises concluded on 12 September. The year's training schedule concluded with a cruise into the eastern Baltic that started on 23 November and a cruise into the Skagerrak that began on 1 December. Wittelsbach and I Squadron participated in an exercise in the Skagerrak from 11 to 21 January 1904. Further squadron exercises followed from 8 to 17 March, and a major fleet exercise took place in the North Sea in May. In July, I Squadron and I Scouting Group visited Britain, including a stop at Plymouth on 10 July. The German fleet departed on 13 July, bound for the Netherlands; I Squadron anchored in Vlissingen the following day. There, the ships were visited by Queen Wilhelmina. I Squadron remained in Vlissingen until 20 July, when they departed for a cruise in the northern North Sea with the rest of the fleet. The squadron stopped in Molde, Norway, on 29 July, while the other units went to other ports.

The fleet reassembled on 6 August and steamed back to Kiel, where it conducted a mock attack on the harbor on 12 August. During its cruise in the North Sea, the fleet experimented with wireless telegraphy on a large scale and searchlights at night for communication and recognition signals. Immediately after returning to Kiel, the fleet began preparations for the autumn maneuvers, which began on 29 August in the Baltic. The fleet moved to the North Sea on 3 September, where it took part in a major landing operation, after which the ships took the ground troops from IX Corps who had participated in the exercises to Altona for a parade for Wilhelm II. The ships then conducted their own parade for the Kaiser off Helgoland on 6 September. Three days later, the fleet returned to the Baltic via the Kaiser Wilhelm Canal, where it participated in further landing operations with IX Corps and the Guards Corps. On 15 September, the maneuvers came to an end. Wittelsbach became the squadron flagship on 1 October, flying the flag of KAdm Friedrich von Baudissin. I Squadron went on its winter training cruise, this time to the eastern Baltic, from 22 November to 2 December.

=== 1905–1914 ===
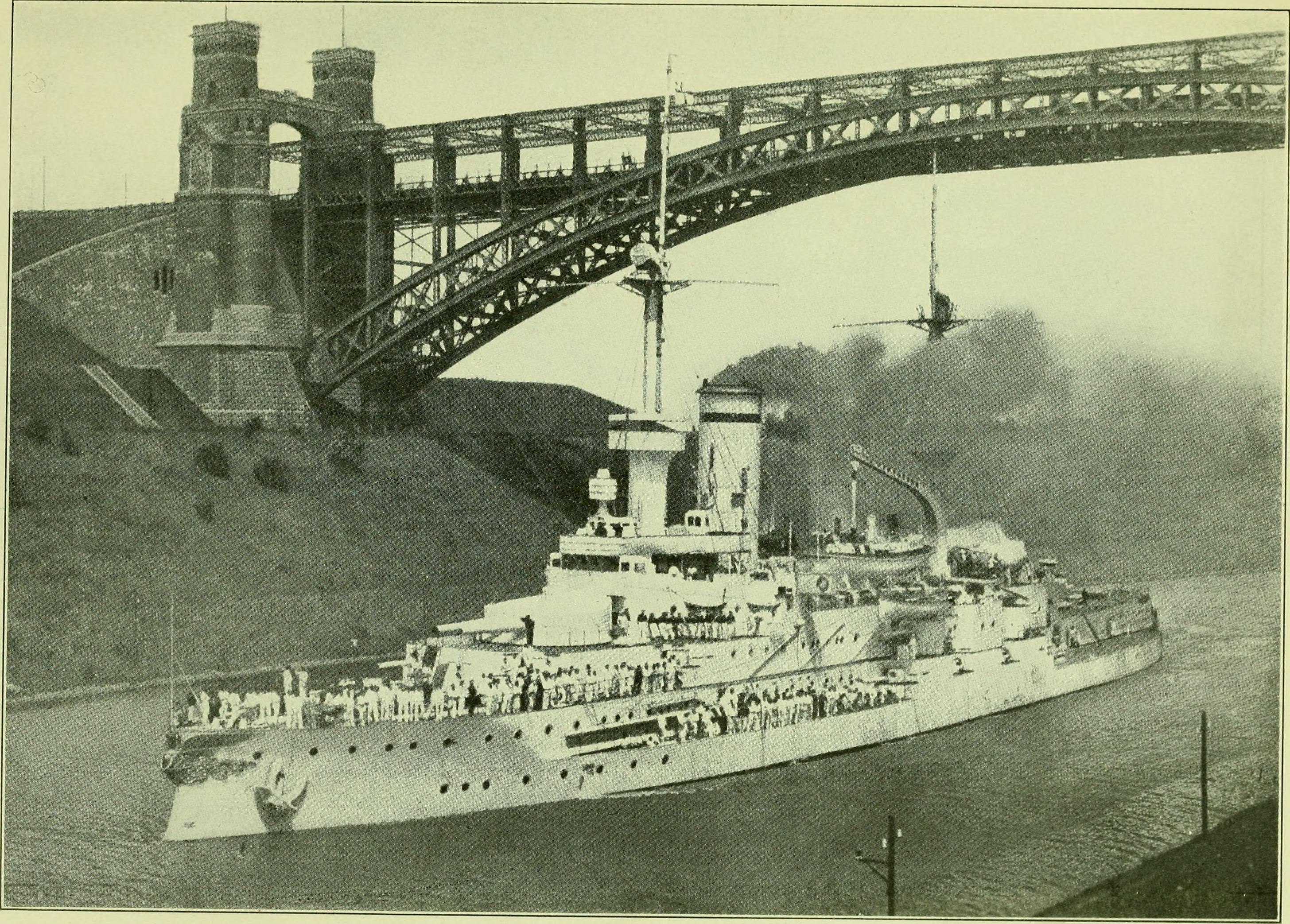
Wittelsbach passing through the Kaiser Wilhelm Canal, under the Levensau High Bridge

Wittelsbach took part in a pair of training cruises with I Squadron during 9–19 January and 27 February – 16 March 1905. Individual and squadron training followed, with an emphasis on gunnery drills. On 12 July, the fleet began a major training exercise in the North Sea. The fleet then cruised through the Kattegat and stopped in Copenhagen and Stockholm. The summer cruise ended on 9 August, though the autumn maneuvers that would normally have begun shortly thereafter were delayed by a visit from the British Channel Fleet that month. The British fleet stopped in Danzig, Swinemünde, and Flensburg, where it was greeted by units of the German Navy; Wittelsbach and the main German fleet was anchored at Swinemünde for the occasion. Politically, the visit was strained by the developing Anglo-German naval arms race. As a result of the British visit, the 1905 autumn maneuvers were shortened considerably, from 6 to 13 September, and consisted only of exercises in the North Sea. The first exercise presumed a naval blockade in the German Bight, and the second envisioned a hostile fleet attempting to force the defenses of the Elbe. In September, Kapitän zur See Maximilian von Spee, who would go on to command the East Asia Squadron at the outbreak of World War I, took command of the ship.

In October, I Squadron went on a cruise in the Baltic. In early December, I and II Squadrons went on their regular winter cruise—this time to Danzig, where they arrived on 12 December. While on the return trip to Kiel, the fleet conducted tactical exercises. The fleet undertook a heavier training schedule in 1906 than in previous years. The ships were occupied with individual, division and squadron exercises throughout April. Starting on 13 May, major fleet exercises took place in the North Sea and lasted until 8 June with a cruise around the Skagen into the Baltic. The fleet began its usual summer cruise to Norway in mid-July. The fleet was present for the birthday of Norwegian King Haakon VII on 3 August. The German ships departed the following day for Helgoland, to join exercises being conducted there. The fleet was back in Kiel by 15 August, where preparations for the autumn maneuvers began. On 22–24 August, the fleet took part in landing exercises in Eckernförde Bay outside Kiel. The maneuvers were paused from 31 August to 3 September when the fleet hosted vessels from Denmark and Sweden, along with a Russian squadron from 3 to 9 September in Kiel. The maneuvers resumed on 8 September and lasted five more days.

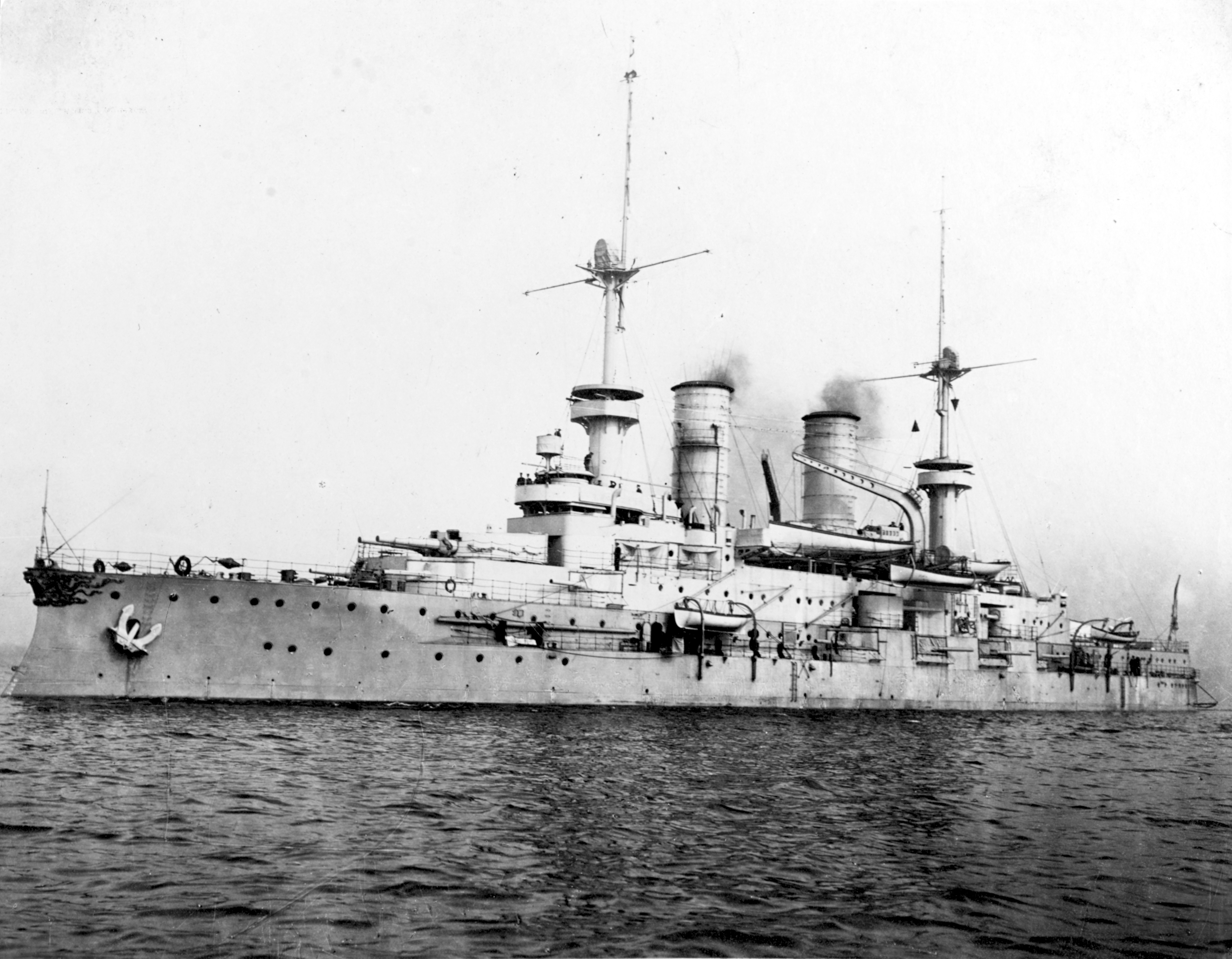
Wittelsbach c. 1910

The ship participated in the uneventful winter cruise into the Kattegat and Skagerrak from 8 to 16 December. The first quarter of 1907 followed the previous pattern and, on 16 February, the Active Battle Fleet was re-designated the High Seas Fleet. From the end of May to early June the fleet went on its summer cruise in the North Sea, returning to the Baltic via the Kattegat. This was followed by the regular cruise to Norway from 12 July to 10 August. During the autumn maneuvers, which lasted from 26 August to 6 September, the fleet conducted landing exercises in northern Schleswig with IX Corps. The winter training cruise went into the Kattegat from 22 to 30 November. In May 1908, the fleet went on a major cruise into the Atlantic instead of its normal voyage in the North Sea, which included a stop in Horta in the Azores. The fleet returned to Kiel on 13 August to prepare for the autumn maneuvers, which lasted from 27 August to 7 September. Division exercises in the Baltic immediately followed from 7 to 13 September. After the end of the maneuvers, Wittelsbach was relieved as the squadron flagship by the new battleship Hannover and became the flagship of the deputy commander.

Wittelsbach was replaced as the deputy command flagship on 20 September 1910, again by Hannover, for decommissioning. Her crew was sent to man the newly commissioned dreadnought battleship Posen. After a year in reserve, Wittelsbach was reactivated on 16 October 1911 to replace the battleship Brandenburg in the Reserve Division of the North Sea. From 31 March to 28 April 1912, she operated with the Training Squadron, and on 9 May returned to the Reserve Division, this time relieving the battleship Kaiser Wilhelm II. She took part in the annual fleet maneuvers that year as the flagship of III Squadron, then commanded by VAdm Max Rollmann. Wittelsbach returned for another stint in the Training Squadron from 30 March to 21 April 1913. Wilhelm II commissioned a statue of Frithjof that he gave to Norway; Wittelsbach was used to transport the statue, departing Kiel on 5 July and arriving in Balholmen two days later. The ship was back in Germany in time for the fleet maneuvers in August, where she was assigned to V Division of III Squadron. After the completion of the maneuvers, she returned to the Reserve Division.

=== World War I ===
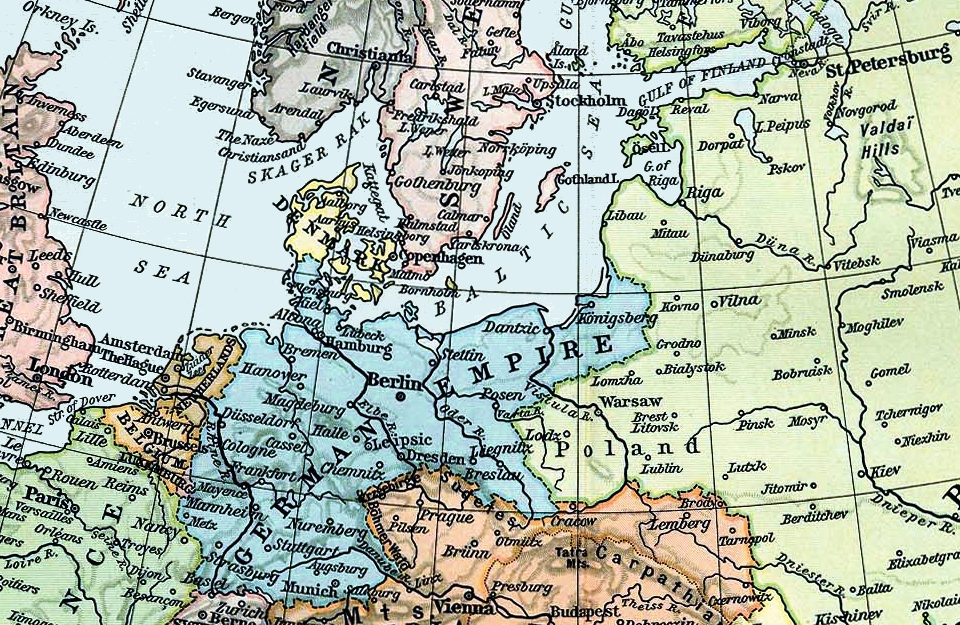
Map of the North and Baltic Seas in 1911

At the start of World War I, Wittelsbach was mobilized as part of IV Battle Squadron, under the command of VAdm Ehrhard Schmidt; she served as the flagship of the squadron, which also included her four sister ships and the battleships Elsass and Braunschweig. On 26 August 1914, the ships were sent to rescue the stranded light cruiser Magdeburg, which had run aground off Odensholm in the eastern Baltic, but by 28 August, the ship's crew had been forced to detonate explosives to destroy Magdeburg before the relief force had arrived. As a result, Wittelsbach and the rest of the squadron returned to Bornholm that day. Starting on 3 September, IV Squadron, assisted by the armored cruiser Blücher, conducted a sweep into the Baltic. The operation lasted until 9 September and failed to bring Russian naval units to battle.

Two days later the ships were transferred to the North Sea, but stayed there only briefly, returning to the Baltic on 20 September. From 22 to 26 September, the squadron took part in a sweep into the eastern Baltic in an unsuccessful attempt to find and destroy Russian warships. From 4 December 1914 to 2 April 1915, the ships of the IV Squadron were tasked with coastal defense duties along Germany's North Sea coast against incursions from the British Royal Navy. On 3 April, Wittelsbach went into drydock in Kiel for periodic maintenance, before conducting training exercises in the western Baltic with the other ships of VII Division of IV Squadron, which included Wettin, Schwaben, and Mecklenburg.

The German Army requested naval assistance for its campaign against Russia; Prince Heinrich, the commander of all naval forces in the Baltic, made VII Division, IV Scouting Group, and the torpedo boats of the Baltic fleet available for the operation. On 6 May, the IV Squadron ships were tasked with providing support to the assault on Libau. Wittelsbach and the other ships were stationed off Gotland to intercept any Russian cruisers that might attempt to intervene in the landings; the Russians did not do so. After cruisers from IV Scouting Group encountered Russian cruisers off Gotland, the ships of VII Division deployed—with a third dummy funnel erected to disguise them as the more powerful Braunschweig-class battleships—along with the cruiser Danzig. The ships advanced as far as the island of Utö on 9 May and to Kopparstenarna the following day, but by then the Russian cruisers had withdrawn. Later that day, the British submarines HMS E1 and HMS E9 spotted IV Squadron, but were too far away to attack them.

From 27 May to 4 July, Wittelsbach was back in the North Sea, patrolling the mouths of the Jade, Ems, and Elbe rivers. During this period, the naval high command realized that the old Wittelsbach-class ships would be useless in action against the Royal Navy, but could be effectively used against the much weaker Russian forces in the Baltic. As a result, the battleships were transferred back to the Baltic in July, and they departed Kiel on the 7th, bound for Danzig. On 10 July, the ships proceeded further east to Neufahrwassar, along with the vessels of VIII Torpedo-boat Flotilla; after arriving, Wittelsbach ran aground and Schmidt transferred his flag to Braunschweig. She was able to free herself and was not damaged in the incident, and the following day Schmidt returned to the ship. The IV Squadron ships sortied on 12 July to make a demonstration, returning to Danzig on 21 July without encountering Russian forces.

==== Battle of the Gulf of Riga ====
The following month, the naval high command began an operation against the Gulf of Riga in support of the Gorlice–Tarnów Offensive that the Army was waging. The Baltic naval forces were reinforced with significant elements of the High Seas Fleet, including I Battle Squadron, I Scouting Group, II Scouting Group, and II Torpedo-boat Flotilla. Prince Heinrich planned that Schmidt's ships would force their way into the Gulf and destroy the Russian warships in Riga, while the heavy units of the High Seas Fleet would patrol to the north to prevent any of the main Russian Baltic Fleet that might try to interfere with the operation. The Germans launched their attack on 8 August, initiating the Battle of the Gulf of Riga. Minesweepers attempted to clear a path through the Irbe Strait, covered by Braunschweig and Elsass, while Wittelsbach and the rest of the squadron remained outside the strait. The Russian battleship Slava attacked the Germans in the strait, forcing them to withdraw.

During the action, the cruiser Thetis and the torpedo boat S144 were damaged by mines and the torpedo boats T52 and T58 were mined and sunk. Schmidt withdrew his ships to re-coal and Prince Heinrich debated making another attempt, as by that time it had become clear that the German Army's advance toward Riga had stalled. Prince Heinrich attempted to force the channel a second time using two dreadnought battleships from I Squadron to cover the minesweepers and leaving Wittelsbach behind in Libau. Following the unsuccessful second attempt, Schmidt became the I Squadron commander on 26 August, being replaced as the IV Squadron commander by VAdm Friedrich Schultz, who also made Wittelsbach his flagship.

==== Subsequent activity ====
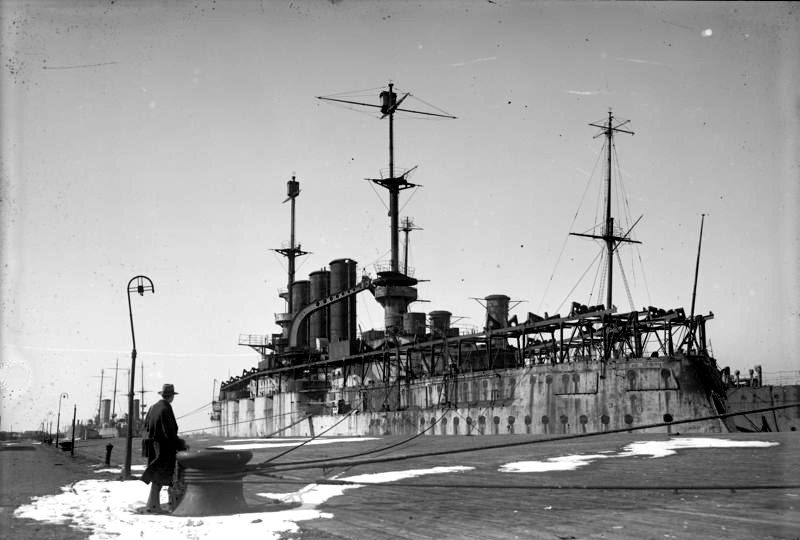
The battleship Preussen, which was also converted to carry minesweepers after the war. (c. 1930)

On 9 September, Wittelsbach and her four sisters sortied in an attempt to locate Russian warships off Gotland, but returned to port two days later without having engaged any opponents. On 7 and 8 October, she, Elsass, and four torpedo boats covered a minelaying operation. By this point in the war, the Navy was encountering difficulties in manning more important vessels. The threat from submarines in the Baltic convinced the German navy to withdraw the elderly Wittelsbach-class ships from active service. Wittelsbach and most of the other IV Squadron ships left Libau on 10 November, bound for Kiel; upon arrival the following day, they were designated the Reserve Division of the Baltic, commanded by Kommodore (Commodore) Walter Engelhardt. The ships were anchored in Schilksee in Kiel, with Wittelsbach as the divisional flagship. On 31 January 1916, the division was dissolved, and the ships were dispersed for subsidiary duties.

Wittelsbach was decommissioned on 24 August, and was initially used as a training ship based in Kiel. The ship was then transferred to Wilhelmshaven for use as a fleet tender in October 1917, where she supported the battleship Lothringen, which was by then being used as a training ship for engine room personnel. On 6 August 1918, the Reichsmarineamt decided to convert Wittelsbach into a target ship, but the war ended with Germany's defeat before the work could begin. Wittelsbach was reactivated for service with the newly constituted Reichsmarine on 1 June 1919, and was converted into a depot ship for minesweepers. She carried 12 of these shallow-draft vessels. The ship served in this capacity from 20 July 1920 to 8 March 1921. Wittelsbach was stricken from the Navy List and sold four months later, on 7 July, for 3,561,000 Marks. The ship was then broken up for scrap in Wilhelmshaven.
