= Wittelsbach-class battleship =

Battleship class of the German Imperial Navy

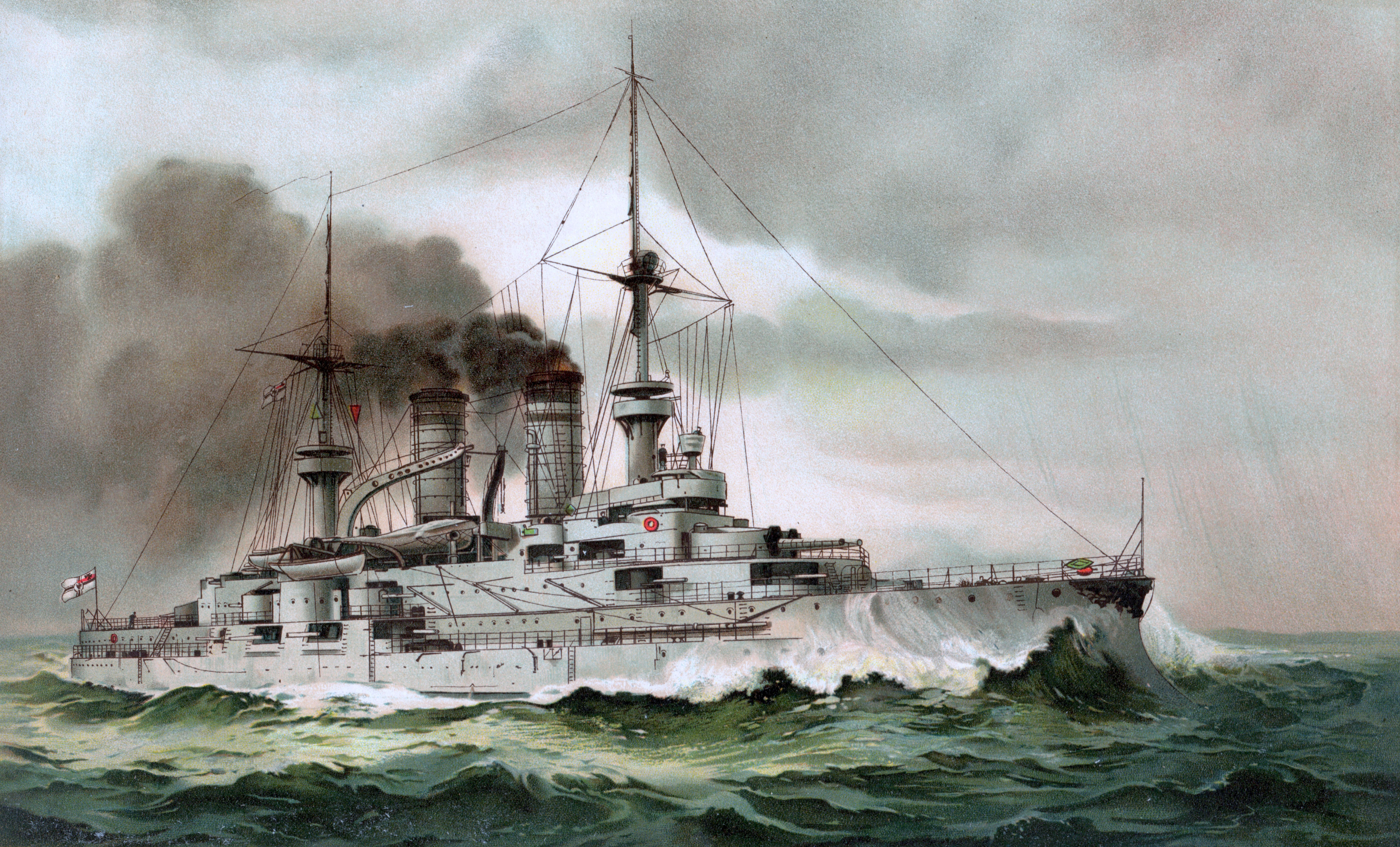
- Lithograph of Zähringen in 1902

Class overview
- Builders: Kaiserliche Werft Wilhelmshaven (2); AG Vulcan Stettin (1); Friedrich Krupp Germaniawerft (1); Schichau-Werke (1)
- Operators: Imperial German Navy; Reichsmarine; Kriegsmarine
- Preceded by: Kaiser Friedrich III class
- Succeeded by: Braunschweig class
- Built: 1899–1904
- In service: 1902–1944
- In commission: 1902–1921
- Planned: 5
- Completed: 5
- Lost: 1
- Scrapped: 4

General characteristics
- Type: Pre-dreadnought battleship
- Displacement: Normal: 11,774 t (11,588 long tons); Full-load displacement: 12,798 t (12,596 long tons)
- Length: 126.8 m (416 ft) (loa)
- Beam: 22.8 m (74 ft 10 in)
- Draft: 7.95 m (26 ft 1 in)
- Installed power: 6 × fire-tube boilers; 6 × water-tube boilers; 14,000 PS (13,808 ihp; 10,297 kW)
- Propulsion: 3 × triple-expansion steam engines; 3 × screw propellers
- Speed: 18 knots (33 km/h; 21 mph)
- Range: 5,000 nautical miles (9,300 km; 5,800 mi); 10 knots (19 km/h; 12 mph)
- Complement: 33 officers; 650 enlisted men
- Armament: 4 × 24 cm (9.4 in) guns (40 cal.); 18 × 15 cm (5.9 in) SK L/40 guns; 12 × 8.8 cm (3.5 in) SK L/30 guns; 6 × 45 cm (17.7 in) torpedo tubes
- Armor: Belt: 100 to 225 mm (3.9 to 8.9 in); Turrets: 250 mm (9.8 in); Deck: 50 mm (2 in)

The Wittelsbach-class battleships were a group of five pre-dreadnought battleships built for the German Kaiserliche Marine (Imperial Navy) in the early 1900s. They were the first battleships ordered under the First Navy Law of 1898, part of Admiral Alfred von Tirpitz's fleet expansion program. The class comprised the lead ship, Wittelsbach, and Wettin, Zähringen, Schwaben, and Mecklenburg. All five ships were laid down between 1899 and 1900 and were finished by 1904. The ships of the Wittelsbach class were similar in appearance to their predecessors in the Kaiser Friedrich III class, but had a more extensive armor belt and a flush main deck, as opposed to the lower quarterdeck of the previous class. Both classes carried a battery of four 24 cm (9.4 in) guns in two twin-gun turrets.

Wittelsbach, Wettin, Mecklenburg, and Zähringen served in I Squadron for the duration of their peacetime careers, where they were primarily occupied with training exercises and cruises abroad. Schwaben was used as a training ship to modernize the training unit of the German fleet. By 1910, with the arrival of the first dreadnought battleships, the Wittelsbach-class ships were removed from front-line service and relegated to training duties or simply laid up in reserve. With the outbreak of World War I in July 1914, the ships returned to active service as IV Battle Squadron, seeing guard duty in the North Sea and limited operations in the Baltic Sea against Russian forces. These operations included supporting the attack on Libau in May 1915 and the Battle of the Gulf of Riga in August that year.

By late 1915, the naval command had decided to decommission the five ships owing to a combination of crew shortages for more important vessels and the increased threat of British submarines operating in the Baltic. The ships were thereafter used as training vessels or, in the case of Mecklenburg, a prison ship. Wittelsbach and Schwaben were converted into depot ships for minesweepers in the postwar effort to clear up the minefields that had been laid in the North Sea. Those two ships, Mecklenburg, and Wettin were stricken from the naval register in the early 1920s and thereafter broken up, but Zähringen was converted into a radio-controlled target ship, a role she filled until she was bombed and sunk by British bombers in 1944 during World War II. The wreck was eventually broken up in 1949–1950.

== Design ==
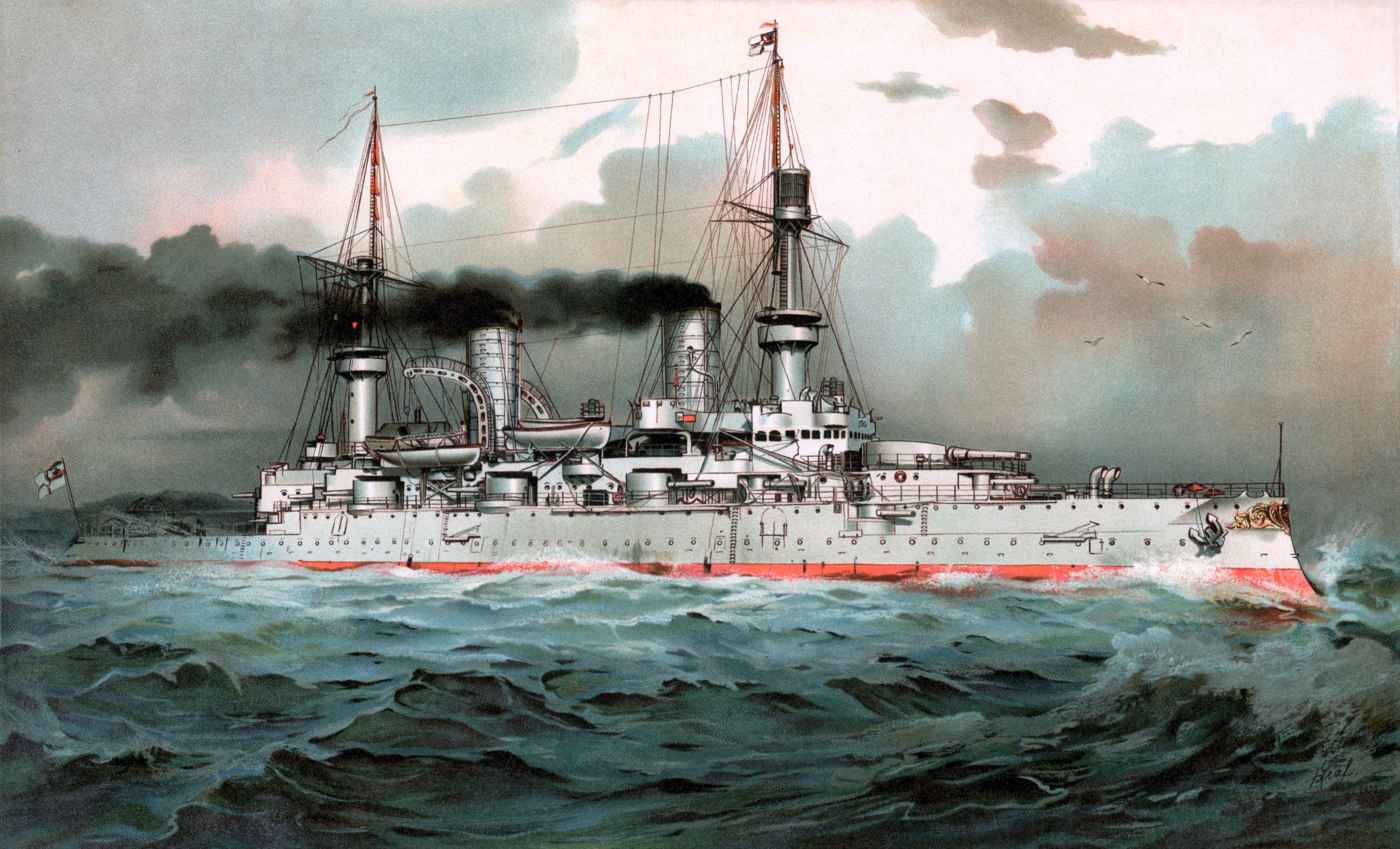
Lithograph of Kaiser Wilhelm II of the Kaiser Friedrich III class, c. 1900

The ships of the Wittelsbach class were the first battleships built under the first Naval Law of 1898 that had been passed through the efforts of Admiral Alfred von Tirpitz, the State Secretary of the Reichsmarineamt (Imperial Navy Office). They were designed by Prof. Dr. Dietrich, then the chief constructor.

The ships represented an incremental improvement over the preceding Kaiser Friedrich III class. Although Konteradmiral (Rear Admiral) Emil Felix von Bendemann had argued for an increase in the main battery from the 24-centimeter (9.4 in) guns of the Kaiser Friedrich III class to more powerful 28 cm (11 in) guns, the Wittelsbach-class ships were equipped with the same armament of 24 cm guns, but were given an additional torpedo tube, along with other improvements. The incremental nature of the changes resulted in two classes of battleships that were in most important respects identical, providing the German fleet with a tactically homogeneous group of ten battleships.

The design staff considered a variety of other alterations from the basic Kaiser Friedrich III design, including replacing four of the secondary battery casemate guns with a pair of turret-mounted 21 cm (8.3 in) guns and reducing the scale of armor protection to increase the top speed by 0.75 knots (1.39 km/h; 0.86 mph). Though both of these proposals were rejected, the actual thickness of the armor plate was considerably reduced through the adoption of Krupp cemented armor, which had significantly greater protective value compared to early steel manufacturing processes. The weight savings, combined with a 5 percent increase in engine power, permitted the top speed to be increased by 0.5 knots (0.93 km/h; 0.58 mph). The lighter armor also allowed the adoption a more comprehensive armored belt, which significantly improved the new ships' defensive capabilities. The Wittelsbachs also differed from the preceding ships in their main deck, the entire length of which was flush; in the Kaiser Friedrich III-class ships, the quarterdeck was cut down.

=== General characteristics and machinery ===
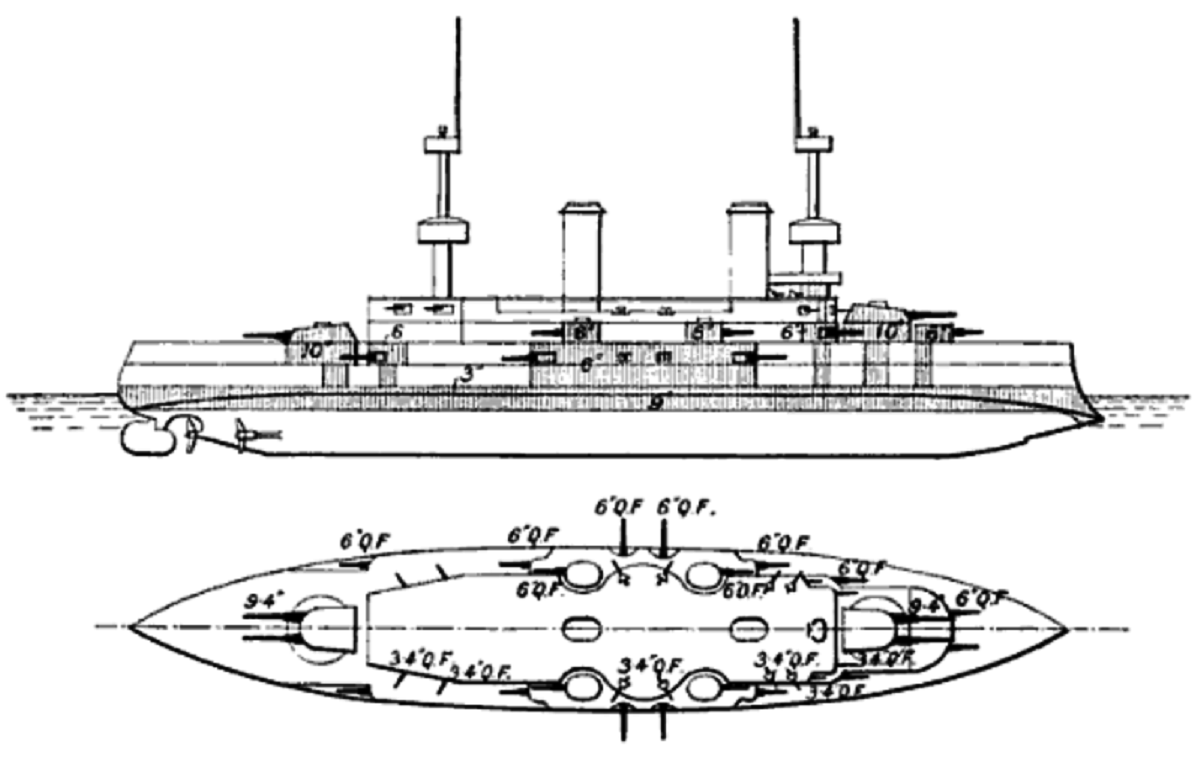
Plan and profile drawing of the Wittelsbach class

The ships of the Wittelsbach class were 125.2 meters (410 ft 9 in) long at the waterline and 126.8 m (416 ft) overall. They had a beam of 22.8 m (74 ft 10 in) and a draft of 7.95 m (26 ft 1 in) forward. The Wittelsbachs were designed to displace 11,774 metric tons (11,588 long tons) with a standard load, and displaced up to 12,798 metric tons (12,596 long tons) at full combat weight. The Wittelsbach-class ships' hulls were built with transverse and longitudinal steel frames. Steel hull plates were riveted to the structure created by the frames. Each hull was split into 14 watertight compartments and included a double bottom that ran for 70 percent of its length.

The ships were regarded in the German Navy as excellent sea boats with an easy roll; the ships rolled up to 30° with a period of 10 seconds. They maneuvered easily; at hard rudder the ships lost up to 60 percent speed and heeled over 9°. However, they suffered from severe vibration, particularly at the stern, at high speeds. They also had very wet bows, even in moderate seas.

The ships had a crew of 33 officers and 650 enlisted men, with an additional 13 officers and 66 enlisted men when serving as squadron flagship. While acting as a second command ship, 9 officers and 44 enlisted men were added to the standard crew. Wittelsbach and her sisters carried a number of smaller vessels, including two picket boats, two launches, one pinnace, two cutters, two yawls, and two dinghies.

The five ships of the Wittelsbach class each had three 3-cylinder triple expansion steam engines. The outer engines drove a three-bladed screw that was 4.8 m (15 ft 9 in) in diameter; the central shaft drove a four-bladed screw that was slightly smaller, at 4.5 m (14 ft 9 in) in diameter. To produce steam to power the engines, each ship had six marine-type boilers, with the exception of Wettin and Mecklenburg, which had six Thornycroft boilers, along with six transverse cylindrical boilers. Steering was controlled by a single large rudder. Electrical power was supplied by four generators that each produced 230 kilowatts (310 PS) at 74 volts, although in Wittelsbach the generators were rated at 248 kilowatts (337 PS).

The propulsion system was rated at 14,000 metric horsepower (13,808 ihp) and a top speed of 18 knots (33 km/h; 21 mph), but on trials, the five ships had significantly varied performances. Schwaben, the slowest ship, reached 13,253 PS (13,072 ihp) and was only capable of steaming at 16.9 knots (31.3 km/h; 19.4 mph). Wettin, the fastest, slightly exceeded her design speed at 18.1 knots (33.5 km/h; 20.8 mph) from 15,530 PS (15,318 ihp). They carried 650 metric tons (640 long tons) in their holds, but fuel capacity could be nearly tripled to 1,800 metric tons (1,772 long tons) with the usage of additional spaces in the ships. This provided a maximum range of 5,000 nautical miles (9,260 km; 5,754 mi) at a cruising speed of 10 knots (19 km/h; 12 mph).

=== Armament ===
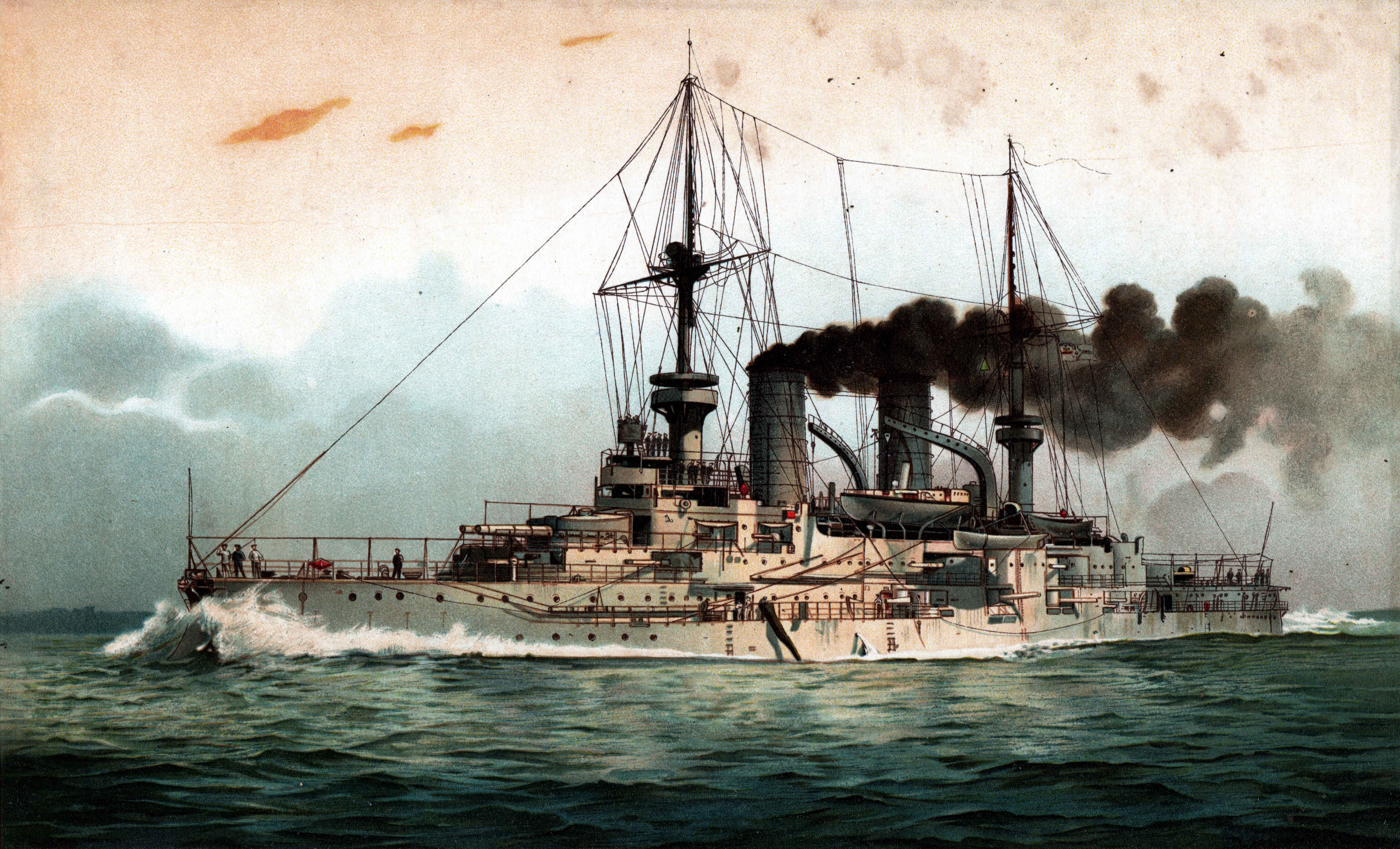
Lithograph of Mecklenburg in 1902

The ships were nearly identical in armament to the preceding Kaiser Friedrich III class. The primary armament consisted of a battery of four 24 cm (9.4 in) SK L/40 guns in twin-gun turrets, (Note: In Imperial German Navy gun nomenclature, "SK" (Schnelladekanone) denotes that the gun is quick firing, while the L/40 denotes the length of the gun. In this case, the L/40 gun is 40 caliber, meaning that the gun is 40 times as long as its diameter.) one fore and one aft of the central superstructure. The guns were mounted in C/98 turrets, which allowed elevation to 30° and depression to −5°. At maximum elevation, the guns could hit targets out to 16,900 meters (18,500 yd). The guns fired 140-kilogram (310 lb) shells at a muzzle velocity of 835 meters per second (2,740 ft/s). Each gun was supplied with 85 shells, for a total of 340. The turrets were hydraulically operated.

Secondary armament included eighteen 15 cm (5.9 inch) SK L/40 guns; four were mounted in single turrets amidships and the rest were mounted in MPL casemates. (Note: MPL stands for Mittel-Pivot-Lafette (Central pivot mounting).) The casemates were located at the main deck level, which made them difficult to work in heavy seas. These guns fired armor-piercing shells at a rate of 4 to 5 per minute. The ships carried 120 shells per gun, for a total of 2,160 rounds total. The guns could depress to −7 degrees and elevate to 20 degrees, for a maximum range of 13,700 m (14,990 yd). The shells weighed 51-kilogram (112 lb) and were fired at a muzzle velocity of 735 m/s (2,410 ft/s). The guns were manually elevated and trained.

The ships also carried twelve 8.8 cm (3.45 in) SK L/30 quick-firing guns, also mounted in casemates and pivot mounts. These guns were supplied with between 170 and 250 shells per gun. These guns fired 7.04 kg (15.5 lb) at a muzzle velocity of 590 mps (1,936 fps). Their rate of fire was approximately 15 shells per minute; the guns could engage targets out to 6,890 m (7,530 yd). The gun mounts were manually operated.

The ships' gun armament was rounded out by twelve 3.7 cm (1.5 in) machine cannon. The ships were also armed with six 45 cm (17.7 in) torpedo tubes, all submerged in the hull; one was in the bow, another in the stern, and two on each broadside. These weapons were 5.1 m (201 in) long and carried an 87.5 kg (193 lb) TNT warhead. They could be set at two speeds for different ranges. At 26 knots (48 km/h; 30 mph), the torpedoes had a range of 800 m (870 yd). At an increased speed of 32 knots (59 km/h; 37 mph), the range was reduced to 500 m (550 yd).

=== Armor ===
The five Wittelsbach-class battleships were armored with Krupp cemented steel. Their armored decks were 50 mm (2 in) thick, with sloped sides that ranged in thickness from 75 to 120 mm (3.0 to 4.7 in). The sloped section of the deck connected it to the lower edge of the main armored belt, which was 225 mm (8.9 in) in the central citadel where it protected the ships' ammunition magazines and the propulsion system. Connecting the sloped deck to the lower edge of the belt provided additional protection to the ships' interiors for shells that penetrated the belt. Forward and aft of the main battery turrets, the belt was reduced to 100 mm (3.9 in); the bow and stern were not protected with any armor. The entire length of belt was backed by 100 mm of teak planking.

Directly above the main belt, the 15 cm casemate guns were protected with a strake of 140 mm (5.5 in) thick steel plating. The 15 cm guns in turrets were more exposed and therefore slightly better protected: their side armor was increased to 150 mm (5.9 in), with gun shields 70 mm (2.8 in) thick. The 24 cm gun turrets had the heaviest armor aboard ship, with sides 250 mm (9.8 in) thick and roofs 50 mm thick. The forward conning tower also had 250 mm armor, though its roof was only 30 mm (1.2 in) thick. The rear conning tower was much less protected. Its sides were only 140 mm thick; the roof was 30 mm thick.

The ships' armor layout compared favorably to many foreign contemporaries; they were protected similarly to the British Formidable- and London-class battleships, and while their belts were thinner than those of the French République class or the Russian Tsesarevich, they did not suffer from the unarmored (and very vulnerable) hulls above the belt that characterized the French and Russian battleships.

== Ships ==
Construction data
Ship	Contract name	Builder	Laid down	Launched	Commissioned
Wittelsbach	C	Kaiserliche Werft Wilhelmshaven	30 September 1899	3 July 1900	15 October 1902
Wettin	D	Schichau-Werke, Danzig	10 October 1899	6 June 1901	1 October 1902
Zähringen	E	Germaniawerft, Kiel	21 November 1899	12 June 1901	25 October 1902
Schwaben	F	Kaiserliche Werft Wilhelmshaven	15 September 1900	19 August 1901	13 April 1904
Mecklenburg	G	AG Vulcan, Stettin	15 May 1900	9 November 1901	25 May 1903

== Service history ==
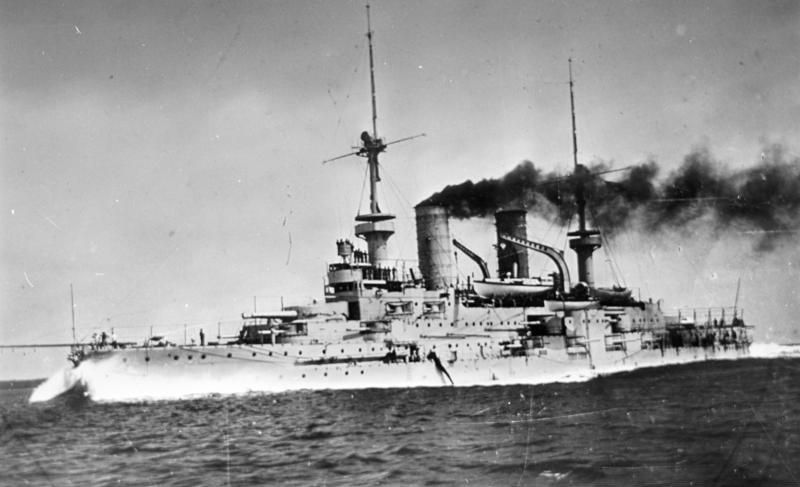
SMS Wittelsbach, c. 1902

=== Peacetime careers ===
All of the ships of the Wittelsbach class save Schwaben were assigned to I Squadron on entering service; Schwaben was instead assigned to the Training Squadron at Tirpitz's insistence. At the time, the Training Squadron's reliance on obsolescent ships hindered its ability to effectively train crews; the squadron ship that Schwaben replaced was the ancient ironclad warship Friedrich Carl, which had been launched in 1867. The other ships' peacetime careers generally consisted of the routine fleet, squadron, and individual training throughout each year. Squadron and fleet training typically took place in April and May and a major fleet cruise generally followed in June and July, after which the fleet assembled for the annual autumn fleet maneuvers in late August and September. The major fleet cruises typically went to Norwegian waters in company with Kaiser Wilhelm II's yacht, though in 1908 and 1909, the fleet embarked on long-distance cruises out into the Atlantic, making visits to mainland Spain, the Canary Islands, and the Azores, Portugal.

The ships also frequently steamed to foreign ports on goodwill visits; for example, in July 1904, I Squadron toured Britain and the Netherlands, and in July 1905 the ships went to Denmark and Sweden. By 1910, the ships began to be withdrawn from front-line service, their place having been taken by the dreadnought battleships of the Nassau and Helgoland classes. Zähringen was decommissioned in 1910 and placed in the Reserve Division, seeing little activity for the next four years; Mecklenburg joined her there the following year and was reactivated once, briefly, in 1912 for the annual autumn maneuvers. Wittelsbach joined Schwaben in the Training Squadron in 1911, and Wettin replaced Schwaben, which was by then the fleet's gunnery training ship, while the latter underwent an overhaul in 1912. Schwaben thereafter went into reserve.

=== World War I ===
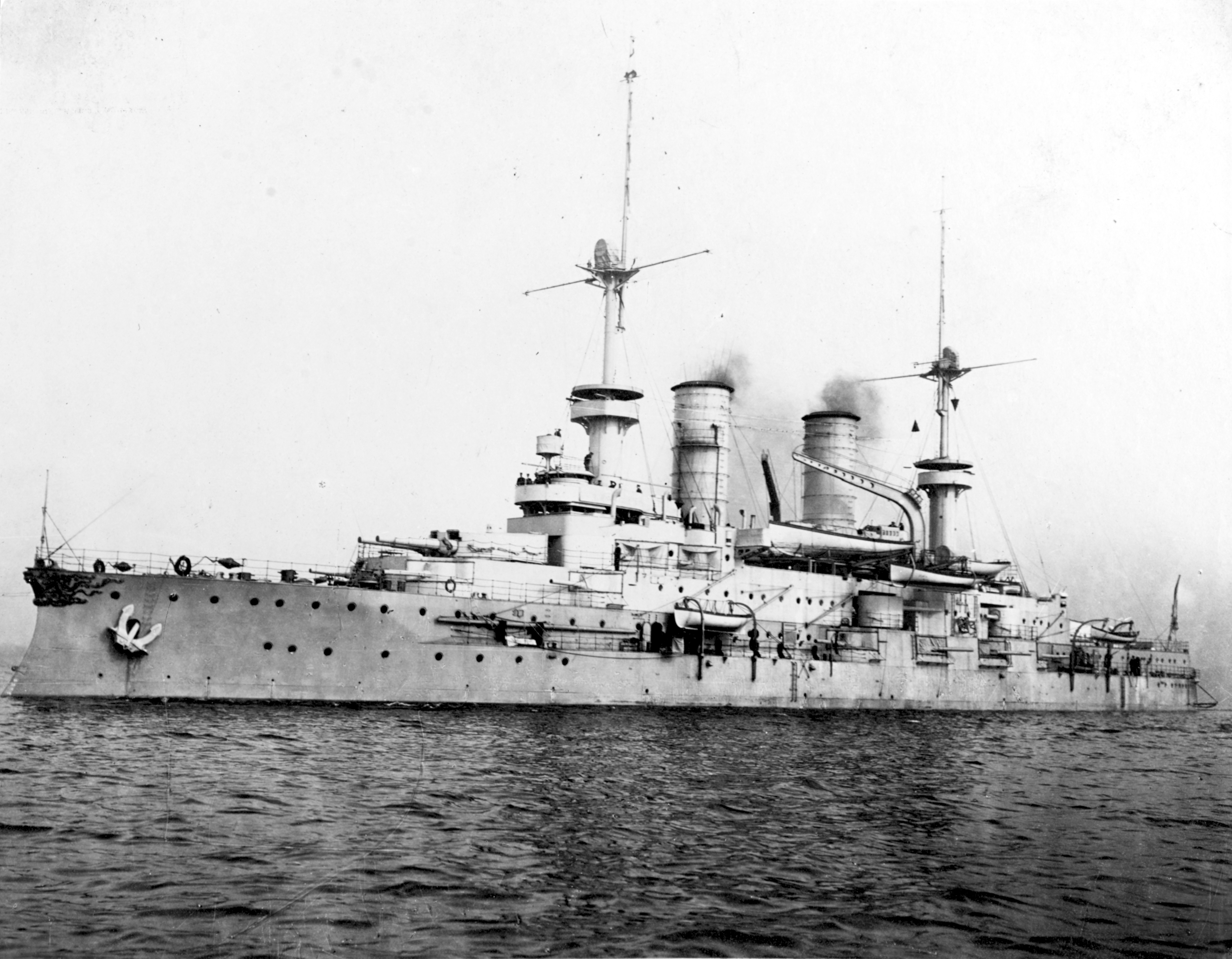
Wittelsbach c. 1910

Following the outbreak of World War I in July 1914, the five Wittelsbach-class ships were mobilized into IV Battle Squadron, under the command of Vice Admiral Ehrhard Schmidt. The squadron was based in Kiel, and they conducted several sorties into the Baltic Sea to patrol for Russian warships but they saw no action. These operations included a failed attempt to rescue the light cruiser Magdeburg that had run aground in Russian territory in late August, and screening the joint Army Navy attack on Libau against a possible Russian counterattack in May 1915. After Libau was seized, IV Squadron relocated there as it provided an advance base closer to the front line. The ships were also used to guard the mouth of the Elbe in the North Sea in the first year of the war. The Wittelsbach class supported the Battle of the Gulf of Riga in August 1915, but did not take an active role in the attack before it broke down in the face of determined Russian resistance.

Further operations took place in September and October, which included IV Squadron covering the laying of defensive minefields in the western Baltic. By this time, manpower shortages began to affect the German fleet; combined with the increased threat of British submarines operating in the Baltic, the inability to man more important vessels convinced the naval command of the need to remove the Wittelsbachs from service. The squadron returned to Kiel in November, where it was re-designated as the Reserve Division of the Baltic Sea. In January 1916, it was dissolved altogether and the ships were reduced to training ships except for Mecklenburg, which was used as a prison ship. The ships served in those roles for the remainder of the war, which ended in 1918.

=== Postwar fates ===
In 1919, Wittelsbach and Schwaben were converted into depot ships for F-type minesweepers, since Germany was required by the Treaty of Versailles to clear the extensive minefields that had been laid in the North Sea during the war. (Note: Treaty of Versailles: Part V. Military, Naval and Air Clauses: Section II: Naval Clauses, Articles 182 and 193.) The entire class, with the exception of Zähringen, were struck from the navy list after the end of World War I. Mecklenburg was struck on 27 January 1920, Wettin followed on 11 March 1920, and Wittelsbach and Schwaben were struck on 8 March 1921. The four ships were broken up in 1921–1922. Zähringen was initially used as a storage hulk in the 1920s and was converted into a radio-controlled target ship in 1926–1927. The superstructure was cut down extensively; her hull was subdivided, filled with cork, and sealed to improve its resistance to flooding. Royal Air Force bombers sank the ship in Gotenhafen in 1944 during World War II, and the wreck was broken up in 1949–1950.
