= Kopparstenarna =

Swedish shoal

- Kopparstenarna (Baltic Sea)
- Interactive map of Kopparstenarna

Geography
- Location: North of Gotska Sandön
- Coordinates: 58°34′0.12″N 19°12′59.76″E

Administration
- Sweden
- County: Gotland County

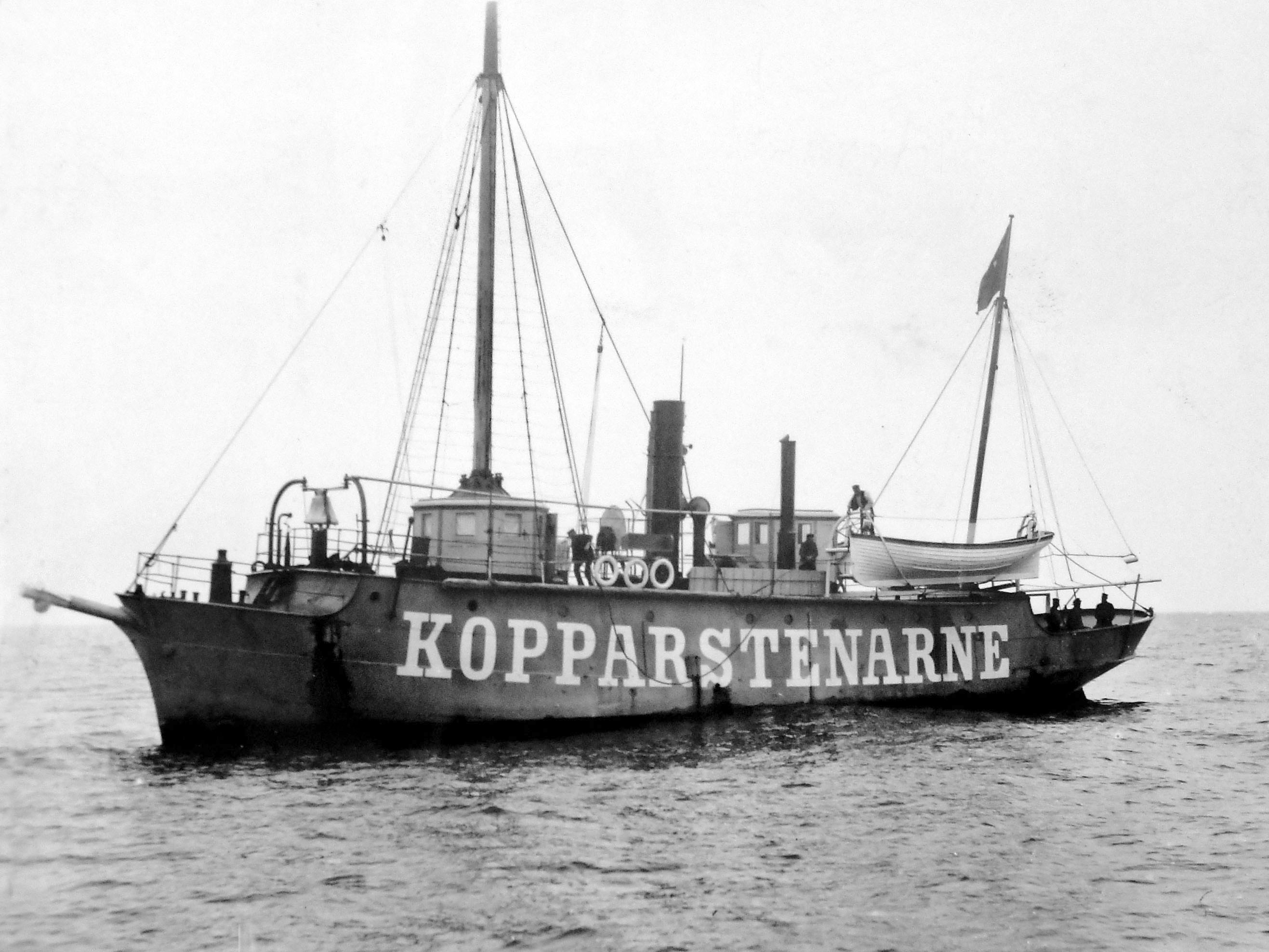
The lightship Kopparstenarne, at the Kopparstenarna shoal, 1893

Kopparstenarna (The Copper Stones) is a shoal off the coast of Sweden in the Baltic Sea, north of the island of Gotland, in the northern end of the Gotland Basin.

== Description ==
The shoal, or shallow, is located approximately 60 km (37 mi) north of Gotland and 20 km (12 mi) north of Gotska Sandön. The shallow, which measures 6 km (3.7 mi) at its longest points in the northeast and southwest, consists mainly of sand and boulders. The depth ranges from 1 to 5 m (3 ft 3 in to 16 ft 5 in). Kopparstenarna is the northernmost part of a terminal moraine that extends via Gotska Sandön down to the shoal Salvorev, near Fårö. Since 1987, Kopparstenarna has been part of the Salvorev-Kopparstenarna Nature Reserve.

=== Name ===
Kopparstenarna takes its name from a shipwreck that occurred there in the 17th century, when a ship was sunk. It was loaded with metal cannons, and copper wire intended for leather cannons.

=== Dreaded shoal ===
The Kopparstenarna shallow used to be a dreaded shoal. In 1858–59, two lighthouses were built on Gotska Sandön to warn sailors of the treacherous rocks hiding just under the surface. Thanks to the lighthouses, more merchant ships now dared to sail west of Gotland, which also saved time.

=== Lightships ===
From 1883 to 1915, six different lightships were stationed at Kopparstenarna. Since 1915, the area has been marked by light buoys.

=== Future skerry ===
The Kopparstenarna shallow lie on the outer edge of Sweden’s territorial waters. If the tectonic uplift continues, the Kopparstenarna shallow will break through the water’s surface in a few hundred years and form a skerry. If the territorial waters boundary then extends 12 nautical miles from the Kopparstenarna shallow, a contiguous stretch of territorial waters will be created between Gotland and the Swedish mainland.
