= I Battle Squadron =

German military unit

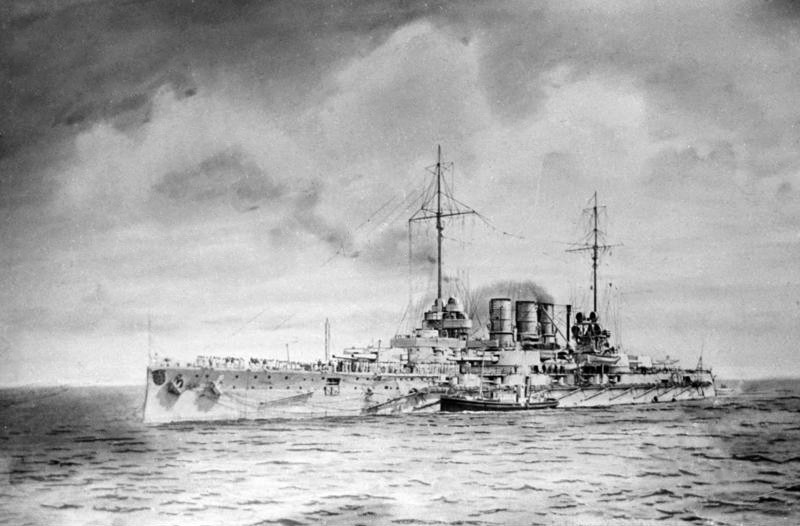
- SMS Ostfriesland, the squadron flagship at the Battle of Jutland
- Country: German Empire
- Branch: German Imperial Navy
- Type: Squadron
- Part of: High Seas Fleet
- Garrison/HQ: Wilhelmshaven; Kiel
- Engagements: World War I: Battle of Jutland

Commanders
- Notable commanders: Henning von Holtzendorff; Ehrhard Schmidt

The I Battle Squadron was a unit of the German Imperial Navy before and during World War I. Being part of the High Seas Fleet, the squadron saw action throughout the war, including the Battle of Jutland on 31 May – 1 June 1916, where it formed the center of the German line.

== See also ==
- Imperial German Navy order of battle (1914)
