= SMS Kaiser =

SMS Kaiser has been the name of two ships of the German Imperial Navy:

- SMS Kaiser (1874), a Kaiser-class ironclad
- SMS Kaiser (1911), a Kaiser-class battleship which served through World War I
- SMS Kaiser (1905), a fleet auxiliary converted into a minelayer during World War I

Additionally, a number of Imperial Navy vessels were given names of specific kaisers:

- SMS Kaiser Barbarossa, a Kaiser Friedrich III-class battleship, launched 1900
- SMS Kaiser Friedrich III, a Kaiser Friedrich III-class battleship, launched 1896
- SMS Kaiser Karl der Grosse, a Kaiser Friedrich III-class battleship, launched 1899
- SMS Kaiser Wilhelm II, a Kaiser Friedrich III-class battleship, launched 1897
- SMS Kaiser Wilhelm der Grosse, a Kaiser Friedrich III-class battleship, launched 1899

Two ships have been named Kaiserin:

- SMS Kaiserin Augusta: a unique protected cruiser, launched 1892
- SMS Kaiserin, a Kaiser-class battleship, launched 1911

SMS Kaiser was the name of a ship of the Austro-Hungarian Navy:

- SMS Kaiser (1858), the last wooden ship of the line of the Austro-Hungarian Navy.
