= SMS Kaiser Wilhelm II =

Battleship of the German Imperial Navy

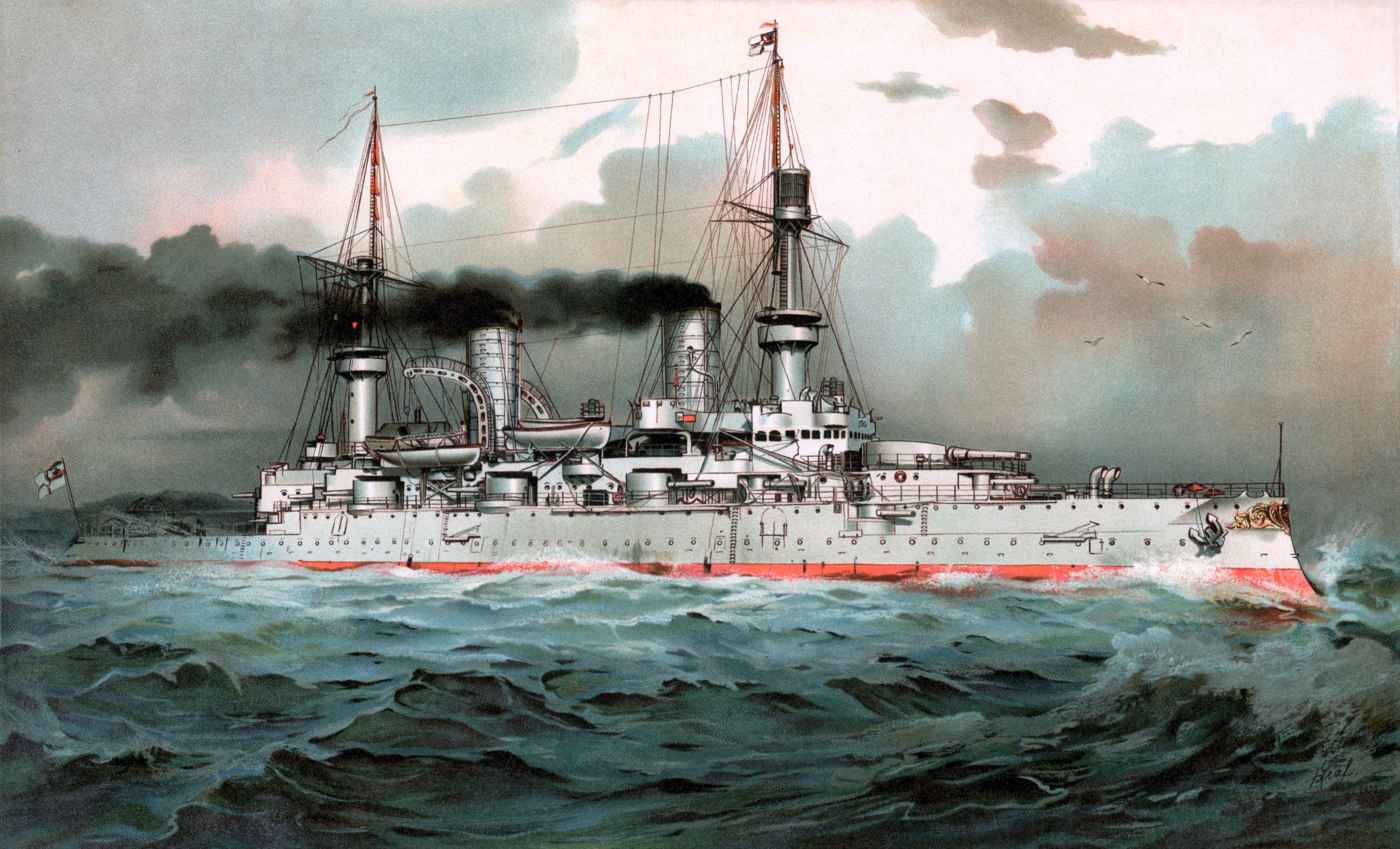
- Lithograph of Kaiser Wilhelm II in 1900

History

Germany
- Name: Kaiser Wilhelm II
- Namesake: Wilhelm II
- Builder: Kaiserliche Werft Wilhelmshaven
- Laid down: 26 October 1896
- Launched: 14 September 1897
- Commissioned: 13 February 1900
- Stricken: 17 March 1921
- Fate: Scrapped in 1922

General characteristics
- Class & type: Kaiser Friedrich III-class battleship
- Displacement: Normal: 11,097 t (10,922 long tons); Full load: 11,785 t (11,599 long tons)
- Length: 125.3 m (411 ft 1 in)
- Beam: 20.4 m (66 ft 11 in)
- Draft: 7.89 m (25 ft 11 in)
- Installed power: 12 × water-tube boilers; 12,822 ihp (9,561 kW)
- Propulsion: 3 × triple-expansion steam engines; 3 × screw propellers
- Speed: 17.5 knots (32.4 km/h; 20.1 mph)
- Range: 3,420 nmi (6,330 km; 3,940 mi) at 10 knots (19 km/h; 12 mph)
- Complement: 39 officers; 612 enlisted men
- Armament: 4 × 24 cm (9.45 in) 40 cal guns; 18 × 15 cm (5.9 in) SK L/40 guns; 12 × 8.8 cm (3.5 in) SK L/30 guns; 12 × 3.7 cm (1.5 in) machine cannon; 6 × 45 cm (17.7 in) torpedo tubes
- Armor: Belt: 300 to 150 mm (11.81 to 5.91 in); Deck: 65 mm (2.56 in); Conning Tower: 250 mm (9.84 in); Turrets: 250 mm (9.84 in); Casemates: 150 mm (5.91 in)

SMS Kaiser Wilhelm II ("His Majesty's Ship Emperor William II") (Note: "SMS" stands for "Seiner Majestät Schiff" (German: His Majesty's Ship).) was the second ship of the Kaiser Friedrich III class of pre-dreadnought battleships. She was built at the Imperial Dockyard in Wilhelmshaven and launched on 14 September 1897. The ship was commissioned into the fleet as its flagship on 13 February 1900. Kaiser Wilhelm II was armed with a main battery of four 24-centimeter (9.45 in) guns in two twin turrets. She was powered by triple expansion engines that delivered a top speed of 17.5 knots (32.4 km/h; 20.1 mph).

Kaiser Wilhelm II served as the flagship of the Active Battle Fleet until 1906, participating in numerous fleet training exercises and visits to foreign ports. She was replaced as flagship by the new battleship SMS Deutschland. After the new dreadnought battleships began entering service in 1908, Kaiser Wilhelm II was decommissioned and put into reserve. She was reactivated in 1910 for training ship duties in the Baltic, but was again taken out of service in 1912.

With the outbreak of World War I in August 1914, Kaiser Wilhelm II and her sisters were brought back into active duty as coastal defense ships in V Battle Squadron. Her age, coupled with shortages of ship crews, led to her withdrawal from this role in February 1915, after which she served as a command ship for the High Seas Fleet, based in Wilhelmshaven. Following the end of the war in November 1918, Kaiser Wilhelm II was stricken from the navy list and sold for scrap in the early 1920s. Her bow ornament is preserved at the Military History Museum of the Bundeswehr in Dresden.

== Design ==
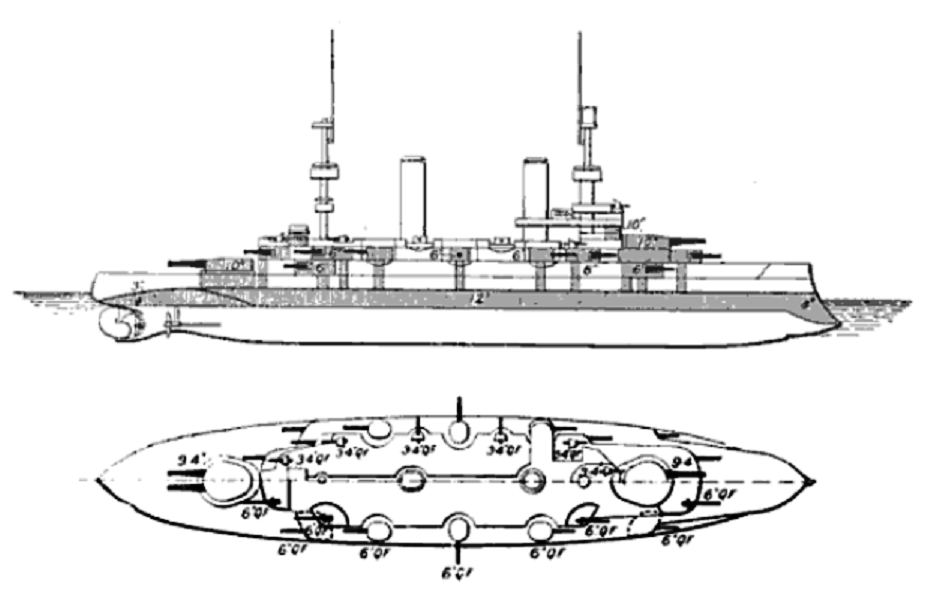
Plan and profile drawing of the Kaiser Friedrich III class

After the German Kaiserliche Marine (Imperial Navy) ordered the four Brandenburg-class battleships in 1889, a combination of budgetary constraints, opposition in the Reichstag (Imperial Diet), and a lack of a coherent fleet plan delayed the acquisition of further battleships. The former Secretary of the Reichsmarineamt (Imperial Navy Office), Leo von Caprivi became the Chancellor of Germany in 1890, and Vizeadmiral (Vice Admiral) Friedrich von Hollmann became the new Secretary of the Reichsmarineamt. Hollmann requested a new battleship in 1892 to replace the elderly ironclad turret-ship Preussen, built twenty years earlier, but the Franco-Russian Alliance, signed the year before, put the government's attention on expanding the Army's budget. Parliamentary opposition forced Hollmann to delay until the following year, when Caprivi spoke in favor of the project, noting that Russia's recent naval expansion threatened Germany's Baltic Sea coastline. In late 1893, Hollmann presented the Navy's estimates for the 1894–1895 budget year, again with a request for a replacement for Preussen, which was approved. The new ship abandoned the six-gun arrangement of the Brandenburgs for four large-caliber pieces, the standard arrangement of other navies at the time. A second member of the class, Kaiser Wilhelm II, was delayed until early 1896, when the Reichstag approved the ship for the 1896–1897 budget.

Kaiser Wilhelm II was 125.3 m (411 ft 1.07 in) long overall and had a beam of 20.4 m (66 ft 11.15 in). Her draft was 7.89 m (25 ft 10.63 in) forward and 8.25 m (27 ft 0.80 in) aft. She displaced 11,097 t (10,922 long tons) as designed and up to 11,785 t (11,599 long tons) at full load. The ship was powered by three 3-cylinder vertical triple-expansion steam engines that drove three screw propellers. Steam was provided by four marine-type and eight cylindrical water-tube boilers, all of which burned coal and were vented through a pair of tall funnels. Kaiser Wilhelm II's powerplant was rated at 12,822 indicated horsepower (9,561 kW), which generated a top speed of 17.5 knots (32.4 km/h; 20.1 mph). She had a cruising radius of 3,420 nautical miles (6,330 km; 3,940 mi) at a speed of 10 knots (19 km/h; 12 mph). She had a normal crew of 39 officers and 612 enlisted men; while serving as the fleet flagship, she carried an additional admiral's staff of 12 officers and 51–63 enlisted men.

The ship's armament consisted of a main battery of four 24 cm (9.4 in) SK L/40 guns in twin gun turrets, (Note: In Imperial German Navy gun nomenclature, "SK" (Schnelladekanone) denotes that the gun is quick firing, while the L/40 denotes the length of the gun. In this case, the L/40 gun is 40 caliber, meaning that the gun is 40 times as long as it is in diameter.) one fore and one aft of the central superstructure. Her secondary armament consisted of eighteen 15 cm (5.9 inch) SK L/40 guns carried in a mix of turrets and casemates. Close-range defense against torpedo boats was provided by a battery of twelve 8.8 cm (3.5 in) SK L/30 quick-firing guns all mounted in casemates. She also carried twelve 3.7 cm (1.5 in) machine cannon, but these were later removed. The armament suite was rounded out with six 45 cm (17.7 in) torpedo tubes, one of which was placed in an above-water swivel mount at the stern, with four submerged on the broadside and one submerged in the bow. The ship's belt armor was 300 mm (11.81 in) thick, and the main armor deck was 65 mm (2.56 in) thick. The conning tower and main battery turrets were protected with 250 mm (9.84 in) of armor plating, and the secondary casemates received 150 mm (5.91 in) of armor protection.

== Service history ==
=== Construction to 1902 ===
Kaiser Wilhelm II's keel was laid on 26 October 1896, at the Kaiserliche Werft in Wilhelmshaven, under construction number 24. Ordered under the contract name Ersatz Friedrich der Grosse, (Note: German warships were ordered under provisional names. Additions to the fleet were given a single letter; ships intended to replace older or lost vessels were ordered as "Ersatz (name of the ship to be replaced)".) to replace the elderly armored frigate Friedrich der Grosse, she was launched on 14 September 1897. During the launching ceremony, Konteradmiral (Rear Admiral) Prince Heinrich christened the ship for his brother, Kaiser Wilhelm II. She was commissioned on 13 February 1900, assuming the position of fleet flagship, which she held until 1906. Kaiser Wilhelm II was the first battleship of the German Navy specifically built to serve as a fleet flagship. After completing her sea trials in June 1900, she was assigned to II Division of I Squadron, where she replaced the old armored corvette Bayern in the division and the battleship Kurfürst Friedrich Wilhelm as flagship of the Active Battle Fleet.

In early July 1900, the four Brandenburg-class battleships, which were assigned to I Division of I Squadron, were ordered to East Asian waters to assist in the suppression of the Boxer Uprising. As a result, Kaiser Wilhelm II and the other ships of II Division were transferred to I Division on 8 July, under the command of Konteradmiral Paul Hoffmann. On 15 August the annual autumn maneuvers began; initially, the fleet practiced tactical maneuvers in the German Bight. A cruise in battle formation through the Kattegat followed, and the maneuvers concluded in the western Baltic on 21 September. During these exercises, Kaiser Wilhelm II served as the umpire ship, and so Hoffmann temporarily transferred his flag to her sister ship Kaiser Friedrich III. He returned to Kaiser Wilhelm II on 29 September after the conclusion of the exercises in Kiel.

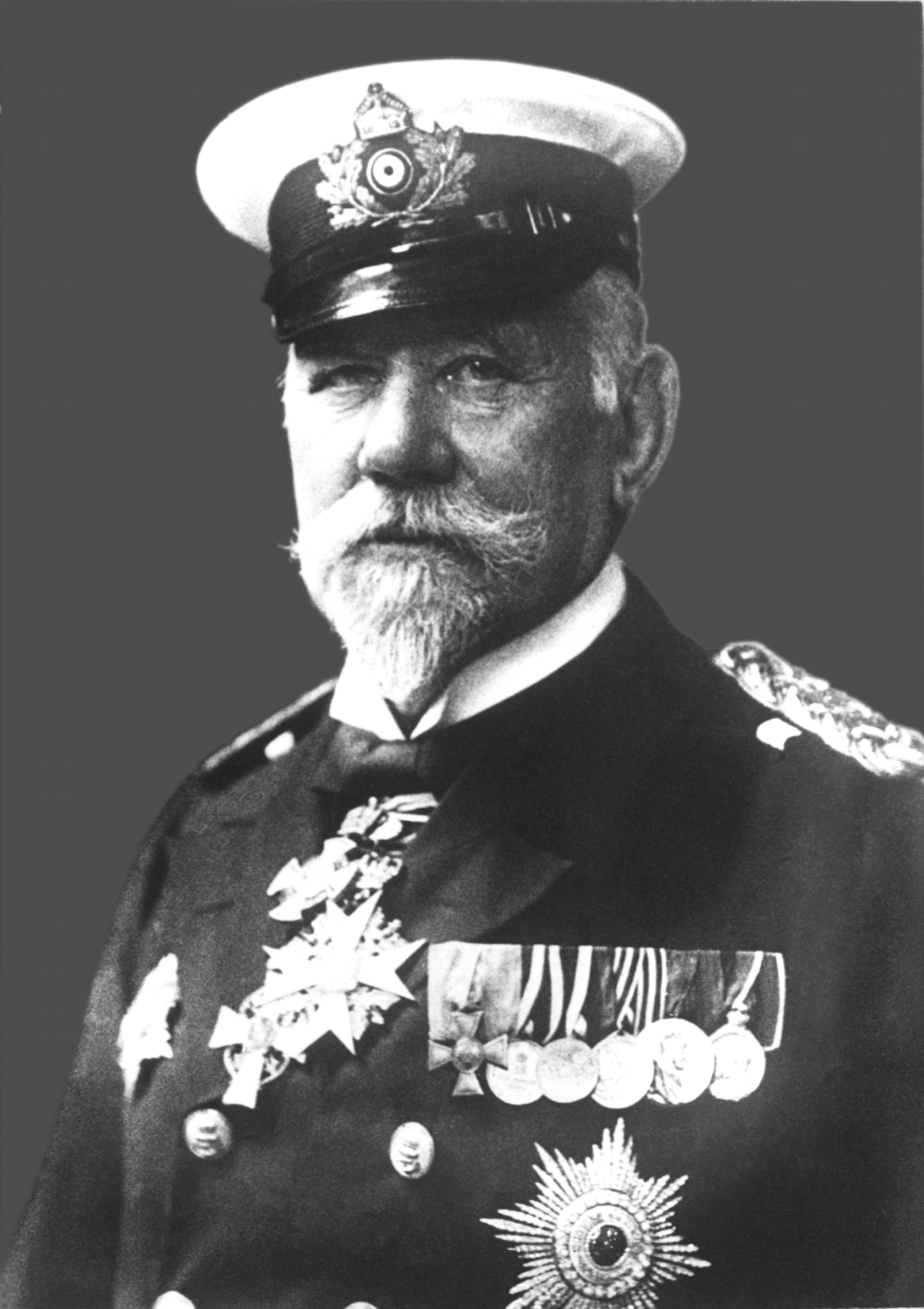
Admiral Hans von Koester, who would serve as the fleet commander aboard Kaiser Wilhelm II for the majority of her active career

On 1 November 1900, Kaiser Friedrich III replaced Kaiser Wilhelm II as the I Squadron flagship; the latter, as the fleet flagship, remained assigned to the squadron for tactical purposes. From 4 to 15 December, Kaiser Wilhelm II and I Squadron went on a winter training cruise to Norway; the ships anchored at Larvik from 10 to 12 December. Kaiser Wilhelm II went into drydock in January 1901 for overhaul and some modernization work. This included the reconstruction of a larger bridge and the removal of some of her searchlights. While the ship was laid up, Admiral Hans von Koester replaced Hoffmann as the fleet commander, a position he would hold until the end of 1906.

The annual training routine began at the end of March 1901 with squadron exercises in the Baltic. On the night of 1–2 April, Kaiser Friedrich III ran hard aground on the Adlergrund, a shoal to the east of Cape Arkona, and Kaiser Wilhelm II lightly brushed the bottom. After a short inspection, it was determined that Kaiser Wilhelm II was undamaged, and so Prince Heinrich transferred his flag to the ship on 23 April, while Kaiser Friedrich III went into drydock for repairs. In the meantime, on 18 April, Wilhelm II commissioned his son Prince Adalbert aboard Kaiser Wilhelm II. On 27 April, I Squadron conducted gunnery drills and a landing exercise off Apenrade. By 17 June, Kaiser Wilhelm II's sister ship Kaiser Wilhelm der Grosse had entered service, and so she took over flagship duties for the squadron, while Kaiser Wilhelm II returned to serving as only the fleet flagship. The squadron then went on a cruise to Spain, and while docked in Cádiz, rendezvoused with the Brandenburg-class battleships returning from East Asian waters. I Squadron was back in Kiel by 11 August, though the late arrival of the Brandenburgs delayed the participation of I Squadron in the annual autumn fleet training. The maneuvers began with exercises in the German Bight, followed by a mock attack on the fortifications in the lower Elbe. Gunnery drills took place in Kiel Bay before the fleet steamed to Danzig Bay; there, during the maneuvers, Wilhelm II and Czar Nicholas II of Russia visited the fleet and came aboard Kaiser Wilhelm II. The autumn maneuvers concluded on 15 September. Kaiser Wilhelm II and the rest of I Squadron went on their normal winter cruise to Norway in December, which included a stop at Oslo from 7 to 12 December, when the ship was visited by King Oscar II.

In January 1902, Kaiser Wilhelm II went into dock at Wilhelmshaven for her annual overhaul. In mid-March, Wilhelm II and his wife, Augusta Victoria, came aboard the ship and waited in the mouth of the Elbe for Wilhelm's brother Prince Heinrich, who was returning from the United States. I Squadron then went on a short cruise in the western Baltic before embarking on a major cruise around the British Isles, which lasted from 25 April to 28 May. Individual and squadron maneuvers took place from June to August, interrupted only by a cruise to Norway in July. During these maneuvers, three of Kaiser Wilhelm II's boiler tubes burst, but the damage was repaired by the start of the autumn maneuvers in August. These exercises began in the Baltic and concluded in the North Sea with a fleet review in the Jade. Kaiser Wilhelm II took no active part in the exercises; she instead served as an observation ship for the commander of the fleet, as well as her namesake, Kaiser Wilhelm II. The regular winter cruise followed during 1–12 December.

=== 1903–1905 ===
The first quarter of 1903 followed the usual pattern of training exercises. The squadron went on a training cruise in the Baltic, followed by a voyage to Spain that lasted from 7 May to 10 June. After returning to Germany, Kaiser Wilhelm II participated in the Kiel Week sailing regatta. In July, she joined I Squadron for the annual cruise to Norway. The autumn maneuvers consisted of a blockade exercise in the North Sea, a cruise of the entire fleet first to Norwegian waters and then to Kiel in early September, and finally a mock attack on Kiel. The exercises concluded on 12 September. Kaiser Wilhelm II finished the year's training schedule with a cruise into the eastern Baltic that started on 23 November and a cruise into the Skagerrak that began on 1 December. During the latter, the ship stopped in the Danish port of Frederikshavn.

Kaiser Wilhelm II steaming at high speed

Kaiser Wilhelm II participated in an exercise in the Skagerrak from 11 to 21 January 1904, after which she returned to Kiel. She then went to the Norwegian city of Ålesund to assist with the major fire that devastated the largely wooden city on 23 January. Squadron exercises followed from 8 to 17 March. A major fleet exercise took place in the North Sea in May, and Kaiser Wilhelm II was again present at Kiel Week in June, where she was visited by Britain's King Edward VII, Lord William Palmer, and Prince Louis of Battenberg. In June, Kaiser Wilhelm II won the Kaiser's Schießpreis (Shooting Prize) for excellent gunnery. The following month, I Squadron and I Scouting Group visited Britain, including a stop at Plymouth on 10 July. The German fleet departed on 13 July, bound for the Netherlands; I Squadron anchored in Vlissingen the following day. There, the ships were visited by Queen Wilhelmina. I Squadron remained in Vlissingen until 20 July, when they departed for a cruise in the northern North Sea with the rest of the fleet. The squadron stopped in Molde, Norway, on 29 July, while the other units went to other ports.

The fleet reassembled on 6 August and steamed back to Kiel, where it conducted a mock attack on the harbor on 12 August. During its cruise in the North Sea, the fleet experimented with wireless telegraphy on a large scale and searchlights at night for communication and recognition signals. Immediately after returning to Kiel, the fleet began preparations for the autumn maneuvers, which began on 29 August in the Baltic. The fleet moved to the North Sea on 3 September, where it took part in a major landing operation, after which the ships took the ground troops from IX Corps that participated in the exercises to Altona for a parade for Wilhelm II. The ships then conducted their own parade for the Kaiser off the island of Helgoland on 6 September. Three days later, the fleet returned to the Baltic via the Kaiser Wilhelm Canal, where it participated in further landing operations with IX Corps and the Guards Corps. On 15 September, the maneuvers came to an end. I Squadron went on its winter training cruise, this time to the eastern Baltic, from 22 November to 2 December.

Kaiser Wilhelm II took part in a pair of training cruises with I Squadron during 9–19 January and 27 February – 16 March 1905. Individual and squadron training followed, with an emphasis on gunnery drills. On 12 July, the fleet began a major training exercise in the North Sea. The fleet then cruised through the Kattegat and stopped in Copenhagen, where Kaiser Wilhelm II was visited by the Danish King Christian IX. The fleet then stopped in Stockholm, where Kaiser Wilhelm II, the battleship Brandenburg, and the armored cruiser Friedrich Carl all ran aground, though only Friedrich Carl was seriously damaged. The summer cruise ended on 9 August, though the autumn maneuvers that would normally have begun shortly thereafter were delayed by a visit from the British Channel Fleet that month. The British fleet stopped in Danzig, Swinemünde, and Flensburg, where it was greeted by units of the German Navy; Kaiser Wilhelm II and the main German fleet was anchored at Swinemünde for the occasion. The visit was strained by the Anglo-German naval arms race.

As a result of the British visit, the 1905 autumn maneuvers were shortened considerably, from 6 to 13 September, and consisted only of exercises in the North Sea. The first exercise presumed a naval blockade in the German Bight, and the second envisioned a hostile fleet attempting to force the defenses of the Elbe. During October, Kaiser Wilhelm II conducted individual training and, in November, joined the rest of I Squadron for a cruise in the Baltic. In early December, I and II Squadrons went on their regular winter cruise, this time to Danzig, where they arrived on 12 December. While on the return trip to Kiel, the fleet conducted tactical exercises.

=== 1906–1914 ===
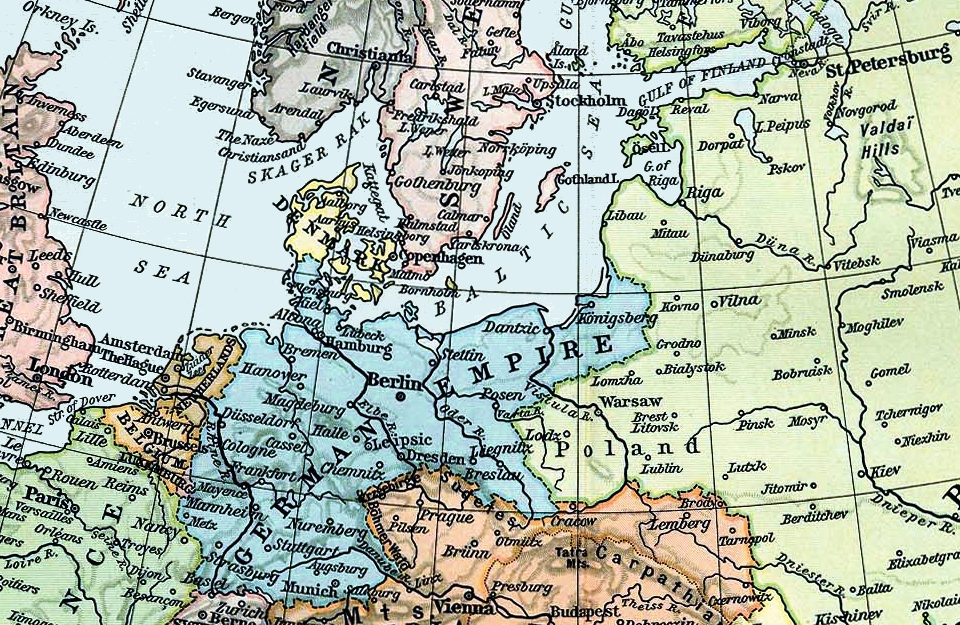
Map of the North and Baltic Seas in 1911

Kaiser Wilhelm II and the rest of the fleet undertook a heavier training schedule in 1906 than in previous years. The ships were occupied with individual, division and squadron exercises throughout April. Starting on 13 May, major fleet exercises took place in the North Sea and lasted until 8 June with a cruise around the Skagen into the Baltic. The fleet began its usual summer cruise to Norway in mid-July. Kaiser Wilhelm II and I Squadron anchored in Molde, where they were joined on 21 July by Wilhelm II aboard the steamer Hamburg. The fleet was present for the birthday of Norwegian King Haakon VII on 3 August. The German ships departed the following day for Helgoland, to join exercises being conducted there. The fleet was back in Kiel by 15 August, where preparations for the autumn maneuvers began. On 22–24 August, the fleet took part in landing exercises in Eckernförde Bay outside Kiel. The maneuvers were paused from 31 August to 3 September when the fleet hosted vessels from Denmark and Sweden, along with a Russian squadron from 3 to 9 September in Kiel. The maneuvers resumed on 8 September and lasted five more days.

On 26 September 1906, now-Großadmiral (Grand Admiral) Koester lowered his flag aboard Kaiser Wilhelm II, ending her tenure as the fleet flagship; the new battleship Deutschland replaced her in this role. Kaiser Wilhelm II was now assigned to I Squadron, where she served as the second command flagship, under Konteradmiral Max Rollmann. The ship participated in the uneventful winter cruise into the Kattegat and Skagerrak from 8 to 16 December. The first quarter of 1907 followed the previous pattern and, on 16 February, the Active Battle Fleet was re-designated the High Seas Fleet. From the end of May to early June the fleet went on its summer cruise in the North Sea, returning to the Baltic via the Kattegat. This was followed by the regular cruise to Norway from 12 July to 10 August, during which Kaiser Wilhelm II anchored in Trondheim. During the autumn maneuvers, which lasted from 26 August to 6 September, the fleet conducted landing exercises in northern Schleswig with IX Corps. The winter training cruise went into the Kattegat from 22 to 30 November.

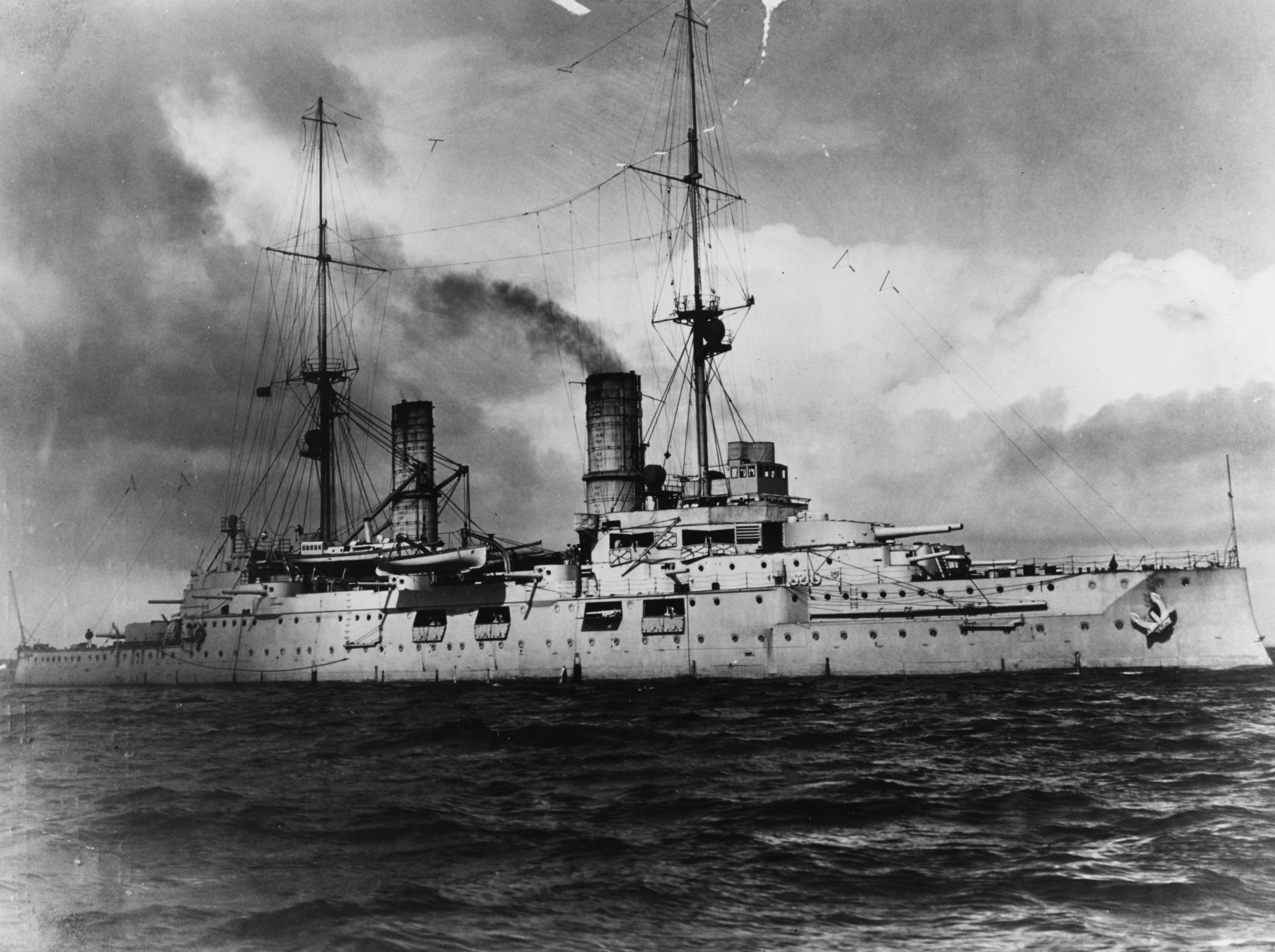
Kaiser Wilhelm in 1910 after the completion of her reconstruction

In May 1908, the fleet went on a major cruise into the Atlantic instead of its normal voyage in the North Sea. Kaiser Wilhelm II stopped in Horta in the Azores. The fleet returned to Kiel on 13 August to prepare for the autumn maneuvers, which lasted from 27 August to 7 September. Division exercises in the Baltic immediately followed from 7 to 13 September. At the conclusion of these maneuvers, Kaiser Wilhelm II was taken out of service. In 1909–1910, she underwent a major reconstruction in Wilhelmshaven. The superstructure amidships was cut down to reduce top-heaviness, new circular funnels were installed, and the conning tower was enlarged. The fighting tops from the masts were removed, and the secondary battery was significantly revised. Four of the 15 cm guns were removed and two 8.8 cm guns were added; most of the 8.8 cm guns were moved from the upper decks into casemates in the main deck. On 14 October 1910, Kaiser Wilhelm II was recommissioned for service in the Baltic reserve division. She underwent short sea trials from 21 to 23 October before proceeding to Kiel, where she was based with her four sister ships.

From 3 to 29 April 1911, the ship participated in maneuvers off Rügen. Together with the North Sea reserve division, Kaiser Wilhelm II and her sister ships went on a training cruise to Norway, starting on 8 June. During the visit, she stopped in Arendal, Bergen, and Odda. In July, the ship conducted gunnery training near the northern coast of Holstein, followed by training cruises off the coast of Mecklenburg. Kaiser Wilhelm II served as the flagship of III Squadron, which was organized for the autumn maneuvers in August. III Squadron was attached to the High Seas Fleet for the maneuvers, which lasted from 28 August to 11 September. The following day, III Squadron was disbanded and Kaiser Wilhelm II returned to service with the Baltic reserve division. In February 1912, Kaiser Wilhelm II was sent to the Fehmarn Belt to assist in freeing several freighters that were stuck in ice. She and her sisters were again decommissioned on 9 May, and remained out of service until 1914.

=== World War I ===
Illustration of Kaiser Wilhelm II

As a result of the outbreak of World War I, Kaiser Wilhelm II and her sisters were brought out of reserve and mobilized as V Battle Squadron on 5 August 1914; Kaiser Wilhelm II served as the flagship of the squadron. The ships were readied for war very slowly, and they were not ready for service in the North Sea until the end of August. They were initially tasked with coastal defense, though they served in this capacity for a very short time. In mid-September, V Squadron was transferred to the Baltic, under the command of Prince Heinrich. He initially planned to launch a major amphibious assault on Windau, but a shortage of transports forced a revision of the plan. Instead, V Squadron was to carry the landing force, but this too was cancelled after Heinrich received false reports of British warships having entered the Baltic on 25 September. Kaiser Wilhelm II and her sisters returned to Kiel the following day, disembarked the landing force, and then proceeded to the North Sea, where they resumed guard ship duties. Before the end of the year, V Squadron was once again transferred to the Baltic.

Prince Heinrich ordered a foray toward Gotland. On 26 December 1914, the battleships rendezvoused with the Baltic cruiser division in the Bay of Pomerania and then departed on the sortie. Two days later, the fleet arrived off Gotland to show the German flag, and was back in Kiel by 30 December. The squadron returned to the North Sea for guard duties, but was withdrawn from front-line service in February 1915. Shortages of trained crews in the High Seas Fleet, coupled with the risk of operating older ships in wartime, necessitated the deactivation of Kaiser Wilhelm II and her sisters. During this period, her sister Kaiser Karl der Grosse briefly served as the squadron flagship, but Kaiser Wilhelm II resumed the post starting on 24 February. The following month, on 5 March, her crew was reduced and she steamed to Wilhelmshaven, where she was converted into the headquarters ship for the commander of the High Seas Fleet, commencing on 26 April. The ship had its wireless equipment modernized for use by the commander when the fleet was in port.

After the end of the war, Kaiser Wilhelm II continued in her role as headquarters ship for the fleet commander and his staff, along with the commander of the minesweeping operation in the North Sea. She was decommissioned for the last time on 10 September 1920. The naval clauses of the Treaty of Versailles, which ended the war, limited the capital ship strength of the re-formed Reichsmarine to eight pre-dreadnought battleships of the Deutschland and Braunschweig classes, of which only six could be operational at any given time. (Note: Treaty of Versailles Section II: Naval Clauses, Article 181.) As a result, Kaiser Wilhelm II was stricken from the navy list on 17 March 1921 and sold to shipbreakers. By 1922, Kaiser Wilhelm II and her sisters had been broken up for scrap metal. The ship's bow ornament (bugzier) is preserved at the Military History Museum of the Bundeswehr in Dresden.
