= Kaiser Friedrich III-class battleship =

Battleship class of the German Imperial Navy

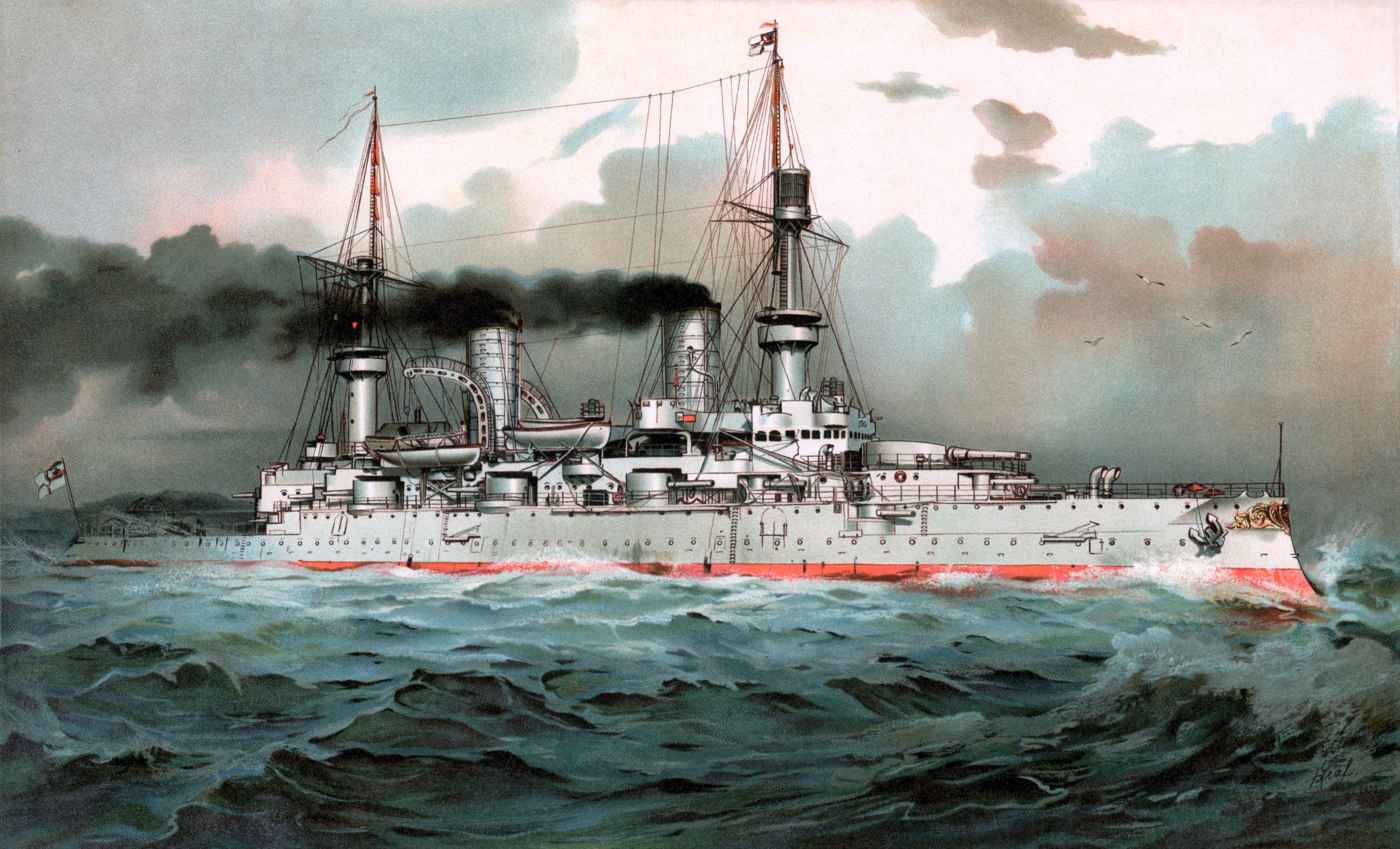
- SMS Kaiser Wilhelm II

Class overview
- Builders: Kaiserliche Werft Wilhelmshaven; Germaniawerft; Blohm & Voss; Schichau-Werke
- Operators: Imperial German Navy
- Preceded by: Brandenburg class
- Succeeded by: Wittelsbach class
- Built: 1895–1901
- In commission: 1898–1920
- Completed: 5
- Scrapped: 5

General characteristics
- Type: Pre-dreadnought battleship
- Displacement: Normal: 11,097 t (10,922 long tons); Full load: 11,785 t (11,599 long tons)
- Length: 125.3 m (411 ft 1 in) o/a
- Beam: 20.4 m (66 ft 11 in)
- Draft: 7.89 m (25 ft 11 in)
- Installed power: 10 or 12 boilers; 13,000 PS (12,820 ihp; 9,560 kW)
- Propulsion: 3 × triple-expansion steam engines; 3 × screw propellers
- Speed: 17.5 knots (32.4 km/h; 20.1 mph)
- Range: 3,420 nmi (6,330 km; 3,940 mi) at 10 knots (19 km/h; 12 mph)
- Complement: 39 officers; 612 enlisted
- Armament: 4 × 24 cm (9.4 in) 40 cal guns; 18 × 15 cm (5.9 in) SK L/40 guns; 12 × 8.8 cm (3.5 in) SK L/30 guns; 12 × 3.7 cm (1.5 in) guns; 6 × 45 cm (17.7 in) torpedo tubes
- Armor: Belt: 300 to 150 mm (11.8 to 5.9 in); Deck: 65 mm (2.6 in); Conning tower: 250 mm (9.8 in); Turrets: 250 mm; Casemates: 150 mm

The Kaiser Friedrich III class consisted of five pre-dreadnought battleships of the Imperial German Navy; all ships of the class were named for German emperors. The ships were Kaiser Friedrich III, Kaiser Wilhelm II, Kaiser Wilhelm der Grosse, Kaiser Barbarossa, and Kaiser Karl der Grosse, all built between 1895 and 1901. The class saw the introduction of the traditional armament layout for German battleships prior to the advent of the dreadnought type of battleship in the early 1900s: four large-caliber guns, but of comparatively smaller size compared to their contemporaries, in two gun turrets. The German adoption of smaller guns was a result of a preference for higher volumes of fire over weight of shell. The Kaiser Friedrich III class also standardized the use of three screws for battleships and introduced water-tube boilers and Krupp cemented armor.

On entering service, the ships were assigned to I Squadron, of which Kaiser Friedrich III served as the flagship, while Kaiser Wilhelm II served as the flagship for the overall fleet commander. The ships conducted routine training exercises and cruises in the early 1900s and Kaiser Friedrich III was badly damaged in a grounding accident while steaming in the Baltic Sea in 1901. As newer battleships entered service later in the decade, the ships of the class were moved to II Squadron in 1905 and all of the ships except Kaiser Karl der Grosse were rebuilt between 1907 and 1910. Thereafter they were reduced to reserve status beginning in 1908, since more powerful dreadnought battleships had begun to be commissioned; the rest of their peacetime careers consisted of periodic reactivations to participate in annual fleet training maneuvers.

At the start of World War I in July 1914, the ships were recommissioned and assigned to V Squadron; they were tasked with coastal defense in the North Sea but were quickly transferred to the Baltic to support German operations against the Russian Empire. They saw limited activity during this period, and they returned to the North Sea for guard duties in early 1915. The increasing threat of modern weapons, particularly the British submarines that had begun to operate in the area, combined with shortages of crews for more valuable vessels, led the navy to decommission all five members of the class in March 1915. They were used in a variety of secondary roles. They were all discarded in the early 1920s as Germany disarmed under the terms of the Treaty of Versailles.

== Design ==
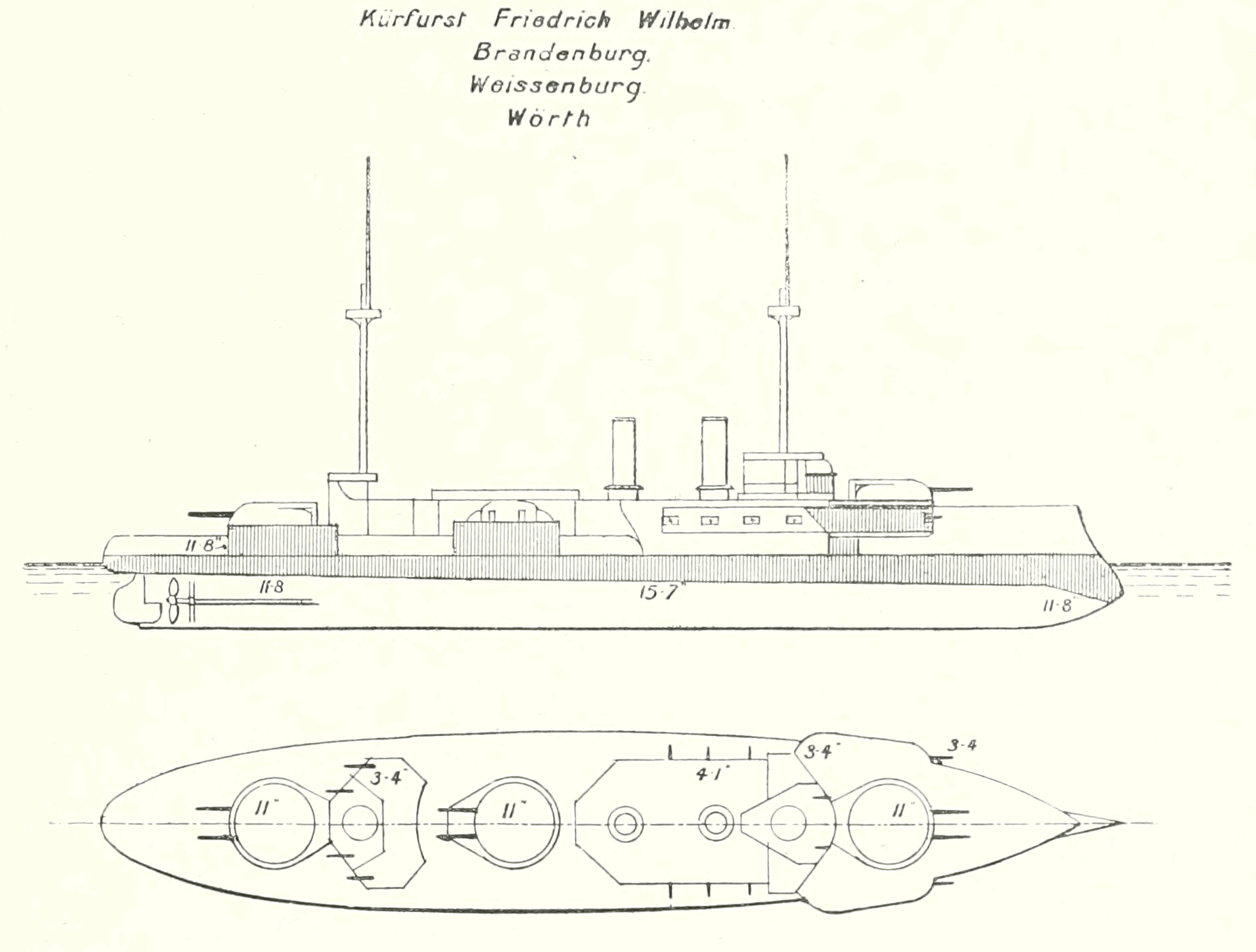
Top and profile drawing of the Brandenburg class; the center turret was not repeated in the Kaiser Friedrich III design

In the early 1890s, the German Navy attempted to secure funding from the Reichstag to replace the elderly ironclad Preussen, but parliamentary resistance delayed the appropriation until the 1894/1895 budget year. Design studies for the new ship had begun in June 1891 at the request of Kaiser Wilhelm II, and it was quickly decided to make significant changes from the preceding Brandenburg-class design. The limitations of the fleet's infrastructure, particularly the dry docks and other harbor facilities, along with the Kaiser Wilhelm Canal then under construction, constrained the size of the new ship. To keep the new ship within the displacement limit, the center turret that had been used on the Brandenburgs would have to be sacrificed if a heavier secondary battery was to be incorporated. Five different design sketches were prepared, the first four incorporating a secondary armament of ten 10.5 cm (4.1 in) guns and eight 8.8 cm (3.5 in) guns and the fifth replacing the 10.5 cm guns with eight 15 cm (5.9 in) guns. All five variants carried a main armament of four 28 cm (11 in) guns. Wilhelm II contributed his own proposal, but it suffered from serious stability problems and was not a serious option.

Work continued on the ships' design while the navy pushed for funding in the Reichstag, which was finally approved in March 1894, placing pressure on the design staff to complete their work so construction could begin. By May, the design staff had produced sketch XVI, which discarded the traditional two-gun turret used by most navies in favor of four single-gun turrets in the lozenge arrangement used in contemporary French battleships like Bouvet. If weight permitted, all four were to be 28 cm guns, but the option to reduce the wing turrets to 21 cm (8.3 in) was available if necessary. The secondary battery was to be sixteen of the 10.5 cm guns, with at least some in twin turrets, but over the following months the battery was increased to 15 cm guns, as it was the accepted view at the time that secondary guns would do the most damage in a close-range fight. This view, which advocated the so-called "hail of fire" principle, was seemingly vindicated by the Japanese cruisers' victory over a more heavily armed Chinese fleet at the Battle of Yalu later in 1894. The smaller, faster-firing guns were intended to inflict serious damage on the superstructures of enemy battleships and demoralize the crew.

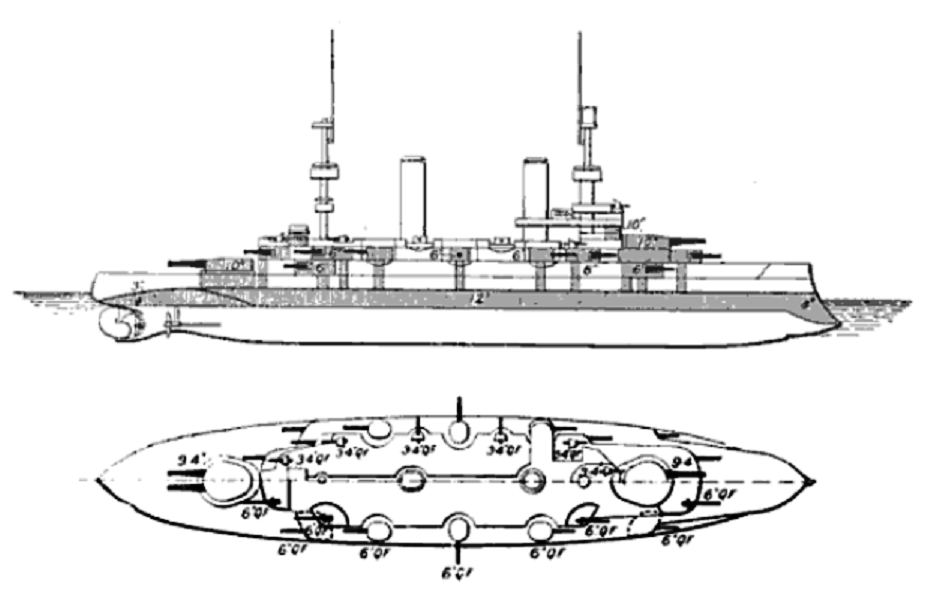
Top and profile drawing of the Kaiser Friedrich III class

During the design process, the commander of the Maneuver Squadron, Hans von Koester, suggested that the 28 cm guns be discarded in favor of 24 cm (9.4 in) guns, since they could be fired 2.5 times as fast as the larger guns and they were large enough that they could still be used to penetrate heavy armor at the close battle ranges envisioned at the time. Koester convinced Wilhelm II to overrule the naval high command, who wished to retain the heavier guns. This decision set a pattern of German naval construction for the next two decades that favored lighter, faster-firing guns instead of larger, more powerful ones. Though the decision was criticized at the time on the basis that the 24 cm gun was smaller and thus weaker than the 28 cm, the larger gun offered little substantive advantage at close range, and the much greater rate of fire allowed it to produce a heavier broadside over time.

In August 1894, the navy settled on an 11,000-metric-ton (11,000-long-ton) ship armed with four 24 cm guns and eighteen 15 cm guns. The decision was a gamble, as Krupp had not actually designed a 24 cm gun, and if the tests had proved to be a failure, the ship would not have had a main battery gun, since her turrets could not be reworked to accommodate the 28 cm gun. The advent of Krupp cemented armor allowed a significant saving of weight, as it was much more effective than traditional Krupp armor, so less armor could be used to achieve the same level of protection. They retained the same armor layout of the Brandenburgs, although the weight savings would have allowed the adoption of a more comprehensive layout that would be used in the subsequent Wittelsbach class. The propulsion system was improved with the adoption of water-tube boilers and reorganized to incorporate a third propeller shaft, which became standard for German capital ships. The navy had concerns about the reliability of the water-tube Thornycroft boilers, so the first vessel, Kaiser Friedrich III, was completed with just four of the new types, with the remaining eight being older fire-tube boilers.

After the first vessel was begun, the next member of the class was authorized for the 1896/1897 program; during the intervening two years, consideration was given to re-designing the second ship to match foreign developments, most significantly the adoption of 30.5 cm (12 in) guns like those on the British Majestic-class battleship. The change would have necessitated halving the main battery and the removal of four of the 15 cm guns to offset the weight of the larger guns. Additionally, it would have left Kaiser Friedrich III with no counterparts, which would have complicated tactical control. The sacrifices were deemed to be too severe, and so the decision was made to go ahead with the 24 cm gun, as successful proof-firing of the new gun had by then been completed.

=== General characteristics and machinery ===
SMS Kaiser Barbarossa as completed, showing the short military masts and small bridge that distinguished the last three members of the class from the first two vessels

The Kaiser Friedrich III-class ships were 120.9 meters (396 ft 8 in) long at the waterline and 125.3 m (411 ft 1 in) overall. They had a beam of 20.4 m (66 ft 11 in) and a draft of 7.89 m (25 ft 11 in) forward and 8.25 m (27 ft 1 in) aft. The ships displaced 11,097 t (10,922 long tons) normally and up to 11,785 metric tons (11,599 long tons) at full load. The ships' steel hulls were of transverse and longitudinal frame construction. The hull contained twelve watertight compartments and a double bottom that covered 70 percent of the hull. Kaiser Friedrich III was completed with a tall military mast for her foremast and a pole mainmast. The other four vessels were fitted with short military masts for both masts. In 1901, Kaiser Friedrich III's foremast was shortened. Kaiser Friedrich III and Kaiser Wilhelm II, both intended to serve as flagships, were completed with large bridges, with a two-story bridge aboard the former and a single-story bridge on the latter. The remaining three vessels received smaller, open bridges.

The German navy regarded them as having excellent seakeeping. They had a tight turning circle and were very responsive. The ships rolled up to 15° and had a roll period of 12 seconds. They suffered only minor speed loss in heavy seas, but up to 40 percent with the rudder hard over. Their metacentric heights were between 0.917 to 1.18 m (3 ft 0 in to 3 ft 10 in). The ships carried a number of smaller boats, including two picket boats, two launches, one pinnace, two cutters, two yawls, and two dinghies. The crew numbered 39 officers and 612 enlisted men. When serving as a squadron flagship, a ship had its crew augmented by another 12 officers and between 51 and 63 enlisted men.

The Kaiser Friedrich III-class battleships were powered by three 3-cylinder vertical triple-expansion steam engines that drove three screws. Kaiser Friedrich III, Kaiser Barbarossa, and Kaiser Wilhelm der Grosse were equipped with three 3-bladed screws that were 4.5 m (14 ft 9 in) in diameter. Kaiser Karl der Grosse and Kaiser Wilhelm II were equipped with two of the 3-bladed screws on the outer shafts and a four-bladed screw that was 4.2 m (13 ft 9 in) in diameter on the center shaft. The ships received different boiler arrangements owing to concerns among the naval high command about the reliability of the new water-tube boilers. Kaiser Wilhelm II had an arrangement similar to Kaiser Friedrich III, except the Thornycroft boilers were replaced by Marine-type fire-tube boilers. Kaiser Wilhelm der Grosse and Kaiser Karl der Grosse were equipped with four Marine and six cylindrical fire-tube boilers, while Kaiser Barbarossa had four Thornycroft and six cylindrical fire-tube boilers. All of the ships' boilers were ducted into two funnels, but Kaiser Friedrich III and Kaiser Wilhelm II had thinner aft funnels while those of the other three ships were identical.

The powerplants were rated at 13,000 metric horsepower (12,820 ihp; 9,560 kW), but on trials could produce up to 13,950 metric horsepower (13,760 ihp; 10,260 kW). This generated a top speed of 17.5 knots (32.4 km/h; 20.1 mph). The ships carried 650 metric tons (640 long tons) of coal, although the use of additional spaces within the ships increased fuel capacity to 1,070 metric tons (1,050 long tons). This provided a maximum range of 3,420 nautical miles (6,330 km; 3,940 mi) at a cruising speed of 10 knots (19 km/h; 12 mph). Electrical power was supplied by five 320 kW 74 volt generators in Kaiser Friedrich III and Kaiser Wilhelm II, and four 240 kW 74 volt generators in the other three ships.

=== Armament ===
Forward guns on one of the Kaiser Friedrich III-class ships

The primary armament consisted of a battery of four 24 cm (9.4 in) SK L/40 guns in twin-gun turrets, (Note: In Imperial German Navy gun nomenclature, "SK" (Schnelladekanone) denotes that the gun is quick firing, while the L/40 denotes the length of the gun. In this case, the L/40 gun is 40 caliber, meaning that the gun is 40 times as long as it is in diameter.) one fore and one aft of the central superstructure. The guns were mounted in hydraulically operated C/98 turrets, which allowed elevation to +30 degrees and depression to −5 degrees. At maximum elevation, the guns could hit targets out to 16,900 meters (18,500 yd). The guns fired 140-kilogram (310 lb) shells at a muzzle velocity of 835 meters per second (2,740 ft/s). Each gun was supplied with 75 shells, for a total of 300.

Secondary armament included eighteen 15 cm (5.9 inch) SK L/40 guns. Six were mounted in single turrets amidships and the rest were mounted in MPL casemates; all were manually operated and elevated. (Note: MPL stands for Mittel-Pivot-Lafette (Central pivot mounting).) Most of these guns were mounted at upper-deck level, with only four of the casemates at main deck level, which kept them high enough in the ship to avoid a common problem with battleships of the period where heavy seas could make the guns unworkable. According to the historian Aidan Dodson, the arrangement was "perhaps the best of the period." These guns fired armor-piercing shells at a rate of 4 to 5 per minute. The ships carried 120 shells per gun, for a total of 2,160 rounds total. The guns could depress to −7 degrees and elevate to +20 degrees, for a maximum range of 13,700 m (14,990 yd). The shells weighed 51 kg (112 lb) and were fired at a muzzle velocity of 735 m/s (2,410 ft/s).

The ships also carried twelve 8.8 cm (3.45 in) SK L/30 quick-firing guns for defense against torpedo boats, also mounted individually in casemates and pivot mounts. These guns were supplied with between 170 and 250 shells per gun. These guns fired 7.04 kg (15.5 lb) shell at a muzzle velocity of 590 mps (1,936 fps). Their rate of fire was approximately 15 shells per minute; the guns could engage targets out to 6,890 m (7,530 yd). The gun mounts were manually operated. The ships' gun armament was rounded out by twelve 3.7 cm (1.5 in) Maxim machine cannon.

The ships were also armed with six 45 cm (17.7 in) torpedo tubes, all in above-water swivel mounts. Four tubes were mounted on the sides of the ship, another in the bow, and the last in the stern. These weapons were 5.1 m (201 in) long and carried an 87.5 kg (193 lb) TNT warhead. They could be set at two speeds for different ranges. At 26 knots (48 km/h; 30 mph), the torpedoes had a range of 800 m (870 yd). At an increased speed of 32 knots (59 km/h; 37 mph), the range was reduced to 500 m (550 yd).

=== Armor ===
The Kaiser Friedrich III-class ships were armored with steel produced by Krupp. They were the last German capital ships to use the old-style narrow armor belt arrangement; older compound armor required a significant amount of steel to resist large-caliber shellfire, which meant that little of the ship could be covered with armor owing to its weight. Krupp's new steel was much stronger, but the design staff did not take advantage of the reduced weight to provide more comprehensive protection, which would arrive with the subsequent Wittelsbach class.

They had an armor belt that was 300 millimeters (11.8 in) thick in the central portion of the hull at the waterline. It tapered to 150 mm (5.9 in) in the forward section and 200 mm (7.9 in) in the rear, although the belt did not extend fully aft. The lower portion of the belt ranged in thickness from 100 to 180 mm (3.9 to 7.1 in). The entire belt was backed with 250 mm (9.8 in) of teak. The main armored deck was 65 mm (2.6 in) thick, but the thickness was increased to 75 mm (3 in) aft of the rear main battery barbette, where the stern was not protected by the belt. This portion of the deck curved down at the sides to offer a measure of protection against shell hits.

The conning tower was protected by armored sides that were 250 mm thick and a roof that was 30 mm (1.2 in) thick. Each main-battery turret had a 50 mm (2 in) thick roof and 250 mm thick sides. The 15 cm guns mounted in turrets were protected by 150 mm thick sides and 70 mm (2.8 in) thick gun shields. Those in the casemates also had 150 mm worth of armor protection.

== Construction ==
Kaiser Wilhelm der Grosse at her launching

The five ships of the Kaiser Friedrich class were built by a combination of government and private shipyards. Three of the ships—Kaiser Friedrich III, Kaiser Wilhelm der Grosse, and Kaiser Karl der Grosse—were delayed during construction; Kaiser Friedrich III had to wait for her main guns to be completed before entering service. Kaiser Karl der Grosse was damaged by an accidental grounding by the shipyard crew when they were moving the ship from Hamburg to Wilhelmshaven, and a fire at the shipyard slowed work on Kaiser Wilhelm der Grosse.

Construction data
Ship	Contract name	Builder	Namesake	Laid down	Launched	Commissioned
Kaiser Friedrich III	Ersatz Preussen	Kaiserliche Werft, Wilhelmshaven	Kaiser Friedrich III	5 March 1895	1 July 1896	7 October 1898
Kaiser Wilhelm II	Ersatz Friedrich der Grosse	Kaiserliche Werft, Wilhelmshaven	Kaiser Wilhelm II	26 October 1896	14 September 1897	13 February 1900
Kaiser Wilhelm der Grosse	Ersatz König Wilhelm	Germaniawerft, Kiel	Kaiser Wilhelm I	22 January 1898	1 June 1899	5 May 1901
Kaiser Karl der Grosse	B	Blohm & Voss, Hamburg	Emperor Charlemagne	17 September 1898	18 October 1899	4 February 1902
Kaiser Barbarossa	A	Schichau-Werke, Danzig	Emperor Frederick I	3 August 1898	21 April 1900	10 June 1901

== Service history ==
=== Prewar careers ===
Lithograph of Kaiser Friedrich III in 1902

On entering service, Kaiser Friedrich III became the flagship of Prince Heinrich, the commander of I Squadron of the Home Fleet. Kaiser Wilhelm II became the flagship of Koester, the fleet commander. The two ships operated together into early 1901 until Kaiser Friedrich III was badly damaged in a grounding accident while cruising in the Baltic Sea in April. An investigation revealed several uncharted rocks and faulted the lightship in the area, which was out of position. While she was out of service for repairs, her crew was transferred to Kaiser Wilhelm der Grosse, which had just been completed. Over the course of the next four years, the ships of the class operated together in I Squadron, conducting training cruises, fleet maneuvers every August and September, and visits to foreign ports.

By 1905, as several new classes of battleships—the Wittelsbach, Braunschweig, and Deutschland classes—had either entered service or were approaching completion, the members of the Kaiser Friedrich III class began to be transferred to II Squadron. In 1906, Kaiser Wilhelm II was replaced as the fleet flagship by the new battleship Deutschland. The normal peacetime training routine continued for the next several years, interrupted by a reconstruction program in the mid to late-1900s. Kaiser Barbarossa was the first to be rebuilt in 1905, a result of having been decommissioned for repairs to her rudder for damage incurred on a cruise to Spain in 1903. Kaiser Friedrich III was rebuilt in 1907, Kaiser Wilhelm II and Kaiser Wilhelm der Grosse were reconstructed in 1909–1910. The work involved cutting down their superstructure to reduce topweight, removing four of the 15 cm guns and one of the torpedo tubes, and moving the 8.8 cm guns to the upper deck. Kaiser Karl der Grosse was not modernized, however.

Beginning in 1908, the members of the class transitioned out of front-line service, their place having been taken by the Deutschland class and the first dreadnought battleships of the Nassau class. Kaiser Karl der Grosse was the first to be moved to the Reserve Squadron in 1908, followed by Kaiser Barbarossa and Kaiser Friedrich III in 1909 and Kaiser Wilhelm II and Kaiser Wilhelm der Grosse the next year. For the rest of their peacetime careers, they spent much of the year out of service but were reactivated for the annual fleet maneuvers every August and September. For the exercises, they formed III Squadron, with Kaiser Wilhelm II serving as the squadron flagship.

=== World War I ===
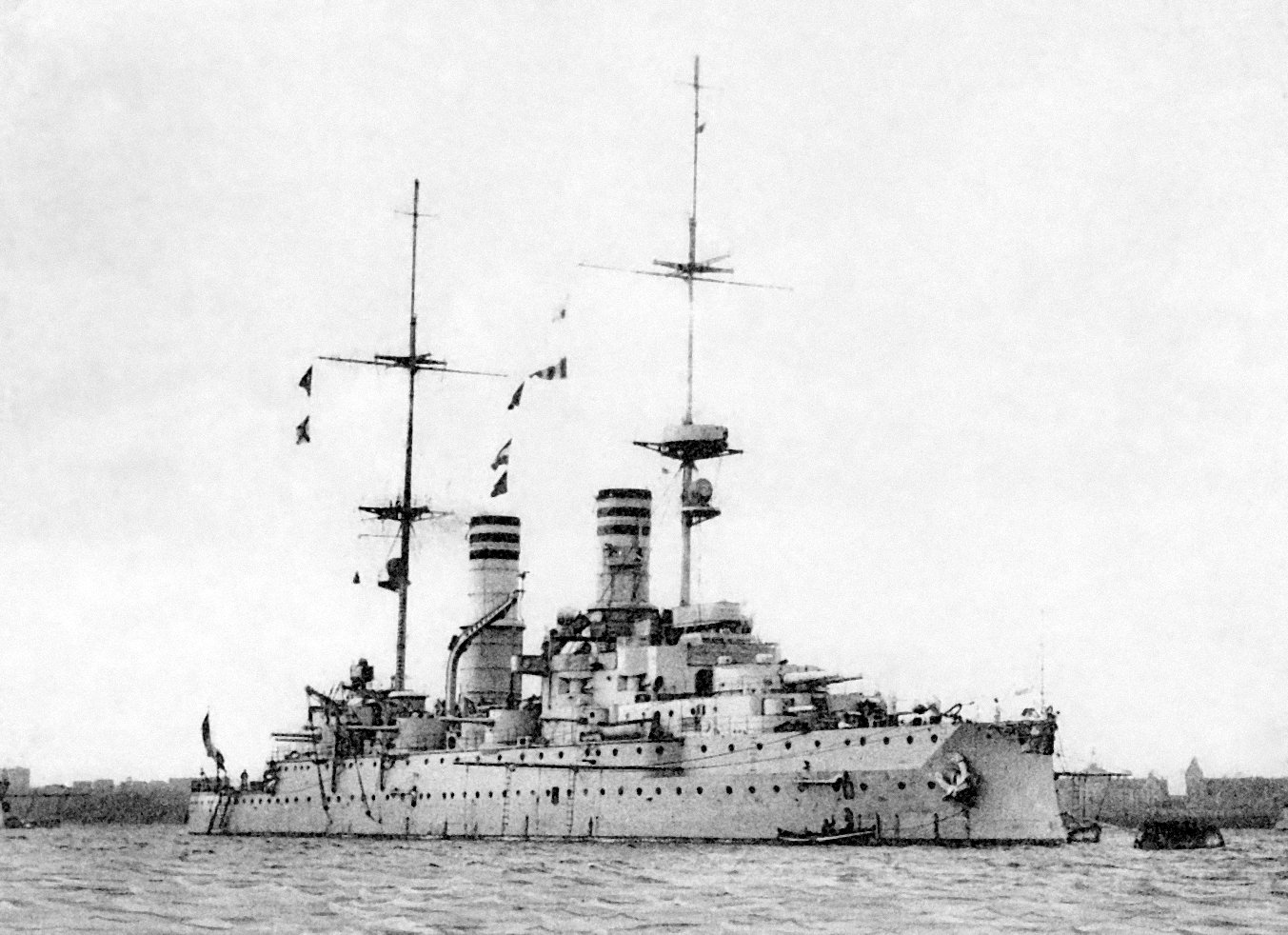
Kaiser Barbarossa after her reconstruction

Following the outbreak of World War I in July 1914, the five Kaiser Friedrich III-class ships were reactivated to form V Battle Squadron, with Kaiser Wilhelm II again as the flagship. They served briefly in a coastal-defense role in the North Sea before being transferred to the Baltic in September for operations against the Russian Empire. They were slated to carry an amphibious assault force to Windau in late September, but false rumors of British warships having entered the Baltic led to the operation being cancelled. They made a sweep into the northern Baltic in December but did not encounter any Russian warships. In January 1915, they were moved back to the North Sea for guard duties, but they were quickly decommissioned the next month. The ships were by then thoroughly obsolete and were far too vulnerable to modern weapons, particularly the British submarines that had begun operating in the Baltic. In addition, the navy was facing severe crew shortages and decided that older vessels of limited combat use like the Kaiser Friedrich III class could not be maintained in service.

On 5 March, the ships were dispersed to various ports, had their crews reduced, and were eventually disarmed. Kaiser Wilhelm II was stationed in Wilhelmshaven as a headquarters ship for the commander of the High Seas Fleet, a role she continued to fill after the war. Kaiser Karl der Grosse was used briefly as an engine-room training ship before being converted into a prison ship; Kaiser Friedrich III and Kaiser Barbarossa also served as floating prisons in Kiel and Wilhelmshaven, respectively. Kaiser Wilhelm der Grosse became a depot ship before being relegated to a torpedo target ship in 1916. The guns taken from the ships were used as coastal artillery in the North Frisian and East Frisian Islands in the North Sea and to guard Libau in the Baltic. All five ships were broken up between 1920 and 1922 after the end of the war to ensure Germany complied with the naval disarmament clauses of the Treaty of Versailles. The bow ornaments from Kaiser Friedrich III and Kaiser Wilhelm II are preserved at the Militärhistorisches Museum der Bundeswehr in Dresden.
