= SMS Kaiser Karl der Grosse =

Battleship of the German Imperial Navy

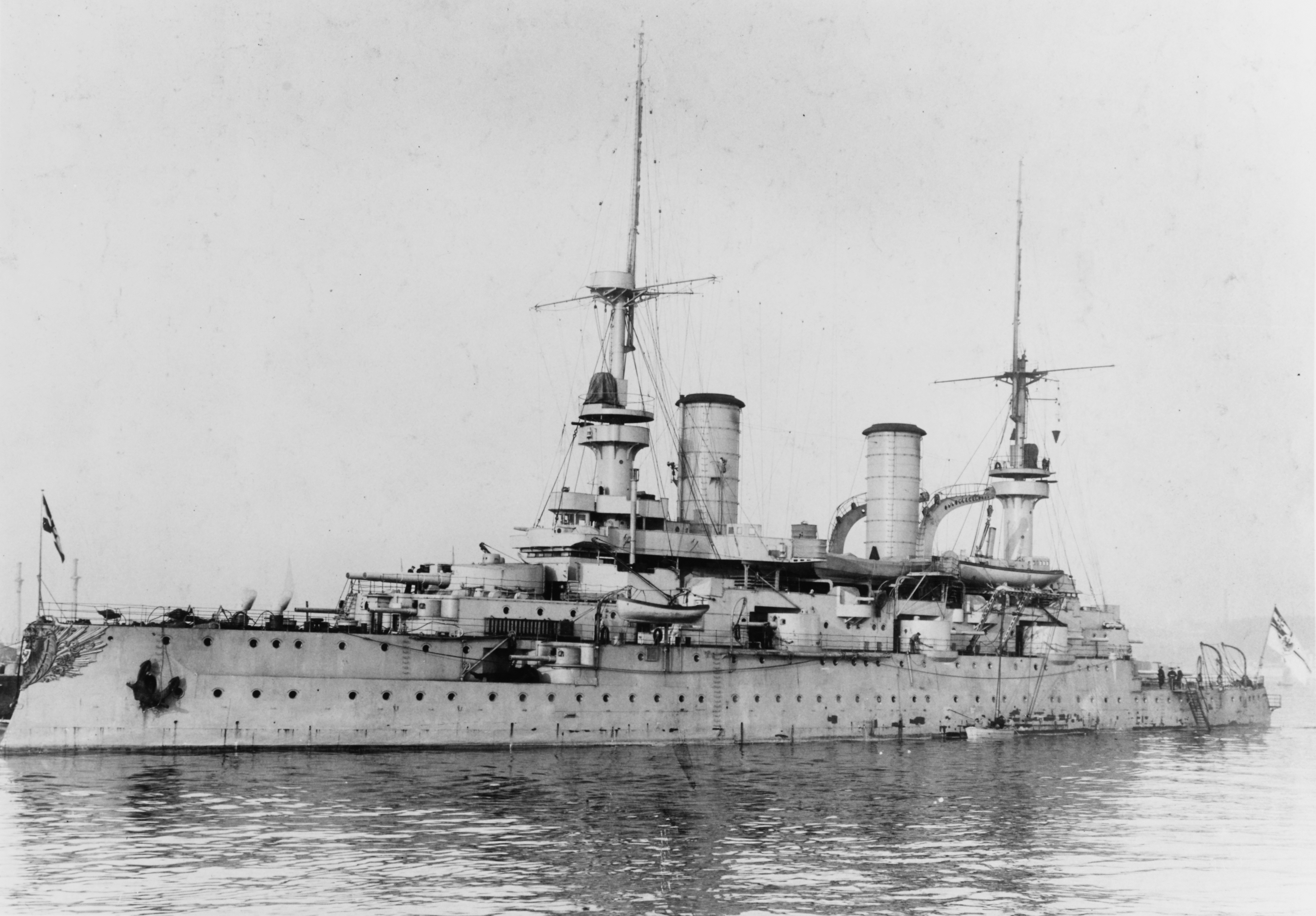
- Kaiser Karl der Grosse in 1902

History

German Empire
- Name: Kaiser Karl der Grosse
- Namesake: Charlemagne (Karl der Grosse in German)
- Builder: Blohm & Voss, Hamburg
- Laid down: 17 September 1898
- Launched: 18 October 1899
- Commissioned: 4 February 1902
- Decommissioned: 19 November 1915
- Stricken: 6 December 1919
- Fate: Scrapped in 1920

General characteristics
- Class & type: Kaiser Friedrich III-class battleship
- Displacement: Normal: 11,097 t (10,922 long tons); Full load: 11,785 t (11,599 long tons)
- Length: 125.3 m (411 ft 1 in)
- Beam: 20.4 m (66 ft 11 in)
- Draft: 7.89 m (25 ft 11 in)
- Installed power: 12 × water-tube boilers; 13,000 PS (12,820 ihp; 9,560 kW)
- Propulsion: 3 × triple-expansion steam engines; 3 × screw propellers
- Speed: 17.5 knots (32.4 km/h; 20.1 mph)
- Range: 3,420 nmi (6,330 km; 3,940 mi) at 10 knots (19 km/h; 12 mph)
- Complement: 39 officers; 612 enlisted
- Armament: 4 × 24 cm (9.4 in) 40 cal guns; 18 × 15 cm (5.9 in) SK L/40 guns; 12 × 8.8 cm (3.5 in) SK L/30 guns; 12 × 3.7 cm (1.5 in) machine cannon; 6 × 45 cm (17.7 in) torpedo tubes
- Armor: Belt: 300 to 150 mm (11.8 to 5.9 in); Deck: 65 mm (2.6 in); Conning Tower: 250 mm (9.8 in); Turrets: 250 mm; Casemates: 150 mm

SMS Kaiser Karl der Grosse (Note: "SMS" stands for "Seiner Majestät Schiff" (German: His Majesty's Ship).) was a German pre-dreadnought battleship of the Kaiser Friedrich III class, built around the turn of the 20th century for the Kaiserliche Marine (Imperial Navy). (Note: In German, the ship's name is rendered with an eszett, as Kaiser Karl der Große. Most English-language sources replace the eszett.) Named for the Emperor Charlemagne, Kaiser Karl der Grosse was built in Hamburg, at the Blohm and Voss shipyard. She was laid down in September 1898 and launched in October 1899. A shipyard strike and an accidental grounding delayed her completion until February 1902; she was therefore the last member of her class to enter service. The ship was armed with four 24-centimeter (9.4 in) guns in two twin gun turrets and had a top speed of 17.5 knots (32.4 km/h; 20.1 mph).

Kaiser Karl der Grosse served with the active fleet until 1908, participating in the normal peacetime routine of training cruises and fleet maneuvers. By 1908, the new "all-big-gun" dreadnought battleships were entering service. As these rendered her obsolete, Kaiser Karl der Grosse was withdrawn from active service and placed in the Reserve Division. At the outbreak of World War I in August 1914, the ship was placed back in active duty as a coastal defense ship in V Battle Squadron, though by February 1915 she was again placed in reserve. Kaiser Karl der Grosse was briefly used as a training ship and ended her career as a prison ship for prisoners of war in Wilhelmshaven. After the German defeat in November 1918, she was sold to ship-breakers and scrapped in 1920.

== Design ==
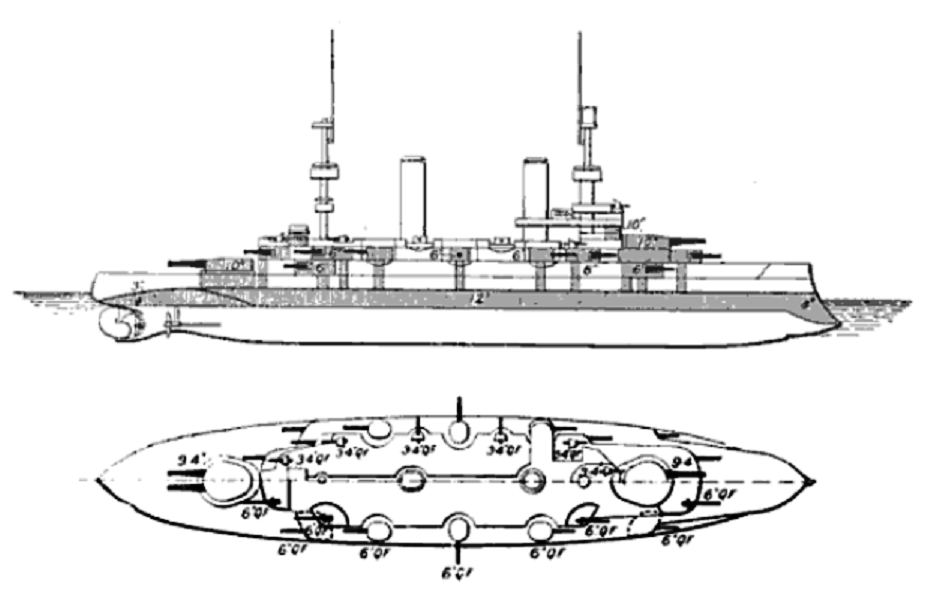
Plan and profile drawing of the Kaiser Friedrich III class

After the German Kaiserliche Marine (Imperial Navy) ordered the four Brandenburg-class battleships in 1889, a combination of budgetary constraints, opposition in the Reichstag (Imperial Diet), and a lack of a coherent fleet plan delayed the acquisition of further battleships. The former Secretary of the Reichsmarineamt (Imperial Navy Office), Leo von Caprivi became the Chancellor of Germany in 1890, and Vizeadmiral (Vice Admiral) Friedrich von Hollmann became the new Secretary of the Reichsmarineamt. Hollmann requested the first Kaiser Friedrich III-class pre-dreadnought battleship in 1892, but the Franco-Russian Alliance, signed the year before, put the government's attention on expanding the Army's budget. Parliamentary opposition forced Hollmann to delay until the following year, when Caprivi spoke in favor of the project, noting that Russia's recent naval expansion threatened Germany's Baltic Sea coastline. In late 1893, Hollmann presented the Navy's estimates for the 1894–1895 budget year, and now the Reichstag approved the new ship, and over the following three years, he secured approval for two further ships. In June 1897, Hollmann was replaced by Konteradmiral (Rear Admiral) Alfred von Tirpitz, who quickly proposed and secured approval for the first Naval Law in early 1898. The law authorized the last two ships of the class, Kaiser Karl der Grosse and Kaiser Barbarossa.

Kaiser Karl der Grosse was 125.3 m (411 ft 1 in) long overall and had a beam of 20.4 m (66 ft 11 in) and a draft of 7.89 m (25 ft 11 in) forward and 8.25 m (27 ft 1 in) aft. She displaced 11,097 t (10,922 long tons) as designed and up to 11,785 t (11,599 long tons) at full load. The ship was powered by three 3-cylinder vertical triple-expansion steam engines, each driving one screw propeller. Steam was provided by four Marine-type and eight cylindrical boilers, all of which burned coal and were vented through a pair of tall funnels. Kaiser Karl der Grosse's powerplant was rated at 13,000 metric horsepower (12,822 ihp; 9,561 kW), which generated a top speed of 17.5 knots (32.4 km/h; 20.1 mph). She had a cruising radius of 3,420 nautical miles (6,330 km; 3,940 mi) at a speed of 10 knots (19 km/h; 12 mph). She had a normal complement of 39 officers and 612 enlisted men.

The ship's armament consisted of a main battery of four 24 cm (9.4 in) SK L/40 guns in twin gun turrets, (Note: In Imperial German Navy gun nomenclature, "SK" (Schnelladekanone) denotes that the gun is quick firing, while the L/40 denotes the length of the gun. In this case, the L/40 gun is 40 caliber, meaning that the gun is 40 times as long as it is in diameter.) one fore and one aft of the central superstructure. Her secondary armament consisted of eighteen 15 cm (5.9 inch) SK L/40 guns carried in a mix of turrets and casemates. Close-range defense against torpedo boats was provided by a battery of twelve 8.8 cm (3.5 in) SK L/30 quick-firing guns all mounted in casemates and twelve 3.7 cm (1.5 in) machine cannon in single mounts. The armament suite was rounded out with six 45 cm (17.7 in) torpedo tubes, all in above-water swivel mounts. The ship's belt armor was 300 mm (11.8 in) thick, and the main armor deck was 65 mm (2.6 in) thick. The conning tower and main battery turrets were protected with 250 mm (9.8 in) of armor plating, and the secondary casemates received 150 mm (5.9 in) of armor protection.

== Service history ==
=== Construction through 1904 ===
Kaiser Karl der Grosse having her 24 cm SK L/40 guns installed

German Emperor (Kaiser) Wilhelm II believed that a strong navy was necessary for the country to expand its influence outside continental Europe. As a result, he initiated a program of naval expansion in the late 1880s; the first battleships built under this program were the four Brandenburg-class ships. These were immediately followed by the five Kaiser Friedrich III-class battleships, of which Kaiser Karl der Grosse was a member. She was ordered under the contract name "B" as a new ship of the fleet. (Note: German warships were ordered under provisional names. Additions to the fleet were given a single letter; ships intended to replace older or lost vessels were ordered as "Ersatz (name of the ship to be replaced)".) The ship's keel was laid down on 17 September 1898 at the Blohm & Voss in Hamburg under yard number 136. She was the first capital ship to be built by the yard and the second warship of any type. The new battleship was launched on 18 October 1899 and named for Charlemagne (Karl der Grosse in German); Wilhelm II gave the launching speech and Johann Georg Mönckeberg, the Erster Bürgermeister (First Mayor) of Hamburg, christened the ship. A major strike by shipyard workers in late 1900 significantly delayed completion of the ship. In October 1901, a shipyard crew took the ship to the naval base at Wilhelmshaven, though while en route she ran aground in the lower Elbe river. The hull was damaged in the incident and the necessary repairs further delayed her entry into service; she was not commissioned until 4 February 1902.

Kaiser Karl der Grosse was assigned to II Division of I Squadron on 19 February, the last member of her class to enter active service. With the assignment of Kaiser Karl der Grosse, I Squadron was now fully composed of modern battleships. The squadron went on a training cruise to Britain in April and May, followed by a tour of the Kiel Week sailing regatta in late June. The ships then took part in another training cruise to Norway in July and then the autumn maneuvers, which began in the Baltic on 31 August. During the exercises, Kaiser Karl der Grosse was assigned to the "hostile" force, as were several of her sister ships. The "hostile" force was first tasked with preventing the "German" squadron from passing through the Great Belt in the Baltic. Kaiser Karl der Grosse and several other battleships were then tasked with forcing an entry into the mouth of the Elbe River, where the Kaiser Wilhelm Canal and Hamburg could be seized. The "hostile" flotilla accomplished these tasks within three days. The maneuvers concluded in the North Sea with a fleet review in the Jade Bight. From 1 to 12 December, the squadron went on its normal winter cruise to Norway.

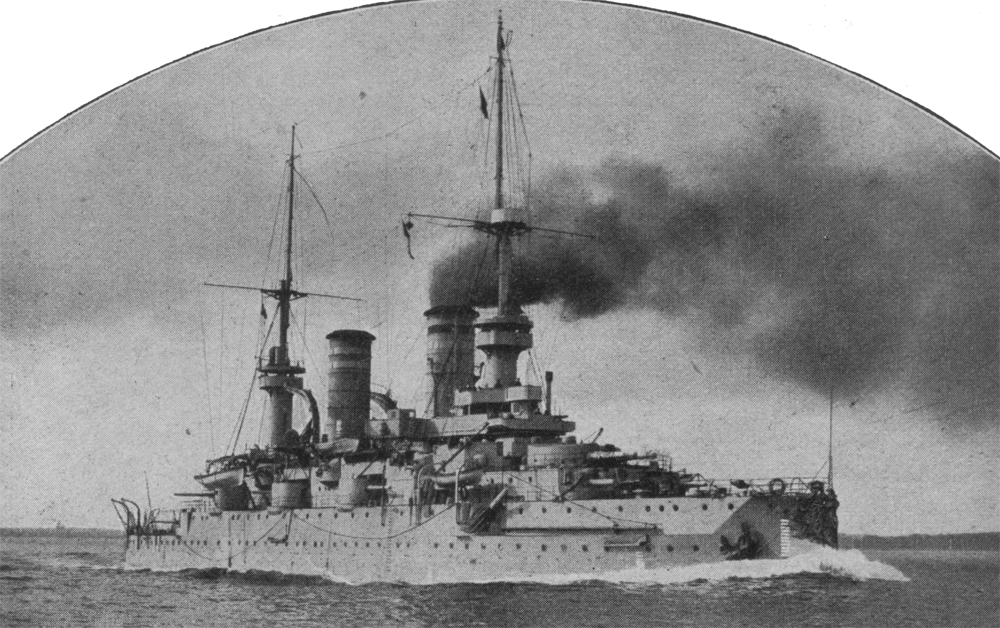
Kaiser Karl der Grosse underway, c. 1902

In 1903, the fleet, which was composed of only one squadron of battleships (along with its attendant scouting vessels and torpedo boats), was reorganized as the "Active Battle Fleet." Kaiser Karl der Grosse remained in I Squadron along with her sister ships and the newest Wittelsbach-class battleships, while the older Brandenburg-class ships were placed in reserve in order to be rebuilt. The first quarter of 1903 followed the usual pattern of training exercises. The squadron went on a training cruise in the Baltic, followed by a voyage to Spain that lasted from 7 May to 10 June. In July, she joined I Squadron for the annual cruise to Norway. The autumn maneuvers consisted of a blockade exercise in the North Sea, a cruise of the entire fleet first to Norwegian waters and then to Kiel in early September, and finally a mock attack on Kiel. The exercises concluded on 12 September. The winter training cruise began on 23 November in the eastern Baltic and continued into the Skagerrak in early December.

Kaiser Karl der Grosse participated in exercises in the Skagerrak from 11 to 21 January 1904, with her squadron from 8 to 17 March, and with the fleet in the North Sea in May. In July, I Squadron and I Scouting Group visited Britain, including a stop at Plymouth on 10 July. The German fleet departed on 13 July, bound for the Netherlands; I Squadron anchored in Vlissingen the following day, where the ships were visited by Queen Wilhelmina. Departing on 20 July for a cruise in the northern North Sea with the rest of the fleet, the squadron stopped in Molde, Norway, nine days later while the other units went to other ports. The fleet reassembled on 6 August and steamed back to Kiel, where it conducted a mock attack on the harbor on 12 August. Immediately after returning to Kiel, the fleet began preparations for the autumn maneuvers, which began on 29 August in the Baltic. The fleet moved to the North Sea on 3 September, where it took part in a major landing operation, after which the ships took the ground troops from IX Corps that participated in the exercises to Altona for a parade for Wilhelm II. The ships then conducted their own parade for the Kaiser off the island of Helgoland on 6 September. Three days later, the fleet returned to the Baltic via the Kaiser Wilhelm Canal, where it participated in further landing operations with IX Corps and the Guards Corps. On 15 September, the maneuvers came to an end. I Squadron went on its winter training cruise, this time to the eastern Baltic, from 22 November to 2 December.

=== 1905–1914 ===
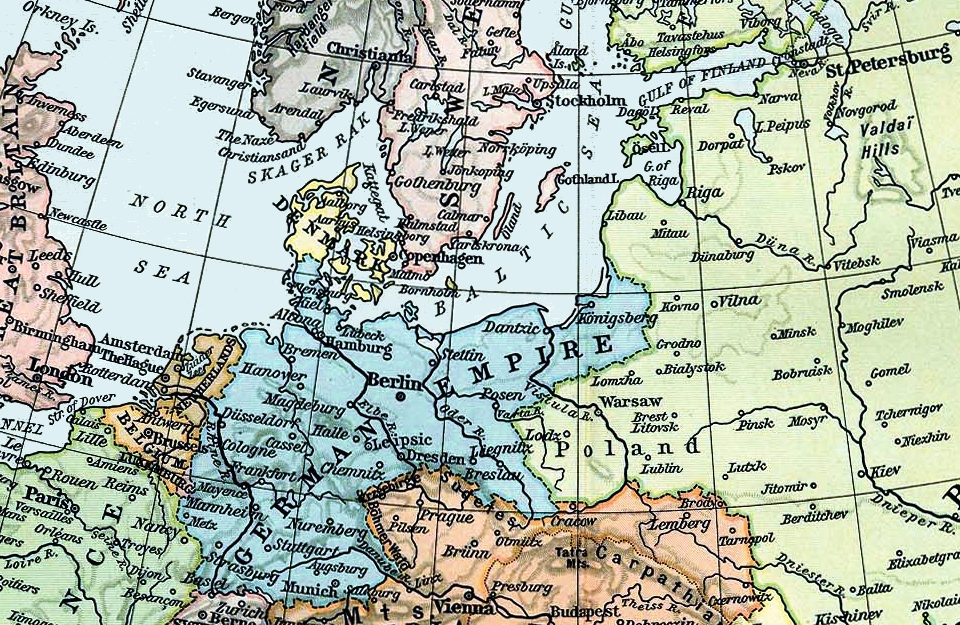
Map of the North and Baltic Seas in 1911

In January and February 1905, Kaiser Karl der Grosse served briefly as the flagship of the squadron. During this period, she took part in a pair of training cruises with I Squadron during 9–19 January and 27 February – 16 March 1905. Individual and squadron training followed, with an emphasis on gunnery drills. On 12 July, the fleet began a major training exercise in the North Sea. While on the cruise on 18 July, Kaiser Karl der Grosse was detached to visit Antwerp to represent Germany during the celebrations for the 75th anniversary of the Belgian Revolution. The rest of the fleet then cruised through the Kattegat and stopped in Copenhagen and Stockholm; Kaiser Karl der Grosse rejoined them on 3 August in Karlskrona. The summer cruise ended on 9 August, though the autumn maneuvers that would normally have begun shortly thereafter were delayed by a visit from the British Channel Fleet that month.

The British fleet stopped in Danzig, Swinemünde, and Flensburg, where it was greeted by units of the German Navy; Kaiser Karl der Grosse and the main German fleet was anchored at Swinemünde for the occasion. The visit was strained by the growing Anglo-German naval arms race. As a result of the British visit, the 1905 autumn maneuvers (6 to 13 September) were shortened considerably, consisting only of exercises in the North Sea. The first exercise presumed a naval blockade in the German Bight, and the second envisioned a hostile fleet attempting to force the defenses of the Elbe. In November, I Squadron cruised in the Baltic. In early December, I and II Squadrons went on their regular winter cruise, this time to Danzig, where they arrived on 12 December. While on the return trip to Kiel, the fleet conducted tactical exercises.

The fleet undertook a heavier training schedule in 1906 than in previous years. The ships were occupied with individual, division and squadron exercises throughout April. Starting on 13 May, major fleet exercises took place in the North Sea and lasted until 8 June with a cruise around the Skagen into the Baltic. The fleet began its usual summer cruise to Norway in mid-July. Kaiser Karl der Grosse and I Squadron anchored in Molde, where they were joined on 21 July by Wilhelm II aboard the steamer Hamburg. The fleet was present for the birthday of Norwegian king Haakon VII on 3 August. The German ships departed the following day for Helgoland to join exercises being conducted there, arriving back in Kiel by 15 August, where preparations for the autumn maneuvers began. On 22–24 August, the fleet took part in landing exercises in Eckernförde Bay outside Kiel. The maneuvers were paused from 31 August to 3 September when Kiel hosted vessels from Denmark and Sweden, along with a Russian squadron from 3 to 9 September. The maneuvers resumed on 8 September and lasted five more days. The ship participated in the uneventful winter cruise into the Kattegat and Skagerrak from 8 to 16 December.

The first quarter of 1907 followed the previous pattern and, on 16 February, the Active Battlefleet was re-designated the High Seas Fleet. From the end of May to early June the fleet went on its summer cruise in the North Sea, returning to the Baltic via the Kattegat. This was followed by the regular cruise to Norway from 12 July to 10 August. During the autumn maneuvers, which lasted from 26 August to 6 September, the fleet conducted landing exercises in northern Schleswig with IX Corps. The winter training cruise went into the Kattegat from 22 to 30 November. In May 1908, the fleet went on a major cruise into the Atlantic instead of its normal voyage in the North Sea. The fleet returned to Kiel on 13 August to prepare for the autumn maneuvers, which lasted from 27 August to 7 September. Division exercises in the Baltic immediately followed from 7 to 13 September. Following the conclusion of these maneuvers, Kaiser Karl der Grosse was decommissioned in Kiel on 18 September and assigned to the Reserve Division in the Baltic. During this period, her sister ships were rebuilt, though Kaiser Karl der Grosse did not receive this treatment. By this time, the new "all-big-gun" battleships, which rendered pre-dreadnoughts like Kaiser Karl der Grosse obsolete, began to enter service. In June and July 1911, the ship underwent a major overhaul. By 1914, the ship had been assigned to V Squadron of the Reserve Fleet, alongside her four sister ships and the battleship Wettin.

=== World War I ===
Kaiser Karl der Grosse in a floating dry dock

As a result of the outbreak of World War I, Kaiser Karl der Grosse and her sisters were brought out of reserve and mobilized as V Battle Squadron on 5 August 1914. The ships were prepared for war very slowly, and they were not ready for service in the North Sea until the end of August. They were initially tasked with coastal defense, though they served in this capacity for a short time. In mid-September, V Squadron was transferred to the Baltic, under the command of Prince Heinrich. He initially planned to launch a major amphibious assault on Windau, but a shortage of transports forced a revision of the plan. Instead, V Squadron was to carry the landing force, but this too was cancelled after Heinrich received false reports of British warships having entered the Baltic on 25 September. Kaiser Karl der Grosse and her sisters returned to Kiel the following day, disembarked the landing force, and proceeded to the North Sea, where they resumed guard ship duties. Before the end of the year, V Squadron was once again transferred to the Baltic.

Prince Heinrich ordered a foray toward Gotland. On 26 December 1914, the battleships rendezvoused with the Baltic cruiser division in the Bay of Pomerania and then departed on the sortie. Two days later, the fleet arrived off Gotland to show the German flag and was back in Kiel by 30 December. Kaiser Karl der Grosse briefly replaced her sister Kaiser Wilhelm II as the squadron flagship, from 23 January 1915 to 23 February. The squadron returned to the North Sea for guard duties, but was withdrawn from front-line service by February. Shortages of trained crews in the High Seas Fleet, coupled with the risk of operating older ships in wartime, necessitated the deactivation of Kaiser der Grosse and her sisters. Starting in October, she served briefly as a training ship for engine room personnel, though on 19 November she was decommissioned in Kiel and disarmed. She was thereafter employed as a prison ship for prisoners of war in Wilhelmshaven. In November 1918, Germany capitulated and signed the First Armistice at Compiègne, which ended hostilities so a peace treaty could be negotiated. According to Article 181 of the Treaty of Versailles, signed on 28 June 1919, Germany was permitted to retain only six battleships of the "Deutschland or Lothringen types". (Note: Treaty of Versailles Section II, Article 181.) On 6 December 1919, the ship was struck from the naval list and sold to ship-breakers. The following year, Kaiser Karl der Grosse was broken up for scrap metal in Rönnebeck.
