= SMS Kaiser Barbarossa =

Battleship of the German Imperial Navy

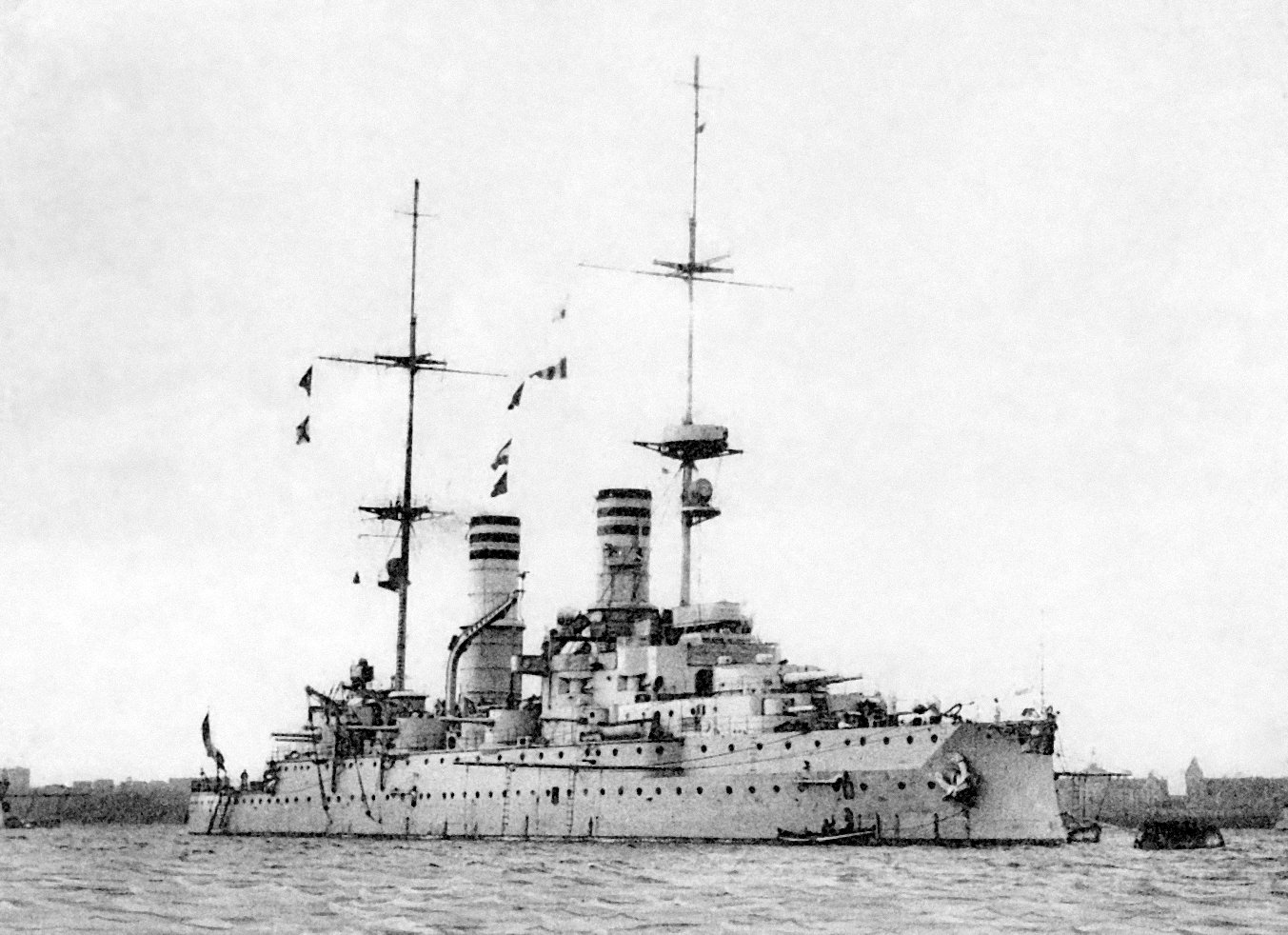
- Kaiser Barbarossa

History

Germany
- Name: Kaiser Barbarossa
- Namesake: Frederick I Barbarossa
- Builder: Schichau, Danzig
- Laid down: 3 August 1898
- Launched: 21 April 1900
- Commissioned: 10 June 1901
- Stricken: 6 December 1919
- Fate: Scrapped in 1920

General characteristics
- Class & type: Kaiser Friedrich III-class battleship
- Displacement: Normal: 11,097 t (10,922 long tons); Full load: 11,785 t (11,599 long tons)
- Length: 125.3 m (411 ft 1 in)
- Beam: 20.4 m (66 ft 11 in)
- Draft: 7.89 m (25 ft 11 in)
- Installed power: 12 × water-tube boilers; 13,000 PS (12,820 ihp; 9,560 kW)
- Propulsion: 3 × triple-expansion steam engines; 3 × screw propellers
- Speed: 17.5 knots (32.4 km/h; 20.1 mph)
- Range: 3,420 nmi (6,330 km; 3,940 mi) at 10 knots (19 km/h; 12 mph)
- Complement: 39 officers; 612 enlisted
- Armament: 4 × 24 cm (9.4 in) 40 cal guns; 18 × 15 cm (5.9 in) SK L/40 guns; 12 × 8.8 cm (3.5 in) SK L/30 guns; 12 × 3.7 cm (1.5 in) machine cannon; 6 × 45 cm (17.7 in) torpedo tubes
- Armor: Belt: 300 mm (11.8 in); Deck: 65 mm (2.6 in); Conning tower: 250 mm (9.8 in); Turrets: 250 mm; Casemates: 150 mm

SMS Kaiser Barbarossa (Note: "SMS" stands for "Seiner Majestät Schiff" (German: His Majesty's Ship).) was a German pre-dreadnought battleship of the Kaiser Friedrich III class. The ship was built for the Imperial Navy, which had begun a program of expansion at the direction of Kaiser Wilhelm II. Construction took place at Schichau, in Danzig. Kaiser Barbarossa was laid down in August 1898, launched on 21 April 1900, and commissioned in June 1901. The ship was armed with a main battery of four 24-centimeter (9.4 in) guns in two twin-gun turrets.

Kaiser Barbarossa served with the German navy from her commissioning in 1901, though her active career was limited by two lengthy stays in dry dock. The first was for repairs following damage to her rudder in 1903, which lasted until early 1905, and the second for a major modernization, which began immediately after the conclusion of repair work in 1905 and lasted until late 1907. She returned to service for another two years, before being decommissioned in 1909 and placed in the Reserve Division. She continued to participate in fleet training exercises for the next three years.

Following the outbreak of World War I in August 1914, Kaiser Barbarossa and her sisters were mobilized as coastal defense ships in V Battle Squadron and assigned to the North and Baltic Seas. She saw no combat during the war and, due to a shortage of crews, the ships were withdrawn from active duty in February 1915 and relegated to secondary duties. Kaiser Barbarossa was briefly used as a torpedo target ship for most of 1915 and thereafter spent the remainder of the war as a prison ship in Wilhelmshaven. Following the end of the war in 1918, Kaiser Barbarossa was decommissioned and sold for scrap metal. The ship was broken up in 1919–20.

== Design ==
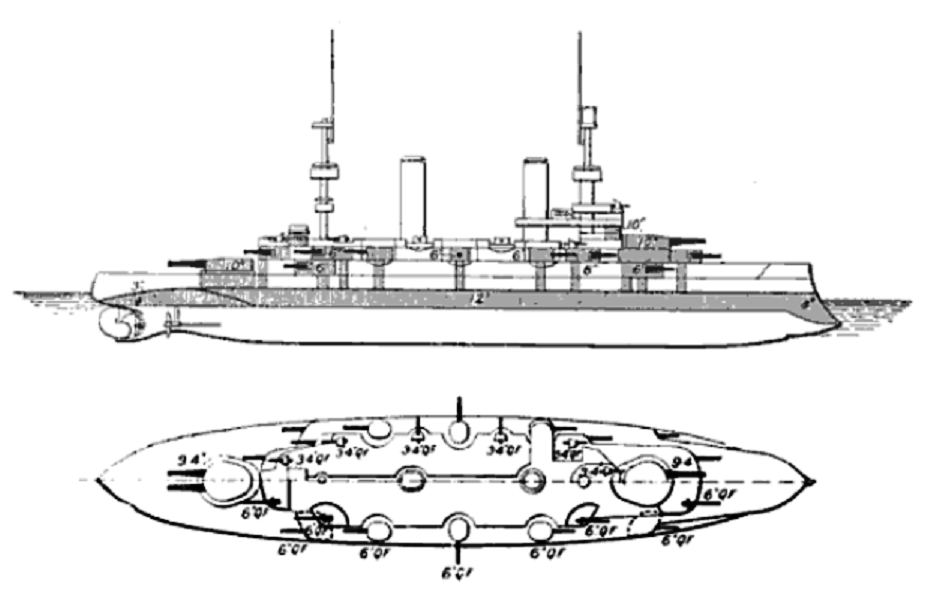
Plan and profile drawing of the Kaiser Friedrich III class

After the German Kaiserliche Marine (Imperial Navy) ordered the four Brandenburg-class battleships in 1889, a combination of budgetary constraints, opposition in the Reichstag (Imperial Diet), and a lack of a coherent fleet plan delayed the acquisition of further battleships. The former Secretary of the Reichsmarineamt (Imperial Navy Office), Leo von Caprivi became the Chancellor of Germany in 1890, and Vizeadmiral (Vice Admiral) Friedrich von Hollmann became the new Secretary of the Reichsmarineamt. Hollmann requested the first Kaiser Friedrich III-class pre-dreadnought battleship in 1892, but the Franco-Russian Alliance, signed the year before, put the government's attention on expanding the Army's budget. Parliamentary opposition forced Hollmann to delay until the following year, when Caprivi spoke in favor of the project, noting that Russia's recent naval expansion threatened Germany's Baltic Sea coastline. In late 1893, Hollmann presented the Navy's estimates for the 1894–1895 budget year, and now the Reichstag approved the new ship, and over the following three years, he secured approval for two further ships. In June 1897, Hollmann was replaced by Konteradmiral (Rear Admiral) Alfred von Tirpitz, who quickly proposed and secured approval for the first Naval Law in early 1898. The law authorized the last two ships of the class, Kaiser Barbarossa and Kaiser Karl der Grosse.

Kaiser Barbarossa was 125.3 m (411 ft 1 in) long overall and had a beam of 20.4 m (66 ft 11 in) and a draft of 7.89 m (25 ft 11 in) forward and 8.25 m (27 ft 1 in) aft. She displaced 11,097 t (10,922 long tons) as designed and up to 11,785 t (11,599 long tons) at full load. The ship was powered by three 3-cylinder vertical triple-expansion steam engines, each driving one screw propeller. Steam was provided by four Thornycroft boilers and eight cylindrical boilers, all of which burned coal and were vented through a pair of tall funnels. Kaiser Barbarossa's powerplant was rated at 13,000 metric horsepower (12,820 ihp; 9,560 kW), which generated a top speed of 17.5 knots (32.4 km/h; 20.1 mph). The ship had a cruising radius of 3,420 nautical miles (6,330 km; 3,940 mi) at a speed of 10 knots (19 km/h; 12 mph). She had a normal crew of 39 officers and 612 enlisted men.

The ship's armament consisted of a main battery of four 24 cm (9.4 in) SK L/40 guns (Note: In Imperial German Navy gun nomenclature, "SK" (Schnelladekanone) denotes that the gun is quick firing, while the L/40 denotes the length of the gun. In this case, the L/40 gun is 40 caliber, meaning that the gun is 40 times as long as it is in diameter.) in twin gun turrets, one fore and one aft of the central superstructure. Her secondary armament consisted of eighteen 15 cm (5.9 inch) SK L/40 guns carried in a mix of turrets and casemates. Close-range defense against torpedo boats was provided by a battery of twelve 8.8 cm (3.5 in) SK L/30 quick-firing guns all mounted in casemates, and twelve 3.7 cm (1.5 in) machine cannon in single mounts. The armament suite was rounded out with six 45 cm (17.7 in) torpedo tubes, all in above-water swivel mounts. The ship's belt armor was 300 mm (11.8 in) thick, and the main armor deck was 65 mm (2.6 in) thick. The conning tower and main battery turrets were protected with 250 mm (9.8 in) of armor plating, and the secondary casemates received 150 mm (5.9 in) of armor protection.

== Service history ==
Kaiser Barbarossa, as built, steaming at full speed

=== Peacetime career ===
Kaiser Wilhelm II, the Emperor of Germany, believed that a strong navy was necessary for the country to expand its influence outside continental Europe. As a result, he initiated a program of naval expansion in the late 1880s; the first battleships built under this program were the four Brandenburg-class ships. These were immediately followed by the five Kaiser Friedrich III-class battleships, of which Kaiser Barbarossa was a member. Kaiser Barbarossa's keel was laid down on 3 August 1898, at the Schichau-Werke in Danzig, under construction number 640. She was ordered under the contract name "A" as an addition to the fleet. (Note: German warships were ordered under provisional names. Additions to the fleet were given a single letter; ships intended to replace older or lost vessels were ordered as "Ersatz (name of the ship to be replaced)".) Kaiser Barbarossa was launched on 21 April 1900. The then-Vizeadmiral Alfred von Tirpitz, the State Secretary of the Reichsmarineamt, gave the launching speech, and the new battleship was christened by Princess Luise Sofie of Prussia, Wilhelm II's sister-in-law. Sea trials began on 4 May 1901, during which two tests were recorded: a 50-hour endurance test and a 6-hour speed test. The former produced a sustained speed of 15.5 knots (28.7 km/h; 17.8 mph), while the latter saw a maximum speed of 18 knots (33 km/h; 21 mph), and on 10 June she was commissioned into the fleet in Kiel.

Following her commissioning, Kaiser Barbarossa was assigned to I Squadron of the Heimatflotte (Home Fleet), which shortly thereafter went on a cruise to Spain. While moored in Cádiz, the ships met the four Brandenburg-class ships, which were returning from their expedition to suppress the Boxer Uprising in China. From 22 August to 21 September, Kaiser Barbarossa participated in the annual autumn maneuvers of the entire fleet. While in the Danzig Bay, the fleet conducted a naval review for the visiting Tsar Nicholas II of Russia, whose wife Alexandra was Wilhelm's cousin. The winter cruise in December went to southern Norway. In April and May 1902, the squadron went on a training cruise to Britain, followed by a tour of the Kiel Week sailing regatta in late June. The ships then took part in another training cruise to Norway in July and then the autumn maneuvers, which began in the Baltic and concluded in the North Sea with a fleet review in the Jade. During the exercise, which lasted from 17 August to 18 September, Kaiser Barbarossa and the rest of I Squadron were assigned to play the roles of both the German fleet and hostile forces. The usual winter cruise went to Bergen, Norway, that year.

In 1903 the fleet, which was composed of only one squadron of modern battleships, was reorganized as the "Active Battle Fleet". Kaiser Barbarossa remained in I Squadron along with her sister ships and the newest Wittelsbach-class battleships, while the older Brandenburg-class ships were placed in reserve in order to be rebuilt. The first quarter of 1903 followed the usual pattern of training exercises. The squadron went on a training cruise in the Baltic, followed by a voyage to Spain that lasted from 7 May to 10 June. The ship suffered some damage to her rudder, which necessitated temporary repairs at the Kaiserliche Werft (Imperial Shipyard) in Kiel from the end of July to 21 August. She thereafter took part in the autumn maneuvers and the winter cruise in the eastern Baltic and the Skagerrak. The autumn maneuvers consisted of a blockade exercise in the North Sea, a cruise of the entire fleet first to Norwegian waters and then to Kiel in early September, and finally a mock attack on Kiel. The exercises concluded on 12 September. The winter training cruise began on 23 November in the eastern Baltic and continued into the Skagerrak in early December. On 15 December, Kaiser Barbarossa was decommissioned for permanent repairs to her rudder, which lasted until January 1905. When the repairs were finished, she did not return to service, however, and instead began a major reconstruction.

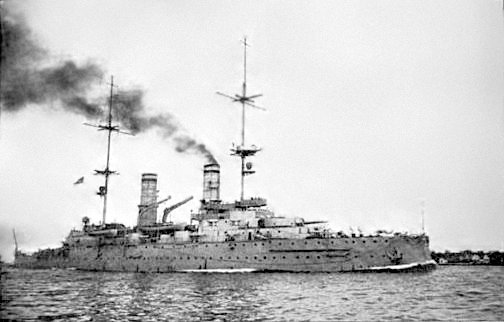
Kaiser Barbarossa after her modernization

During the modernization, four of her 15 cm guns were removed and two 8.8 cm guns were added. All twelve 1-pounder guns were removed, as was the ship's stern-mounted torpedo tube. Kaiser Barbarossa's superstructure was also cut down to reduce the ship's tendency to roll excessively and her military masts were replaced with lighter pole masts. The ship's funnels were also lengthened. Kaiser Barbarossa's modernization was completed by 1 October 1907, when she was recommissioned for service. By that time, the newest Deutschland-class battleships were coming into service; along with the Braunschweig-class battleships, these provided enough modern battleships to create two full battle squadrons. Consequently, the Heimatflotte was renamed the Hochseeflotte (High Seas Fleet). Kaiser Barbarossa returned to her place in I Squadron and she participated in the normal routine of divisional, squadron, and fleet maneuvers and cruises without incident over the next year. The summer fleet cruise in May that year went to the Azores and returned to Kiel on 13 August. The autumn maneuvers lasted from 27 August to 7 September. Divisional exercises in the Baltic immediately followed from 7 to 13 September.

On 17 September 1909, Kaiser Barbarossa was decommissioned and assigned to the Reserve Division in the Baltic Sea. By that time, the new dreadnought battleships, which rendered Kaiser Barbarossa and her sister ships thoroughly obsolete, were beginning to come into service with the fleet. In early 1910, Kaiser Barbarossa was assigned to the Training Squadron, which operated in the Baltic in April. She was reactivated to participate in the autumn maneuvers that year in the provisional III Squadron; after the conclusion of the exercises on 10 September, she was placed back in reserve. More modernization work was done at the Kaiserliche Werft in Kiel. From 31 July to 15 September, she was reactivated again to take part in the autumn maneuvers in III Squadron. She thereafter returned to the Reserve Division in early 1912.

=== World War I ===
Illustration of Kaiser Barbarossa underway, by Oscar Parkes

As a result of the outbreak of World War I, Kaiser Barbarossa and her sisters were brought out of reserve and mobilized as V Battle Squadron on 5 August 1914. The ships were prepared for war very slowly, and they were not ready for service in the North Sea until the end of August. They were initially tasked with coastal defense, though they served in this capacity for a very short time. In mid-September, V Squadron was transferred to the Baltic, under the command of Prince Heinrich. He initially planned to launch a major amphibious assault on Windau, but a shortage of transports forced a revision of the plan. Instead, V Squadron was to carry the landing force, but this too was cancelled after Heinrich received false reports of British warships having entered the Baltic on 25 September. Kaiser Barbarossa and her sisters returned to Kiel the following day, disembarked the landing force, and then proceeded to the North Sea, where they resumed guard ship duties. Before the end of the year, V Squadron was once again transferred to the Baltic.

After returning to the Baltic, Prince Heinrich ordered a foray toward Gotland. On 26 December 1914, the battleships rendezvoused with the Baltic cruiser division in the Bay of Pomerania and then departed on the sortie. Two days later, the fleet arrived off Gotland to show the German flag, and was back in Kiel by 30 December. The squadron returned to the North Sea for guard duties, but was withdrawn from frontline service in February 1915. Shortages of trained crews in the High Seas Fleet, coupled with the risk of operating older ships in wartime, necessitated the deactivation of Kaiser Barbarossa and her sisters. Her crew was reduced on 5 March, only to be replaced on 11 April so the ship could be used as a torpedo target ship; this service lasted until 9 November. Ten days later, she was decommissioned for the last time, and in 1916 she was disarmed. Kaiser Barbarossa was thereafter employed as a floating prison for prisoners of war in Wilhelmshaven. In November 1918, Germany sought an end to the war and signed the First Armistice at Compiègne, which temporarily ended hostilities so a peace treaty could be negotiated. Under the terms of the Treaty of Versailles, which formally ended the war and was signed on 28 June 1919, Germany was permitted to retain only six battleships of the "Deutschland or Lothringen types". (Note: Treaty of Versailles Section II, Article 181.) Accordingly, the ship was struck from the naval list on 6 December 1919 and sold to ship breakers. Kaiser Barbarossa was broken up for scrap metal in Rüstringen in 1919 and 1920.
