= SMS Kaiser Wilhelm der Grosse =

Battleship of the German Imperial Navy

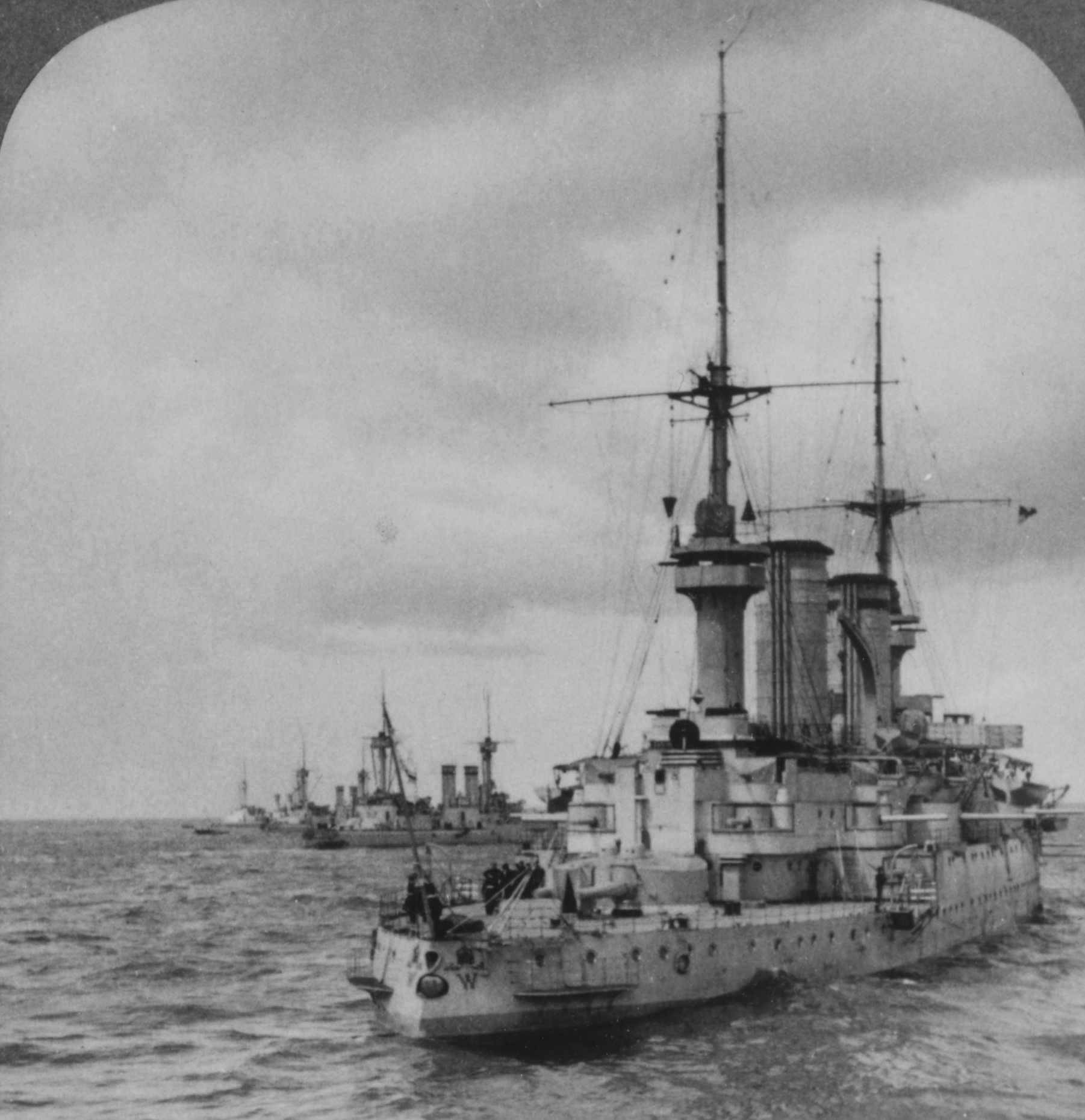
- SMS Kaiser Wilhelm der Grosse, c. 1903

History

German Empire
- Name: Kaiser Wilhelm der Grosse
- Namesake: Wilhelm I
- Builder: Germaniawerft, Kiel
- Laid down: 22 January 1898
- Launched: 1 June 1899
- Commissioned: 5 May 1901
- Stricken: 6 December 1919
- Fate: Scrapped in 1920

General characteristics
- Class & type: Kaiser Friedrich III-class battleship
- Displacement: Normal: 11,097 t (10,922 long tons); Full load: 11,785 t (11,599 long tons)
- Length: 125.3 m (411 ft 1 in) (oa)
- Beam: 20.4 m (66 ft 11 in)
- Draft: 7.89 m (25 ft 11 in)
- Installed power: 12 × fire-tube boilers; 13,000 PS (12,820 ihp; 9,560 kW)
- Propulsion: 3 × triple-expansion steam engines; 3 × screw propellers
- Speed: 17.5 knots (32.4 km/h; 20.1 mph)
- Range: 3,420 nmi (6,330 km; 3,940 mi) at 10 knots (19 km/h; 12 mph)
- Complement: 651
- Armament: 4 × 24 cm (9.4 in) SK L/40 guns; 18 × 15 cm (5.9 in) SK L/40 guns; 12 × 8.8 cm (3.5 in) SK L/30 guns; 12 × 3.7 cm (1.5 in) machine cannon; 6 × 45 cm (17.7 in) torpedo tubes
- Armor: Belt: 300 mm (12 in); Deck: 65 mm (2.6 in); Conning Tower: 250 mm (9.8 in); Turrets: 250 mm; Casemates: 150 mm

SMS Kaiser Wilhelm der Grosse ("HMS Emperor William the Great") (Note: "SMS" stands for "Seiner Majestät Schiff" (German: His Majesty's Ship).) was a German pre-dreadnought battleship of the Kaiser Friedrich III class, built around the turn of the 20th century. The ship was one of the first battleships built by the German Imperial Navy (Kaiserliche Marine) as part of a program of naval expansion under Kaiser Wilhelm II. Kaiser Wilhelm der Grosse (Note: In German, the ship's name was rendered with an eszett, as Kaiser Wilhelm der Große. Most English-language sources replace the eszett.) was built in Kiel at the Germaniawerft shipyard. She was laid down in January 1898, launched in June 1899, and completed in May 1901. The ship was armed with a main battery of four 24-centimeter (9.4 in) guns in two twin turrets.

Kaiser Wilhelm der Grosse served in the main fleet—the Heimatflotte (Home Fleet) and later the Hochseeflotte (High Seas Fleet)—for the first seven years of her career. She participated in several of the fleet's training cruises and maneuvers, primarily in the North and Baltic Seas. Her peacetime career was relatively uneventful and she suffered no accidents. She was decommissioned for a major reconstruction in 1908–10, after which she was assigned to the Reserve Division with her four sister ships, all of which were essentially obsolete by that time.

At the outbreak of World War I in 1914, the battleship and her sisters were placed back in active service as V Battle Squadron of the High Seas Fleet and deployed to coastal defense in the North Sea. They were also deployed briefly to the Baltic but saw no action. In 1915, the ships were again withdrawn from service and relegated to secondary duties. Kaiser Wilhelm der Grosse was used as a depot ship in Kiel and eventually a torpedo target ship. After the war, the Treaty of Versailles greatly reduced the size of the German Navy. The vessel was sold for scrap to a German company and broken up in 1920.

== Design ==
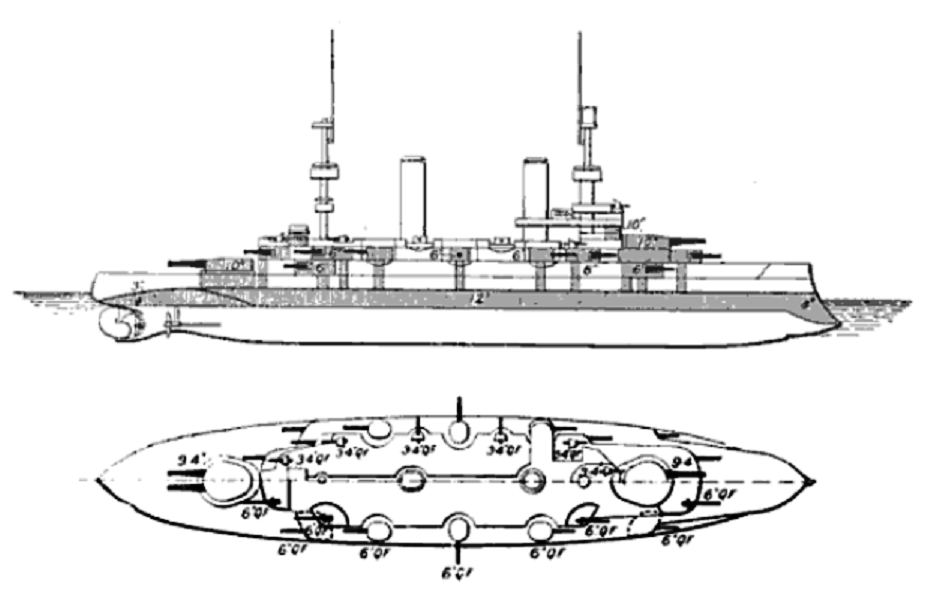
Plan and profile drawing of the Kaiser Friedrich III class

After the German Kaiserliche Marine (Imperial Navy) ordered the four Brandenburg-class battleships in 1889, a combination of budgetary constraints, opposition in the Reichstag (Imperial Diet), and a lack of a coherent fleet plan delayed the acquisition of further battleships. The former Secretary of the Reichsmarineamt (Imperial Navy Office), Leo von Caprivi became the Chancellor of Germany in 1890, and Vizeadmiral (Vice Admiral) Friedrich von Hollmann became the new Secretary of the Reichsmarineamt. Hollmann requested the first Kaiser Friedrich III-class pre-dreadnought battleship in 1892, but the Franco-Russian Alliance, signed the year before, put the government's attention on expanding the Army's budget. Parliamentary opposition forced Hollmann to delay until the following year, when Caprivi spoke in favor of the project, noting that Russia's recent naval expansion threatened Germany's Baltic Sea coastline. In late 1893, Hollmann presented the Navy's estimates for the 1894–1895 budget year, and now the Reichstag approved the new ship; a second member of the class followed in early 1896, and the third ship, Kaiser Wilhelm der Grosse, was authorized for the following year's budget.

Kaiser Wilhelm der Grosse was 125.3 m (411 ft 1 in) long overall and had a beam of 20.4 m (66 ft 11 in) and a draft of 7.89 m (25 ft 11 in) forward and 8.25 m (27 ft 1 in) aft. She displaced 11,097 t (10,922 long tons) as designed and up to 11,785 t (11,599 long tons) at full load. The ship was powered by three 3-cylinder vertical triple-expansion steam engines that drove three screw propellers. Steam was provided by four Marine-type and eight cylindrical boilers, all of which burned coal and were vented through a pair of tall funnels. Kaiser Wilhelm der Grosse's powerplant was rated at 13,000 metric horsepower (12,820 ihp; 9,560 kW), which generated a top speed of 17.5 knots (32.4 km/h; 20.1 mph). She had a cruising radius of 3,420 nautical miles (6,330 km; 3,940 mi) at a speed of 10 knots (19 km/h; 12 mph). She had a normal crew of 39 officers and 612 enlisted men.

The ship's armament consisted of a main battery of four 24 cm (9.4 in) SK L/40 guns in twin turrets, (Note: In Imperial German Navy gun nomenclature, "SK" (Schnelladekanone) denotes that the gun is quick firing; L/40 denotes caliber.) one fore and one aft of the central superstructure on the centerline. Her secondary armament consisted of eighteen 15 cm (5.9 inch) SK L/40 guns carried in a mix of turrets and casemates. Close-range defense against torpedo boats was provided by a battery of twelve 8.8 cm (3.5 in) SK L/30 quick-firing guns all mounted in casemates. She also carried twelve 3.7 cm (1.5 in) machine cannon. Six 45 cm (17.7 in) torpedo tubes were mounted in above-water swivel mounts. The ship's belt armor was 300 mm (12 in) thick, and the main armor deck was 65 mm (2.6 in) thick. The conning tower and main battery turrets were protected with 250 mm (9.8 in) of armor, and the secondary casemates received 150 mm (5.9 in) of protection.

== Service history ==
=== Construction and early service ===
Kaiser Wilhelm der Grosse at her launching

Kaiser Wilhelm II, the emperor of Germany, believed a strong navy was necessary for the country to expand its influence outside continental Europe. He initiated a program of naval expansion in the late 1880s; the first battleships built under this program were the four Brandenburg-class ships. These were immediately followed by the five Kaiser Friedrich III-class battleships, of which Kaiser Wilhelm der Grosse was the third. Her keel was laid on 22 January 1898 at the Germaniawerft shipyard in Kiel, as construction number 22. She was ordered under the contract name Ersatz König Wilhelm, (Note: German warships were ordered under provisional names. Additions to the fleet were given a single letter; ships intended to replace older or lost vessels were ordered as "Ersatz (name of the ship to be replaced)".) to replace the obsolete armored frigate König Wilhelm. Her scheduled launching on 29 April 1899 was delayed to 1 June after a large fire at the shipyard damaged the slipway. Louise, the Grand Duchess of Baden, christened the ship after her father Wilhelm I of Germany, the ship's namesake. Wilhelm II gave the launching speech for the ship commemorating his grandfather. After completing fitting-out work, dockyard sea trials began on 19 February 1901, followed by acceptance trials beginning 18 March. These were completed by May, and she was formally commissioned on 5 May. That year, Erich Raeder—who went on to command the Kriegsmarine in World War II—was promoted to serve as a watch officer aboard her.

After commissioning in 1901, Kaiser Wilhelm der Grosse joined her sister ships in I Squadron of the Heimatflotte (Home Fleet). After her sister Kaiser Friedrich III ran aground and had to be docked for repairs, Kaiser Wilhelm der Grosse replaced her as the I Squadron flagship, which was commanded by Prince Heinrich, the brother of Wilhelm II. She held this post until 24 October, when Kaiser Friedrich III returned to service. In the meantime, Kaiser Wilhelm der Grosse was present for the Kiel Week sailing regatta in June and the dedication of a monument at the Marineakademie (Naval Academy) in Kiel. At the end of July, she led the squadron on a cruise to Spanish waters, and while docked in Cádiz, they rendezvoused with the Brandenburg-class battleships returning from East Asian waters. I Squadron was back in Kiel by 11 August, though the late arrival of the Brandenburgs delayed the participation of I Squadron in the annual autumn fleet training. The maneuvers began with exercises in the German Bight, followed by a mock attack on the fortifications in the lower Elbe. Gunnery drills took place in Kiel Bay before the fleet steamed to Danzig Bay, where the maneuvers concluded on 15 September. Kaiser Wilhelm der Grosse and the rest of I Squadron went on their normal winter cruise to Norway in December, which included a stop at Oslo from 7 to 12 December.

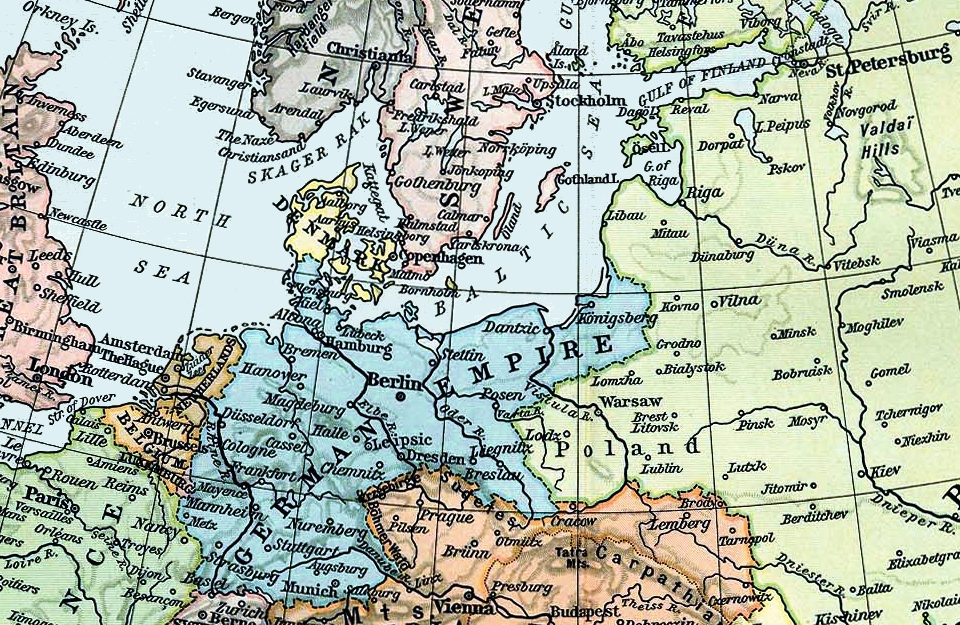
Map of the North and Baltic Seas in 1911

On 13 December, the new pre-dreadnought battleship Wittelsbach ran aground off Korsør; Kaiser Wilhelm der Grosse took her under tow back to port. I Squadron went on a short cruise in the western Baltic Sea, then embarked on a major cruise around the British Isles, which lasted from 25 April to 28 May. Individual and squadron maneuvers took place from June to August, interrupted only by a cruise to Norway in July. The annual fleet maneuvers began in August in the Baltic and concluded in the North Sea with a fleet review in the Jade Bight. During the exercises, Kaiser Wilhelm der Grosse was assigned to the "hostile" force, as were several of her sister ships. The "hostile" force was first tasked with preventing the "German" squadron from passing through the Great Belt into the Baltic. Kaiser Wilhelm der Grosse and several other battleships were then tasked with forcing an entry into the mouth of the Elbe River, where the Kaiser Wilhelm Canal and Hamburg could be seized. The "hostile" flotilla accomplished these tasks within three days. The regular winter cruise followed during 1–12 December.

In 1903, the fleet, which was composed of only one squadron of battleships, was reorganized as the "Active Battle Fleet". Kaiser Wilhelm der Grosse remained in I Squadron along with her sister ships and the newest Wittelsbach-class battleships, while the older Brandenburg-class ships were placed in reserve to be rebuilt. The first quarter of 1903 followed the usual pattern of training exercises. The squadron went on a training cruise in the Baltic, followed by a voyage to Spain from 7 May to 10 June. In July, I Squadron went on its annual cruise to Norway. The autumn maneuvers consisted of a blockade exercise in the North Sea, a cruise of the entire fleet first to Norwegian waters and then to Kiel in early September, and finally a mock attack on Kiel. The exercises concluded on 12 September. The winter cruise began on 23 November in the eastern Baltic and continued into the Skagerrak on 1 December.

=== 1904–1914 ===
I Squadron held its first exercise of 1904 in the Skagerrak from 11 to 21 January. Further squadron exercises followed from 8 to 17 March. A major fleet exercise took place in the North Sea in May, and in July I Squadron and I Scouting Group visited Britain, stopping at Plymouth on 10 July. The German fleet departed on 13 July, bound for the Netherlands; I Squadron anchored in Vlissingen the following day. There, the ships were visited by Queen Wilhelmina. I Squadron remained in Vlissingen until 20 July, when it departed for a cruise in the northern North Sea with the rest of the fleet. The squadron stopped in Molde, Norway, on 29 July, while the other units went to other ports. The fleet reassembled on 6 August and steamed back to Kiel, where it conducted a mock attack on the harbor on 12 August. The fleet then began preparations for the autumn maneuvers, which began on 29 August in the Baltic. The fleet moved to the North Sea on 3 September, where it took part in a major amphibious landing exercise, after which the ships took the ground troops from IX Corps that participated in the exercise to Altona for a parade reviewed by Wilhelm II. The ships then conducted their own parade for the Kaiser off the island of Helgoland on 6 September. Three days later, the fleet returned to the Baltic via the Kaiser Wilhelm Canal, where it participated in further landing exercises with IX Corps and the Guards Corps. On 15 September, the maneuvers came to an end. I Squadron went on its winter training cruise, this time to the eastern Baltic, from 22 November to 2 December.

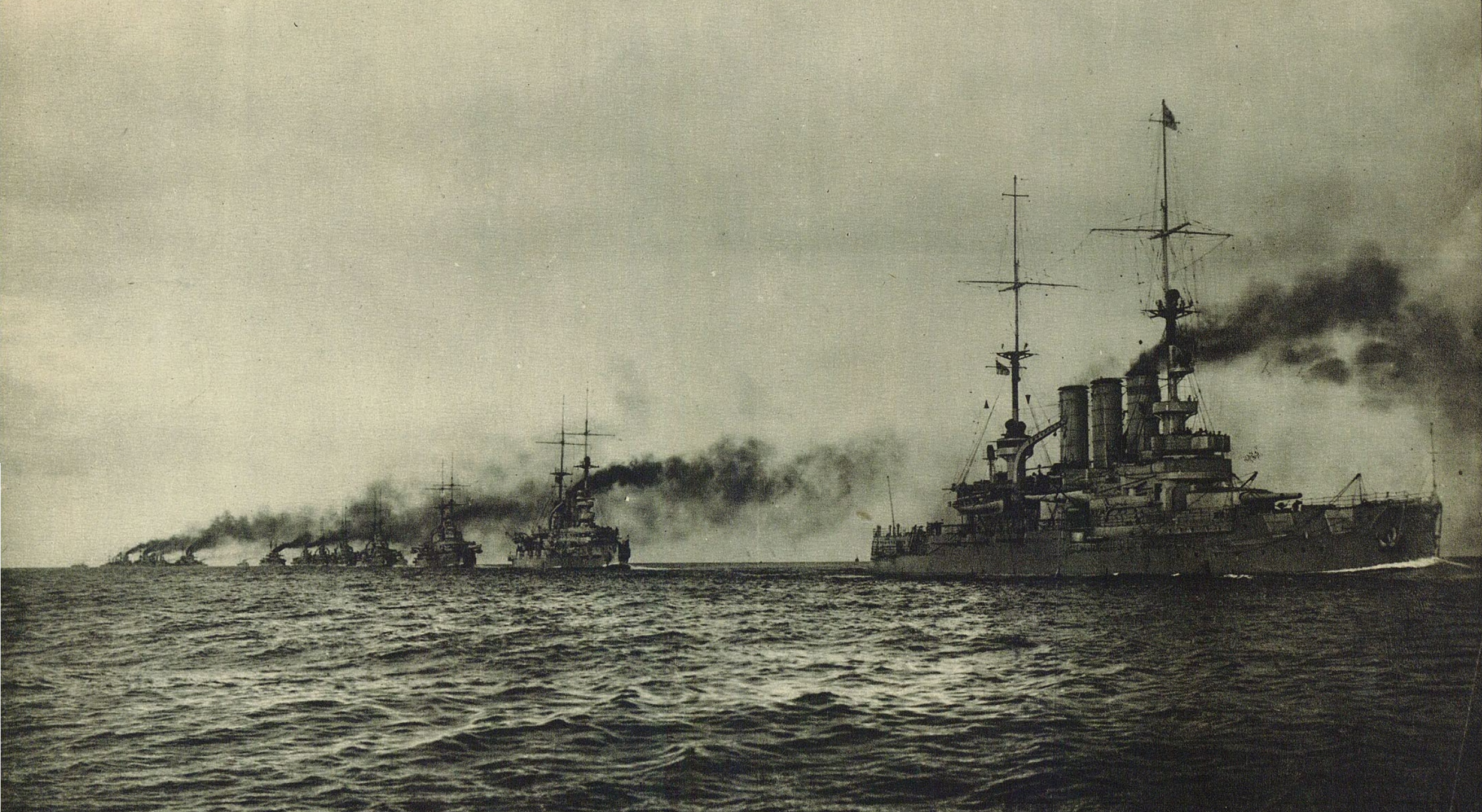
The German battle fleet at sea; a Braunschweig-class battleship leads the line.

The ships of I Squadron went on a pair of training cruises during 9–19 January and 27 February – 16 March 1905. Individual ship and squadron training followed, with an emphasis on gunnery drills. On 12 July, the fleet began a major training exercise in the North Sea. The fleet then cruised through the Kattegat and stopped in Copenhagen and Stockholm. The summer cruise ended on 9 August; the autumn maneuvers that would normally have begun shortly thereafter were delayed by a visit from the British Channel Fleet that month. The British fleet stopped in Danzig, Swinemünde, and Flensburg, where it was greeted by units of the German Navy; Kaiser Wilhelm der Grosse and the main German fleet were anchored at Swinemünde for the occasion. The visit's impact was lessened by the ongoing Anglo-German naval arms race. As a result of the British visit, the 1905 autumn maneuvers were shortened considerably, from 6 to 13 September, and consisted of only exercises in the North Sea. The first exercise presumed a naval blockade in the German Bight, and the second envisioned a hostile fleet attempting to force the defenses of the Elbe. During the exercises, Kaiser Wilhelm der Grosse won the Kaiser's Schiesspreis (Shooting Prize) for excellent gunnery in I Squadron. In October, the ship was reassigned to I Division of II Squadron. In early December, I and II Squadrons went on their regular winter cruise, this time to Danzig, where they arrived on 12 December. On the return trip to Kiel, the fleet conducted tactical exercises.

Over the winter of 1906–1907, Kaiser Wilhelm der Grosse underwent a major overhaul in Kiel, which was completed by the end of April. By this time, the newest Deutschland-class battleships were coming into service; along with the Braunschweig-class battleships, these provided enough modern battleships to create two full battle squadrons. As a result, the Heimatflotte was renamed the Hochseeflotte (High Seas Fleet). Starting on 13 May, major fleet exercises took place in the North Sea and lasted until 8 June with a cruise around the Skagen into the Baltic. The fleet began its usual summer cruise to Norway in mid-July. The fleet was present for the birthday of Norwegian King Haakon VII on 3 August. The German ships departed the following day for Helgoland, to join exercises being conducted there. The fleet was back in Kiel by 15 August, where preparations for the autumn maneuvers began. On 22–24 August, the fleet took part in landing exercises in Eckernförde Bay outside Kiel. The maneuvers were paused from 31 August to 3 September when the fleet hosted vessels from Denmark and Sweden, along with a Russian squadron from 3 to 9 September in Kiel. The maneuvers resumed on 8 September and lasted five more days.

A shorter period of dockyard work took place from 7 December to 27 January 1908. She returned to the fleet for the normal peacetime routine of training exercises, and after the conclusion of the autumn maneuvers, Kaiser Wilhelm der Grosse was decommissioned in Kiel on 21 September. She was taken into the Kaiserliche Werft shipyard in Kiel for an extensive modernization that lasted until 1910. During the refit, four of the ship's 15 cm guns and the stern-mounted torpedo tube were removed. Two 8.8 cm guns were added and the arrangement of the 8.8 cm battery was modified. Her superstructure was also cut down to reduce the ship's tendency to roll excessively, and the ship's funnels were lengthened. After reconstruction, the ship was assigned to the Reserve Division in the Baltic, along with her sister ships. She was reactivated on 31 July 1911 and assigned to III Squadron during the annual fleet exercises, then returned on 15 September to the Reserve Division. She remained there for the rest of her peacetime career.

=== World War I ===
As a result of the outbreak of World War I, Kaiser Wilhelm der Grosse and her sisters were brought out of reserve and mobilized as V Battle Squadron on 5 August 1914. The ships were prepared for war very slowly, and were not ready for service in the North Sea until the end of August. They were initially tasked with coastal defense, but they served in this capacity for only a very short time. In mid-September, V Squadron was transferred to the Baltic, under the command of Prince Heinrich. He initially planned to launch a major amphibious assault against the Russians at Windau, but a shortage of transports forced a revision of the plan. Instead, V Squadron was to carry the landing force, but this too was cancelled after Heinrich received false reports of British warships having entered the Baltic on 25 September. Kaiser Wilhelm der Grosse and her sisters returned to Kiel the following day, disembarked the landing force, and then proceeded to the North Sea, where they resumed guard ship duties. Before the end of the year, V Squadron was once again transferred to the Baltic.

Prince Heinrich ordered a foray toward Gotland. On 26 December 1914, the battleships rendezvoused with the Baltic cruiser division in the Bay of Pomerania and then departed on the sortie. Two days later, the fleet arrived off Gotland to show the German flag, and was back in Kiel by 30 December. The squadron returned to the North Sea for guard duties, but was withdrawn from front-line service in February 1915. Shortages of trained crews in the High Seas Fleet, coupled with the risk of operating older ships in wartime, necessitated the deactivation of Kaiser Wilhelm der Grosse and her sisters. Kaiser Wilhelm der Grosse first went to Hamburg, where her crew was reduced on 5 March. She was moved to Kiel on 30 April, where the rest of her crew were removed. She was disarmed and thereafter used as a depot ship. The following year, the ship was used as a torpedo target ship. The Armistice at Compiègne ended the fighting in November 1918; according to Article 181 of the Treaty of Versailles (which formally ended the war) Germany was permitted to retain only six battleships of the "Deutschland or Lothringen types". (Note: Treaty of Versailles, Section II, Article 181.) On 6 December 1919, the vessel was struck from the naval list and sold to a shipbreaking firm based in Berlin. The following year, Kaiser Wilhelm der Grosse was broken up for scrap metal in Kiel-Nordmole.
