= Geography of Germany =

- Continent: Europe
- Region: Central Europe
- Coordinates: 51.00°N 10.00°E
- Area: Ranked 63rd
  - Total: 357,600 km^{2} (138,100 sq mi)
  - Land: 97.66%
  - Water: 2.34%
- Coastline: 2,389 km (1,484 mi)
- Borders: 3,714 km (2,307 mi) Border lengths included: Czech Republic (817 km) (508 mi); Austria (801 km) (497 mi); Denmark (140 km) (86 mi); Poland (467 km) (290 mi); Switzerland (non-EU) (348 km) (216 mi); Belgium (133 km) (82 mi); France (418 km) (259 mi); Luxembourg (138 km) (85 mi); Netherlands (575 km) (357 mi); Sweden (maritime boundary, Baltic Sea); United Kingdom (maritime boundary, North Sea)
- Highest point: Zugspitze, 2,962.06 m (9,718 ft)
- Lowest point: −3.54 m (−11.61 ft)
- Longest river: Rhine, 1,230 km (764 mi)
- Largest lake: Lake Constance; 536 km^{2} (207 sq mi)
- Climate: temperate
- Terrain: lowlands in north; uplands in center; Alps in south
- Natural resources: coal, lignite, natural gas, iron ore, copper, nickel, uranium, potash, salt, construction materials, timber, arable land
- Natural hazards: flooding and earthquake in Rhineland-Palatinate, North Rhine-Westphalia and Baden-Württemberg. landslide
- Exclusive economic zone: 57,485 km^{2} (22,195 mi^{2})

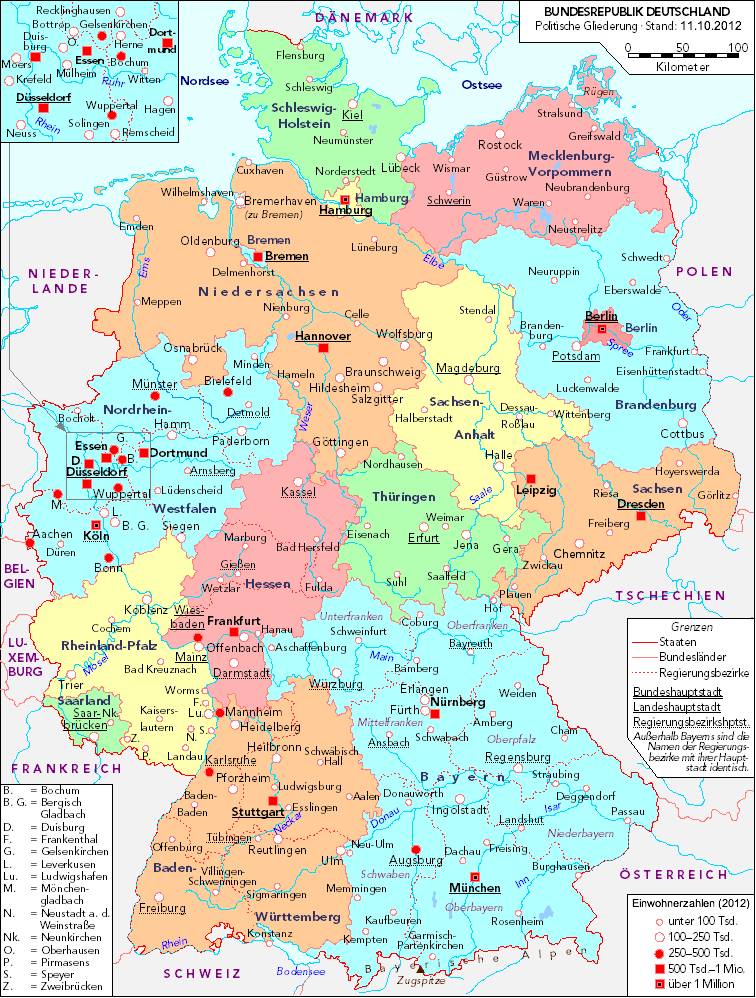
General map of Germany

Germany (German: Deutschland) is a country in Central and Western Europe that stretches from the Alps, across the North European Plain to the North Sea and the Baltic Sea. It is the second-most populous country in Europe after Russia, and is seventh-largest country by area in the continent. The area of Germany ranked 63rd and covers 357,600 km^{2} (138,070 sq mi), consisting of 349,250 km^{2} (134,846 sq mi) of land and 8,350 km^{2} (3,224 sq mi) of waters, smaller than Japan but larger than the Republic of the Congo.

Elevation ranges from the mountains of the Alps (highest point: the Zugspitze at 2,962 metres (9,718 ft)) in the south to the shores of the North Sea (Nordsee) in the northwest and the Baltic Sea (Ostsee) in the northeast. Between lie the forested uplands of central Germany and the low-lying lands of northern Germany (lowest point: Neuendorf-Sachsenbande at 3.54 metres (11.6 ft) below sea level), traversed by some of Europe's major rivers such as the Rhine, Danube and Elbe.

Germany has the second-most borders of any European country, after Russia. It shares borders with nine countries: Denmark in the north, Poland and the Czech Republic in the east, Switzerland (its only non-EU neighbor) and Austria in the south, France in the southwest and Belgium, Luxembourg and the Netherlands in the west. Germany also shares a maritime border with Sweden in the north and the United Kingdom in the northwest.

== Area ==
Germany is in Central Europe, bordering Denmark in the north, Poland and the Czech Republic in the east, Austria and Switzerland in the south, France and Luxembourg in the south-west, and Belgium and the Netherlands in the north-west. It lies mostly between latitudes 47° and 55° N (the tip of Sylt is just north of 55°), and longitudes 5° and 16° E. The territory covers 357,600 km^{2} (138,070 sq mi), consisting of 349,250 km^{2} (134,846 sq mi) of land and 8,350 km^{2} (3,224 sq mi) of water. It is the seventh largest country by area in Europe and the 63rd largest in the world.

=== Extreme points ===
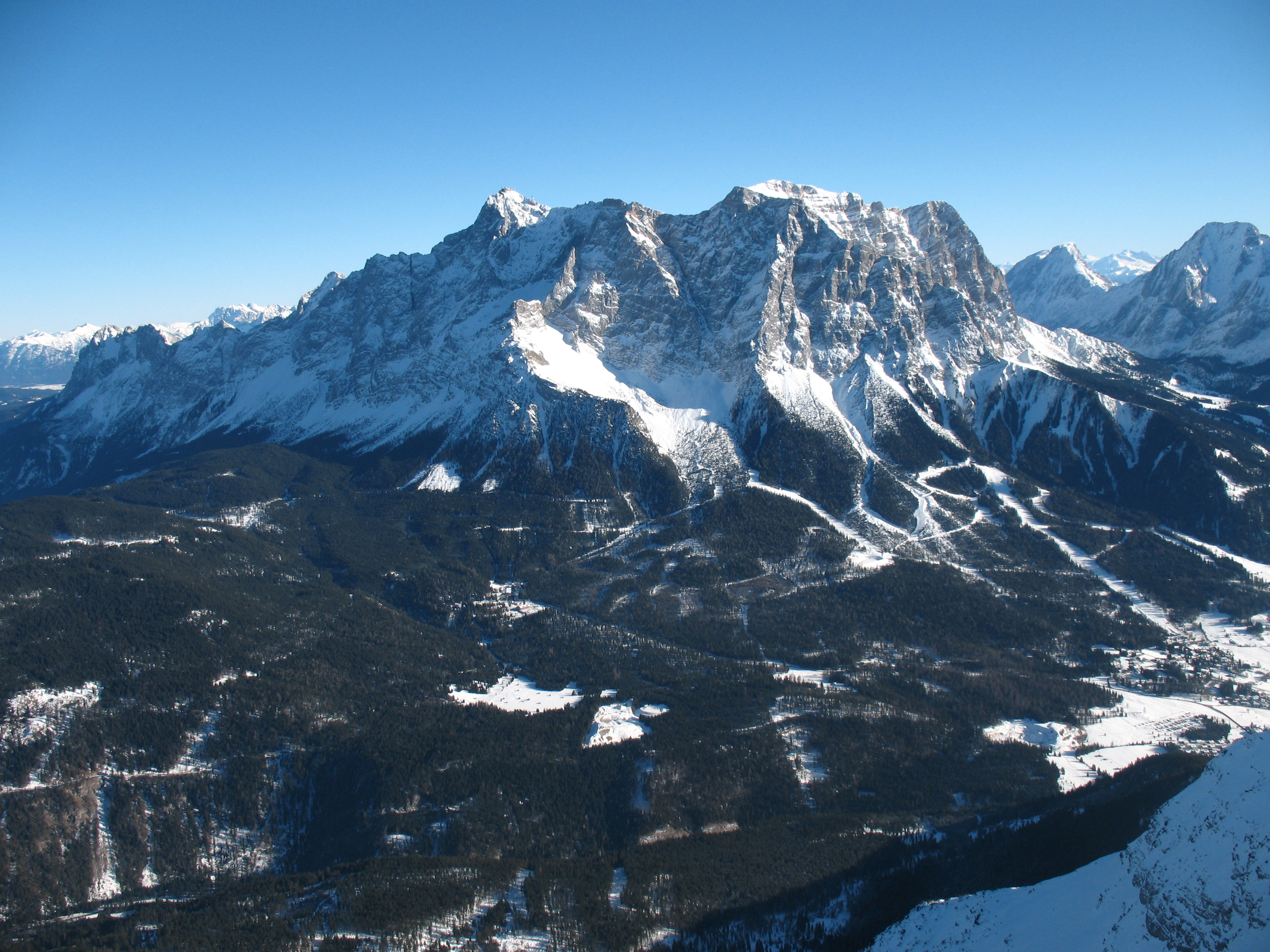
Zugspitze is the highest elevation in Germany.

- Northernmost point: List, Sylt, Schleswig-Holstein 55°03′N 8°24′E
- Northernmost point in mainland Germany: Rodenäs, Schleswig-Holstein 54°54′N 8°49′E
- Southernmost point: Haldenwanger Eck, Oberstdorf, Bavaria 47°16′12.39″N 10°10′41.95″E
- Westernmost point: Isenbruch, Selfkant, North Rhine-Westphalia 51°3′N 5°52′E
- Easternmost point: Deschka, Neißeaue, Saxony 51°16′N 15°2′E
- Lowest point (human-made): Tagebau Hambach 293 m (961 ft) below sea level, Niederzier, North Rhine-Westphalia, 50°54′39″N 6°30′10″E
- Lowest point (natural): Neuendorf-Sachsenbande, Wilstermarsch, Schleswig-Holstein 3.54 m (11.6 ft) below sea level 53°57′48″N 9°19′5″E
- Highest point: Zugspitze, in the Bavarian Alps, 2,962 m (9,718 ft), Garmisch-Partenkirchen / Grainau, Bavaria 47°25′N 10°59′E
- Highest settlement: Feldberg, Baden-Württemberg, in the Black Forest, 1,277 m (4,190 ft)

=== Maritime claims ===
- Continental shelf: 200 m (660 ft) depth or to the depth of exploitation.
- Exclusive economic zone: 57,485 km^{2} (22,195 mi^{2}) with 200 nmi (370.4 km; 230.2 mi). The exact EEZ is due to conventions with neighbouring states.
- Territorial sea: 12 nmi (22.2 km; 13.8 mi)

== Physical geography ==
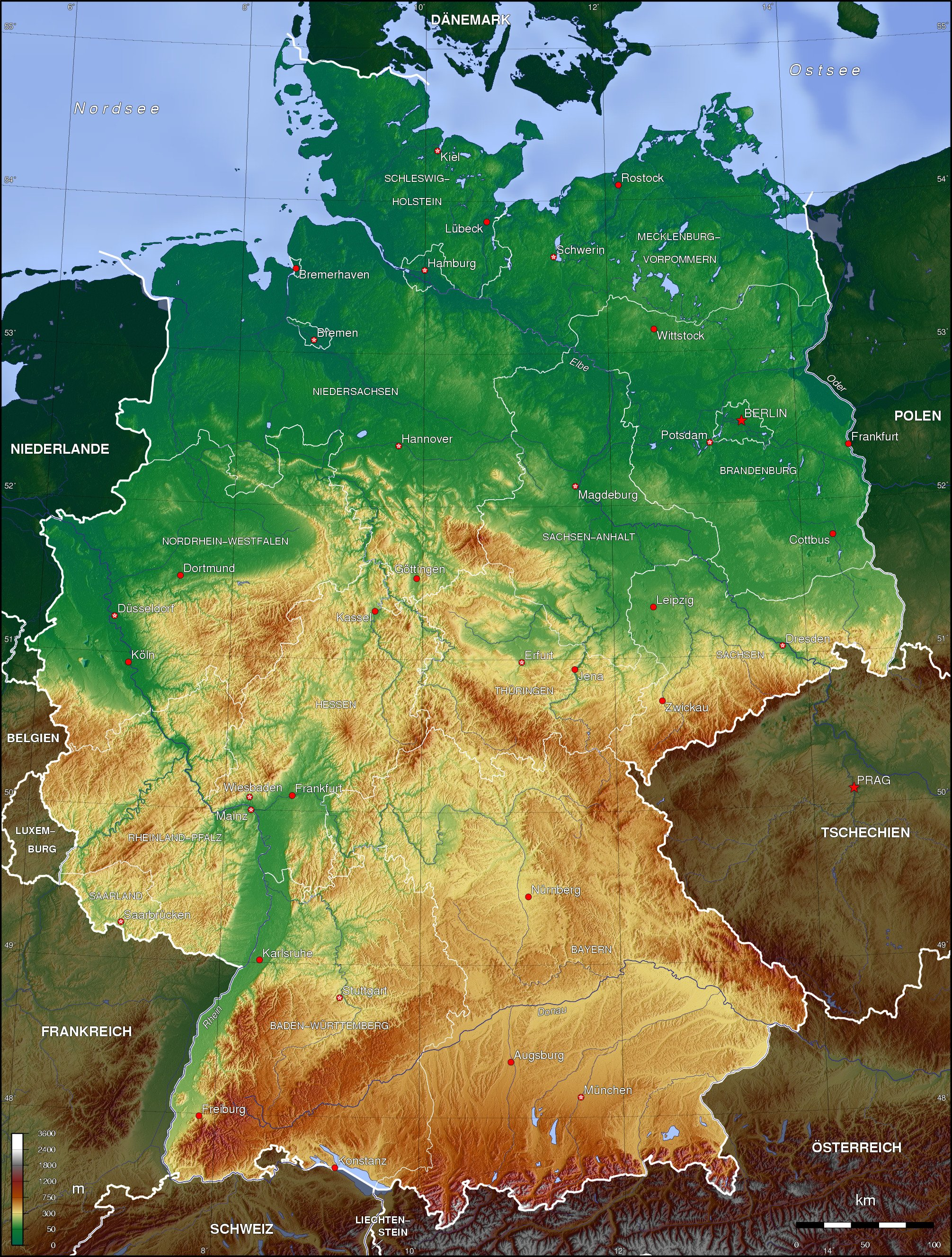
Topographic map of Germany

The northern third of the country lies in the North European Plain, with flat terrain crossed by northward-flowing watercourses (Elbe, Ems, Weser, Oder). Wetlands and marshy conditions are found close to the Dutch border and along the Frisian coast. Sandy Mecklenburg in the northeast has many glacier-formed lakes dating to the last glacial period.

Moving south, central Germany features rough and somewhat patternless hilly and mountainous countryside, some of it formed by ancient volcanic activity. The Rhine valley cuts through the western part of this region. The central uplands continue east and north as far as the Saale and merge with the Ore Mountains on the border with the Czech Republic. Upland regions include the Eifel, Hunsrück and Palatine Forest west of the Rhine, the Taunus hills north of Frankfurt, the Vogelsberg massif, the Rhön, and the Thuringian Forest. South of Berlin, the east-central part of the country is more like the low northern areas, with sandy soil and river wetlands such as the Spreewald region.

Southern Germany's landforms are defined by various linear hill and mountain ranges like the two adjacent ranges of the Swabian and Franconian Alb (reaching approximately from the source of the Danube in the southwest of Baden-Württemberg, south of Stuttgart, across Swabia into Central Franconia and to the valley of the river Main) and the Bavarian Forest along the border between Bavaria and the Czech Republic. The Alps on the southern border are the highest mountains, but relatively little Alpine terrain lies within Germany (in southeastern Swabia and Upper Bavaria) compared to Switzerland and Austria. The Black Forest, on the southwestern border with France, separates the Rhine from the headwaters of the Danube on its eastern slopes.

=== Climate ===
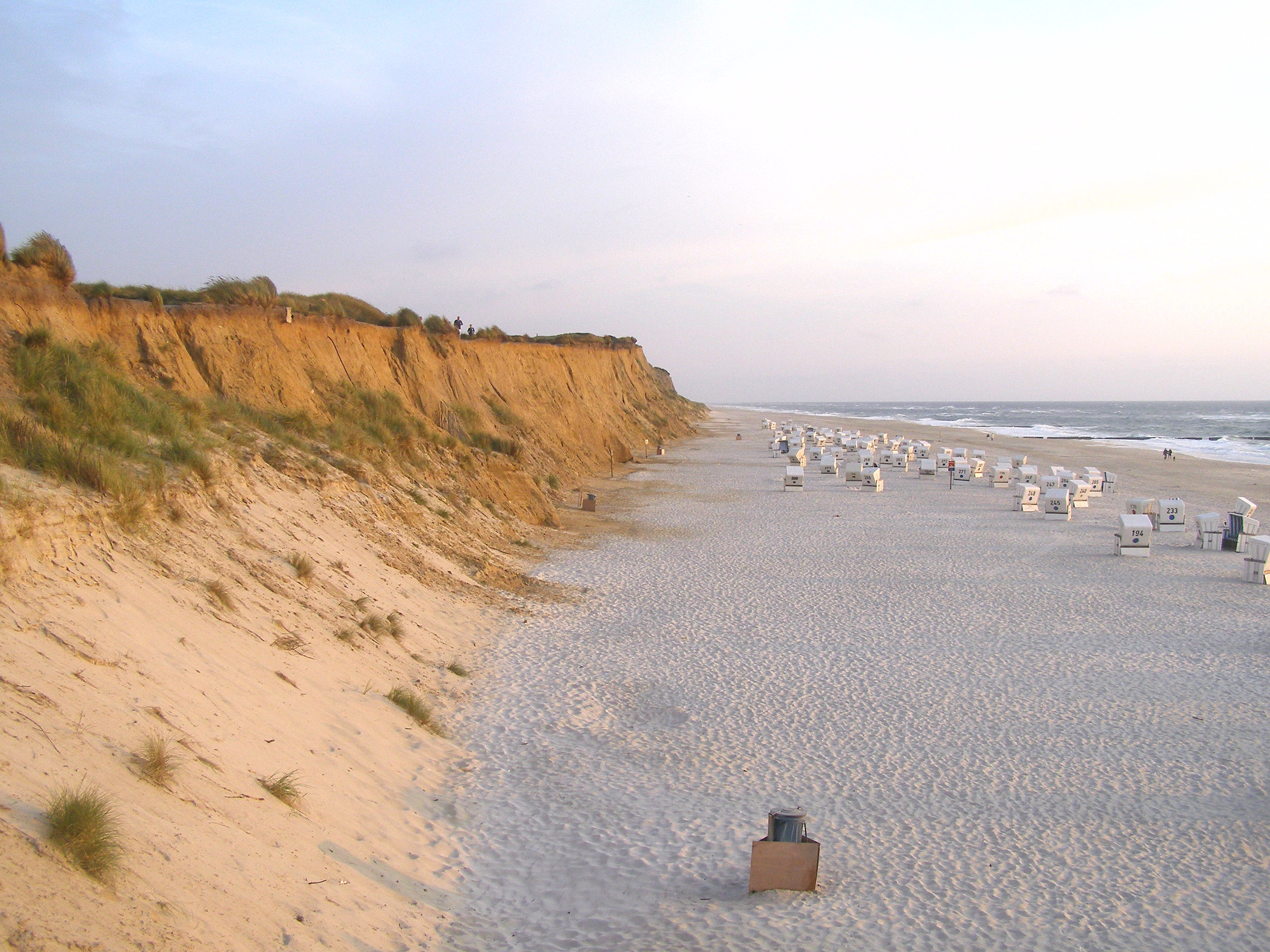
Summer coastal climate on the island of Sylt in Schleswig-Holstein

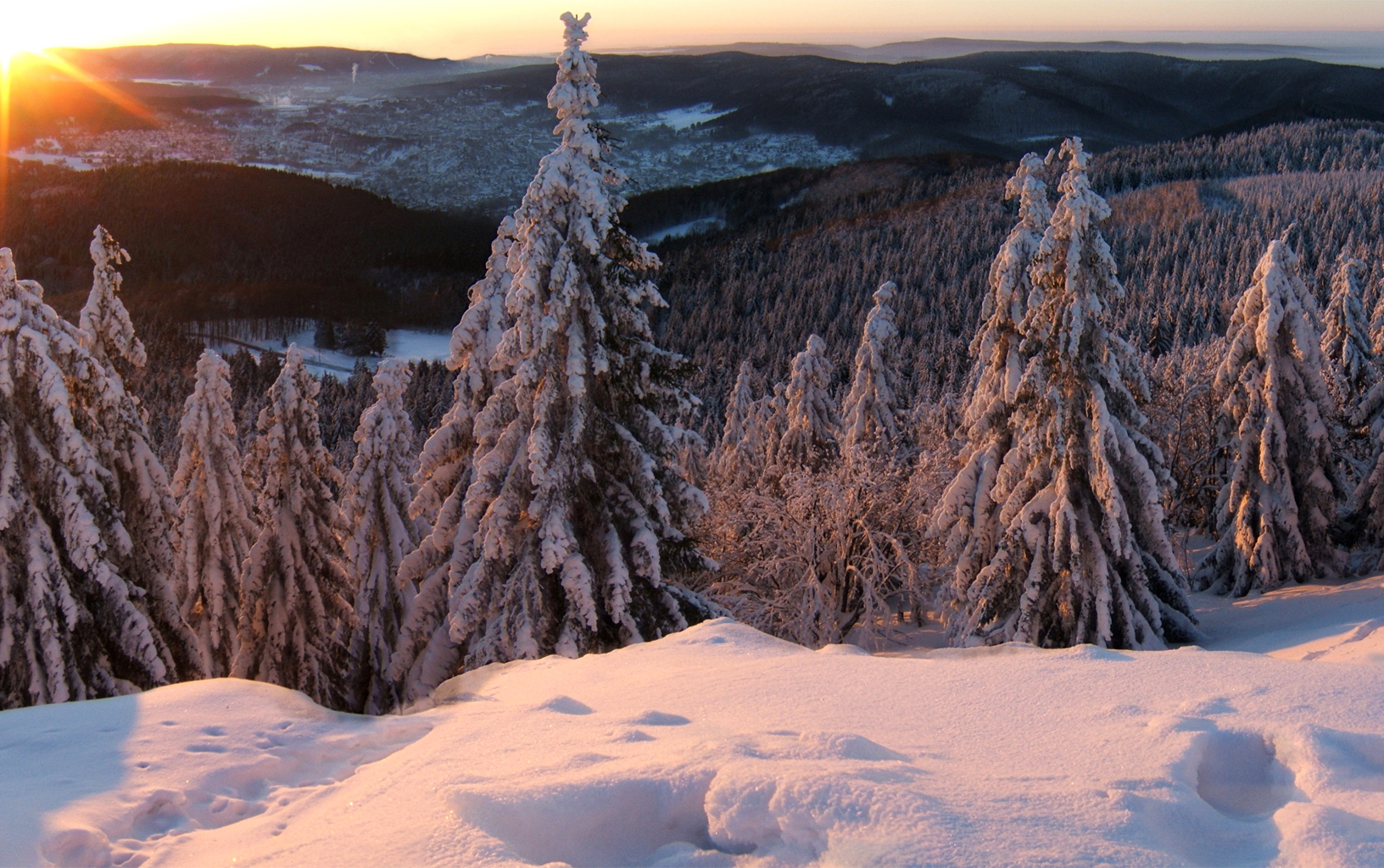
Thuringian Forests in winter

The north–south difference in Germany, between 55°03"N (at List on Sylt) and 47°16"N (around Oberstdorf, Bavaria) equals almost eight degrees of latitude (or 889 km), which can be seen especially during summer in the differences between the average temperatures. Besides that, there is a strong west–east cline in temperature. This is explained by the northwestern Germany's flat and open landscapes and its proximity to the sea, and South's higher terrain, larger distance from the sea, and the Alps. These mountains prevent much of the usually warmer Mediterranean air blowing into southern Germany. To the north of the Alps and the Carpathians, the local climate becomes colder, even at the same latitude and altitude. This is caused by some areas being further away from the Atlantic Ocean's Gulf Stream, known for having a warm current for its latitude, in addition to being closer to Russia's and Siberia's extremely cold winter winds. Even if Siberian winter winds are not dominating, when they do hit Germany, temperatures can in extreme cases fall to -20 C in the mountains and below during the nights, and this has an effect on the average temperatures of November to March. Although rare, when such cold air reaches Germany, the North-Eastern parts become mainly affected, while the Southwest receives few cold days in general. The Gulf Stream results in the coast having the mildest nights in the winter, almost never freezing.

The warmest area in Germany is the area bordering France, west of the Schwarzwald hills, roughly between Mannheim to the north and the Swiss border to the south. The coldest area (except for mountain peaks) is found in the southeastern parts of eastern Germany around Dresden and Görlitz up to Berlin.

Germany's climate is temperate and marine in the west and humid continental in the east. It has cool winters in the west and cold winters in the east. It has moderate rainfall year-round and is mostly overcast from November to February. Summers are warm, more so in the south. The north and centre of Germany lies fully in the temperate climatic zone in which humid westerly winds predominate. In the northwest and the north, the climate is oceanic. Winters there are cool and summers warm. In the east, the climate shows clear continental features; winters are cold and summers warm. Dry periods are often recorded.

In the centre and the south, there is a transitional climate between oceanic or continental. Winters are cool and summers warm, though maximum temperatures can exceed 30 °C (86 °F) for several days in a row during heat waves.

The warmest regions of Germany are in the southwest (see Rhine Rift Valley, German Wine Route and Palatinate). Summers are hot with many days up to 40 °C (104 °F). Sometimes, minimum temperatures do not drop below 20 °C (68 °F), which is relatively rare in other regions, except the North Sea coast and western city climates.

The recorded extremes are a maximum of 41.5 °C (106.7 °F) (June 2026, in Möckern-Drewitz) and a minimum of −37.8 °C (−36.0 °F) (February 1929, in Pfaffenhofen an der Ilm).

==== Examples ====
Climate data for Berlin (Schönefeld), 1981–2010 normals, extremes 1957–present
Month	Jan	Feb	Mar	Apr	May	Jun	Jul	Aug	Sep	Oct	Nov	Dec	Year
Record high °C (°F)	15.1 (59.2)	18.0 (64.4)	25.8 (78.4)	30.8 (87.4)	32.7 (90.9)	35.4 (95.7)	37.3 (99.1)	38.0 (100.4)	32.3 (90.1)	27.7 (81.9)	20.4 (68.7)	15.6 (60.1)	38.0 (100.4)
Mean daily maximum °C (°F)	2.8 (37.0)	4.3 (39.7)	8.7 (47.7)	14.3 (57.7)	19.4 (66.9)	22.0 (71.6)	24.6 (76.3)	24.2 (75.6)	19.3 (66.7)	13.8 (56.8)	7.3 (45.1)	3.3 (37.9)	13.7 (56.7)
Daily mean °C (°F)	0.1 (32.2)	0.9 (33.6)	4.3 (39.7)	9.0 (48.2)	14.0 (57.2)	16.8 (62.2)	19.1 (66.4)	18.5 (65.3)	14.2 (57.6)	9.4 (48.9)	4.4 (39.9)	1.0 (33.8)	9.3 (48.7)
Mean daily minimum °C (°F)	−2.8 (27.0)	−2.4 (27.7)	0.4 (32.7)	3.5 (38.3)	8.2 (46.8)	11.2 (52.2)	13.5 (56.3)	13.0 (55.4)	9.6 (49.3)	5.4 (41.7)	1.4 (34.5)	−1.6 (29.1)	5.0 (41.0)
Record low °C (°F)	−25.3 (−13.5)	−22.0 (−7.6)	−16.0 (3.2)	−7.4 (18.7)	−2.8 (27.0)	1.3 (34.3)	4.9 (40.8)	4.6 (40.3)	−0.9 (30.4)	−7.7 (18.1)	−12.0 (10.4)	−24.0 (−11.2)	−25.3 (−13.5)
Average precipitation mm (inches)	37.2 (1.46)	30.1 (1.19)	39.3 (1.55)	33.7 (1.33)	52.6 (2.07)	60.2 (2.37)	52.5 (2.07)	53.0 (2.09)	39.5 (1.56)	32.2 (1.27)	37.8 (1.49)	46.1 (1.81)	515.2 (20.28)
Mean monthly sunshine hours	57.6	71.5	119.4	191.2	229.6	230.0	232.4	217.3	162.3	114.7	54.9	46.9	1,727.6
Average ultraviolet index	1	1	2	4	5	6	6	5	4	2	1	0	3
Source: DWD and Weather Atlas

Climate data for Hamburg-Fuhlsbuttel (Hamburg Airport), elevation: 15 m, 1981-2010 normals
Month	Jan	Feb	Mar	Apr	May	Jun	Jul	Aug	Sep	Oct	Nov	Dec	Year
Record high °C (°F)	14.4 (57.9)	17.2 (63.0)	23.0 (73.4)	29.7 (85.5)	33.5 (92.3)	34.6 (94.3)	36.9 (98.4)	37.3 (99.1)	32.3 (90.1)	26.1 (79.0)	20.2 (68.4)	15.7 (60.3)	37.3 (99.1)
Mean daily maximum °C (°F)	3.5 (38.3)	4.4 (39.9)	8.0 (46.4)	12.3 (54.1)	17.5 (63.5)	19.9 (67.8)	22.1 (71.8)	22.2 (72.0)	17.9 (64.2)	13.0 (55.4)	7.5 (45.5)	4.6 (40.3)	13.2 (55.8)
Daily mean °C (°F)	1.0 (33.8)	1.6 (34.9)	4.6 (40.3)	7.8 (46.0)	12.5 (54.5)	15.2 (59.4)	17.4 (63.3)	17.4 (63.3)	13.7 (56.7)	9.5 (49.1)	4.9 (40.8)	2.3 (36.1)	9.0 (48.2)
Mean daily minimum °C (°F)	−1.4 (29.5)	−1.2 (29.8)	1.1 (34.0)	3.3 (37.9)	7.4 (45.3)	10.5 (50.9)	12.7 (54.9)	12.5 (54.5)	9.6 (49.3)	6.0 (42.8)	2.4 (36.3)	0.0 (32.0)	6.2 (43.2)
Record low °C (°F)	−22.8 (−9.0)	−29.1 (−20.4)	−15.3 (4.5)	−7.1 (19.2)	−5.0 (23.0)	0.6 (33.1)	3.4 (38.1)	1.8 (35.2)	−1.2 (29.8)	−7.1 (19.2)	−15.4 (4.3)	−18.5 (−1.3)	−29.1 (−20.4)
Average rainfall mm (inches)	67.8 (2.67)	49.9 (1.96)	67.7 (2.67)	43.0 (1.69)	57.4 (2.26)	78.6 (3.09)	76.7 (3.02)	78.9 (3.11)	67.4 (2.65)	67.0 (2.64)	69.2 (2.72)	68.9 (2.71)	792.6 (31.20)
Average rainy days (≥ 1.0 mm)	12.1	9.2	11.3	8.9	9.6	11.3	11.4	10.2	10.8	10.5	11.7	12.4	129.4
Mean monthly sunshine hours	46.9	69.0	108.8	171.6	223.4	198.7	217.5	203.1	144.6	107.9	53.0	37.4	1,581.9
Average ultraviolet index	0	1	2	4	5	6	6	5	4	2	1	0	3
Source: WMO (UN), DWD and Weather Atlas View climate chart 1986-2016 or 1960-1990

Climate data for Freiburg 1991–2020, sunshine 1991-2020, extremes 1949–present
Month	Jan	Feb	Mar	Apr	May	Jun	Jul	Aug	Sep	Oct	Nov	Dec	Year
Record high °C (°F)	20.8 (69.4)	21.9 (71.4)	25.7 (78.3)	30.0 (86.0)	33.7 (92.7)	36.5 (97.7)	38.3 (100.9)	40.2 (104.4)	33.9 (93.0)	30.8 (87.4)	24.2 (75.6)	21.7 (71.1)	40.2 (104.4)
Mean daily maximum °C (°F)	7.5 (45.5)	10.1 (50.2)	13.0 (55.4)	19.2 (66.6)	21.9 (71.4)	25.4 (77.7)	28.5 (83.3)	29.0 (84.2)	23.2 (73.8)	18.0 (64.4)	11.3 (52.3)	9.1 (48.4)	17.5 (63.5)
Daily mean °C (°F)	3.5 (38.3)	5.1 (41.2)	7.2 (45.0)	11.3 (52.3)	15.4 (59.7)	19.0 (66.2)	21.6 (70.9)	21.4 (70.5)	17.2 (63.0)	12.5 (54.5)	7.7 (45.9)	6.8 (44.2)	12.4 (54.3)
Mean daily minimum °C (°F)	1.5 (34.7)	2.0 (35.6)	4.2 (39.6)	7.6 (45.7)	11.2 (52.2)	15.5 (59.9)	17.3 (63.1)	17.8 (64.0)	12.5 (54.5)	10.0 (50.0)	4.7 (40.5)	1.8 (35.2)	7.6 (45.7)
Record low °C (°F)	−16.7 (1.9)	−14 (7)	−5.7 (21.7)	0.1 (32.2)	2.4 (36.3)	6.9 (44.4)	8.8 (47.8)	7.2 (45.0)	4.7 (40.5)	−1.8 (28.8)	−6.1 (21.0)	−15.5 (4.1)	−16.7 (1.9)
Average precipitation mm (inches)	54.5 (2.15)	42.9 (1.69)	36.7 (1.44)	26.6 (1.05)	96.2 (3.79)	53.0 (2.09)	24.8 (0.98)	33.4 (1.31)	45.4 (1.79)	49.0 (1.93)	66.2 (2.61)	65.9 (2.59)	582.5 (22.93)
Average snowfall cm (inches)	1.0 (0.4)	0.51 (0.2)	0.0 (0.0)	0.0 (0.0)	0.0 (0.0)	0.0 (0.0)	0.0 (0.0)	0.0 (0.0)	0.0 (0.0)	0.0 (0.0)	0.25 (0.1)	0.76 (0.3)	1.3 (0.5)
Average rainy days (≥ 0.1 mm)	19.7	11.9	11.4	9.6	11.0	9.4	6.6	8.5	9.6	9.8	13.9	13.5	134.9
Mean monthly sunshine hours	62	115	161	207	239	265	300	261	214	123	80	71	2,098
Mean daily sunshine hours	1.7	3.4	4.9	6.2	6.6	8.2	10.1	9.0	7.1	4.2	2.1	2.4	5.7
Average ultraviolet index	1	2	3	5	6	8	8	7	6	5	3	1	5
Source: Weatheronline.de, Meteociel.fr, weather-atlas, and wetterdienst

Climate data for Munich (Dreimühlenviertel), elevation: 515 m and 535 m, 1981–2010 normals, extremes 1954–present (Note: Two meteorological stations are responsible for the climatological data so that they are interpolated.)
Month	Jan	Feb	Mar	Apr	May	Jun	Jul	Aug	Sep	Oct	Nov	Dec	Year
Record high °C (°F)	18.9 (66.0)	21.4 (70.5)	24.0 (75.2)	32.2 (90.0)	31.8 (89.2)	35.2 (95.4)	37.5 (99.5)	37.0 (98.6)	31.8 (89.2)	28.2 (82.8)	24.2 (75.6)	21.7 (71.1)	37.5 (99.5)
Mean daily maximum °C (°F)	3.5 (38.3)	5.0 (41.0)	9.5 (49.1)	14.2 (57.6)	19.1 (66.4)	21.9 (71.4)	24.4 (75.9)	23.9 (75.0)	19.4 (66.9)	14.3 (57.7)	7.7 (45.9)	4.2 (39.6)	13.9 (57.0)
Daily mean °C (°F)	0.3 (32.5)	1.4 (34.5)	5.3 (41.5)	9.4 (48.9)	14.3 (57.7)	17.2 (63.0)	19.4 (66.9)	18.9 (66.0)	14.7 (58.5)	10.1 (50.2)	4.4 (39.9)	1.3 (34.3)	9.7 (49.5)
Mean daily minimum °C (°F)	−2.5 (27.5)	−1.9 (28.6)	1.6 (34.9)	4.9 (40.8)	9.4 (48.9)	12.5 (54.5)	14.5 (58.1)	14.2 (57.6)	10.5 (50.9)	6.6 (43.9)	1.7 (35.1)	−1.2 (29.8)	5.9 (42.6)
Record low °C (°F)	−22.2 (−8.0)	−25.4 (−13.7)	−16.0 (3.2)	−6.0 (21.2)	−2.3 (27.9)	1.0 (33.8)	6.5 (43.7)	4.8 (40.6)	0.6 (33.1)	−4.5 (23.9)	−11.0 (12.2)	−20.7 (−5.3)	−25.4 (−13.7)
Average precipitation mm (inches)	48 (1.9)	46 (1.8)	65 (2.6)	65 (2.6)	101 (4.0)	118 (4.6)	122 (4.8)	115 (4.5)	75 (3.0)	65 (2.6)	61 (2.4)	65 (2.6)	944 (37.2)
Mean monthly sunshine hours	79	96	133	170	209	210	238	220	163	125	75	59	1,777
Source 1: DWD
Source 2: SKlima.de

Climate data for Cologne/Bonn Airport 1991–2020, extremes 1957–present
Month	Jan	Feb	Mar	Apr	May	Jun	Jul	Aug	Sep	Oct	Nov	Dec	Year
Record high °C (°F)	16.2 (61.2)	21.0 (69.8)	25.3 (77.5)	30.8 (87.4)	34.4 (93.9)	36.8 (98.2)	40.3 (104.5)	38.8 (101.8)	33.1 (91.6)	27.6 (81.7)	20.2 (68.4)	16.7 (62.1)	40.3 (104.5)
Mean maximum °C (°F)	13.1 (55.6)	14.5 (58.1)	19.7 (67.5)	24.7 (76.5)	28.2 (82.8)	31.7 (89.1)	33.2 (91.8)	32.7 (90.9)	27.4 (81.3)	22.3 (72.1)	16.8 (62.2)	13.2 (55.8)	35.4 (95.7)
Mean daily maximum °C (°F)	5.9 (42.6)	7.2 (45.0)	11.4 (52.5)	16.1 (61.0)	19.7 (67.5)	22.7 (72.9)	24.9 (76.8)	24.5 (76.1)	20.4 (68.7)	15.2 (59.4)	9.8 (49.6)	6.5 (43.7)	15.4 (59.7)
Daily mean °C (°F)	3.0 (37.4)	3.6 (38.5)	6.7 (44.1)	10.4 (50.7)	14.1 (57.4)	17.1 (62.8)	19.0 (66.2)	18.5 (65.3)	14.8 (58.6)	10.8 (51.4)	6.7 (44.1)	3.8 (38.8)	10.7 (51.3)
Mean daily minimum °C (°F)	0.0 (32.0)	0.1 (32.2)	2.0 (35.6)	4.5 (40.1)	8.1 (46.6)	11.2 (52.2)	13.3 (55.9)	12.8 (55.0)	9.7 (49.5)	6.8 (44.2)	3.5 (38.3)	1.0 (33.8)	6.1 (42.9)
Mean minimum °C (°F)	−9.1 (15.6)	−8.0 (17.6)	−5.3 (22.5)	−3.1 (26.4)	0.9 (33.6)	5.2 (41.4)	7.7 (45.9)	6.9 (44.4)	3.7 (38.7)	−0.8 (30.6)	−3.8 (25.2)	−7.1 (19.2)	−11.8 (10.8)
Record low °C (°F)	−23.4 (−10.1)	−19.2 (−2.6)	−13.4 (7.9)	−8.8 (16.2)	−2.9 (26.8)	−0.5 (31.1)	2.9 (37.2)	1.9 (35.4)	−1.3 (29.7)	−6.0 (21.2)	−10.4 (13.3)	−18.0 (−0.4)	−23.4 (−10.1)
Average precipitation mm (inches)	61.7 (2.43)	53.8 (2.12)	55.0 (2.17)	48.2 (1.90)	62.1 (2.44)	86.3 (3.40)	87.4 (3.44)	83.3 (3.28)	66.9 (2.63)	64.7 (2.55)	63.5 (2.50)	69.2 (2.72)	802.1 (31.58)
Mean monthly sunshine hours	54.3	78.8	124.8	172.6	198.7	201.3	207.2	196.5	149.4	104.5	58.9	45.2	1,592.2
Source: Data derived from Deutscher Wetterdienst

Climate data for Frankfurt Airport 1981–2010, extremes 1949–present (sunshine duration and precipitation rounded)
Month	Jan	Feb	Mar	Apr	May	Jun	Jul	Aug	Sep	Oct	Nov	Dec	Year
Record high °C (°F)	15.9 (60.6)	19.1 (66.4)	24.7 (76.5)	30.3 (86.5)	33.2 (91.8)	39.3 (102.7)	40.2 (104.4)	38.7 (101.7)	32.8 (91.0)	28.0 (82.4)	19.1 (66.4)	16.3 (61.3)	40.2 (104.4)
Mean daily maximum °C (°F)	4.2 (39.6)	5.9 (42.6)	10.7 (51.3)	15.4 (59.7)	20.0 (68.0)	23.1 (73.6)	25.5 (77.9)	25.1 (77.2)	20.3 (68.5)	14.6 (58.3)	8.4 (47.1)	4.9 (40.8)	14.8 (58.6)
Daily mean °C (°F)	1.6 (34.9)	2.4 (36.3)	6.4 (43.5)	10.3 (50.5)	14.7 (58.5)	17.8 (64.0)	20.0 (68.0)	19.5 (67.1)	15.2 (59.4)	10.4 (50.7)	5.6 (42.1)	2.5 (36.5)	10.6 (51.1)
Mean daily minimum °C (°F)	−1.1 (30.0)	−1.1 (30.0)	2.1 (35.8)	4.9 (40.8)	9.1 (48.4)	12.3 (54.1)	14.4 (57.9)	14.0 (57.2)	10.5 (50.9)	6.6 (43.9)	2.8 (37.0)	−0.1 (31.8)	6.2 (43.2)
Record low °C (°F)	−21.6 (−6.9)	−19.6 (−3.3)	−13.0 (8.6)	−7.1 (19.2)	−2.8 (27.0)	0.1 (32.2)	2.8 (37.0)	2.5 (36.5)	−0.3 (31.5)	−6.3 (20.7)	−11.5 (11.3)	−17.0 (1.4)	−21.6 (−6.9)
Average precipitation mm (inches)	45 (1.8)	41 (1.6)	48 (1.9)	42 (1.7)	63 (2.5)	58 (2.3)	65 (2.6)	57 (2.2)	53 (2.1)	55 (2.2)	49 (1.9)	54 (2.1)	629 (24.8)
Average rainy days	16	13	14	14	15	15	14	14	12	12	14	16	169
Mean monthly sunshine hours	50	80	121	178	211	219	233	219	156	103	51	41	1,662
Percentage possible sunshine	18	29	33	42	45	46	47	51	40	30	19	16	35
Source 1: DWD
Source 2: Weather Atlas (sunshine data)

=== Land use of Germany ===
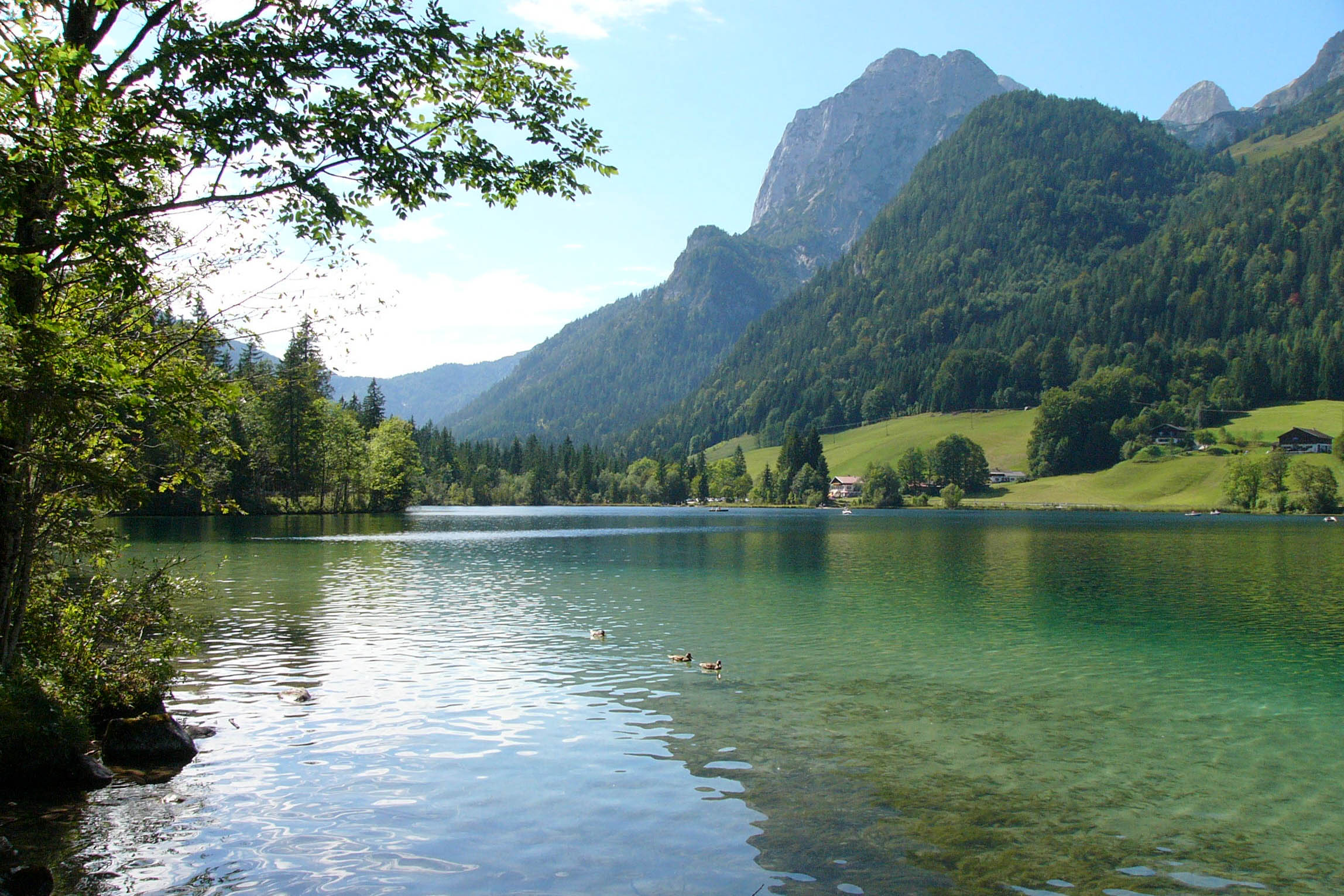
Alpine scenery in Bavaria

Germany covers a total of 357,600 km^{2} (138,100 sq mi), of which 5,157 km^{2} (1,991 sq mi) is irrigated land and 8,350 km^{2} (3,220 sq mi) is covered by water, the largest lakes being Lake Constance (total area of 536 km^{2} (207 sq mi), with 62% of the shore being German; international borders are not defined on the lake itself), Müritz (117 km^{2} or 45 sq mi) and Chiemsee (80 km^{2} or 31 sq mi). The majority of Germany is covered by either arable land (33.95%); permanent crops cover 0.57% of the land.

Germany has a total of 2,389 km (1,484 mi) of coastline and borders totaling 3,714 km (2,308 mi) (clockwise from north: Denmark 140 km (87 mi), Poland 467 km (290 mi), Czech Republic 704 km (437 mi), Austria 801 km (498 mi), Switzerland 348 km (216 mi), France 418 km (260 mi), Luxembourg 128 km (80 mi), Belgium 133 km (83 mi), Netherlands 575 km (357 mi)). The German-Austrian border crosses itself near Jungholz. The border with Belgium includes five German exclaves due to the Vennbahn railway line. The border with Switzerland includes the German exclave village of Büsingen am Hochrhein which is separated from the rest of Germany by a strip of Swiss territory 680 metres wide at its narrowest point.

=== Rivers ===
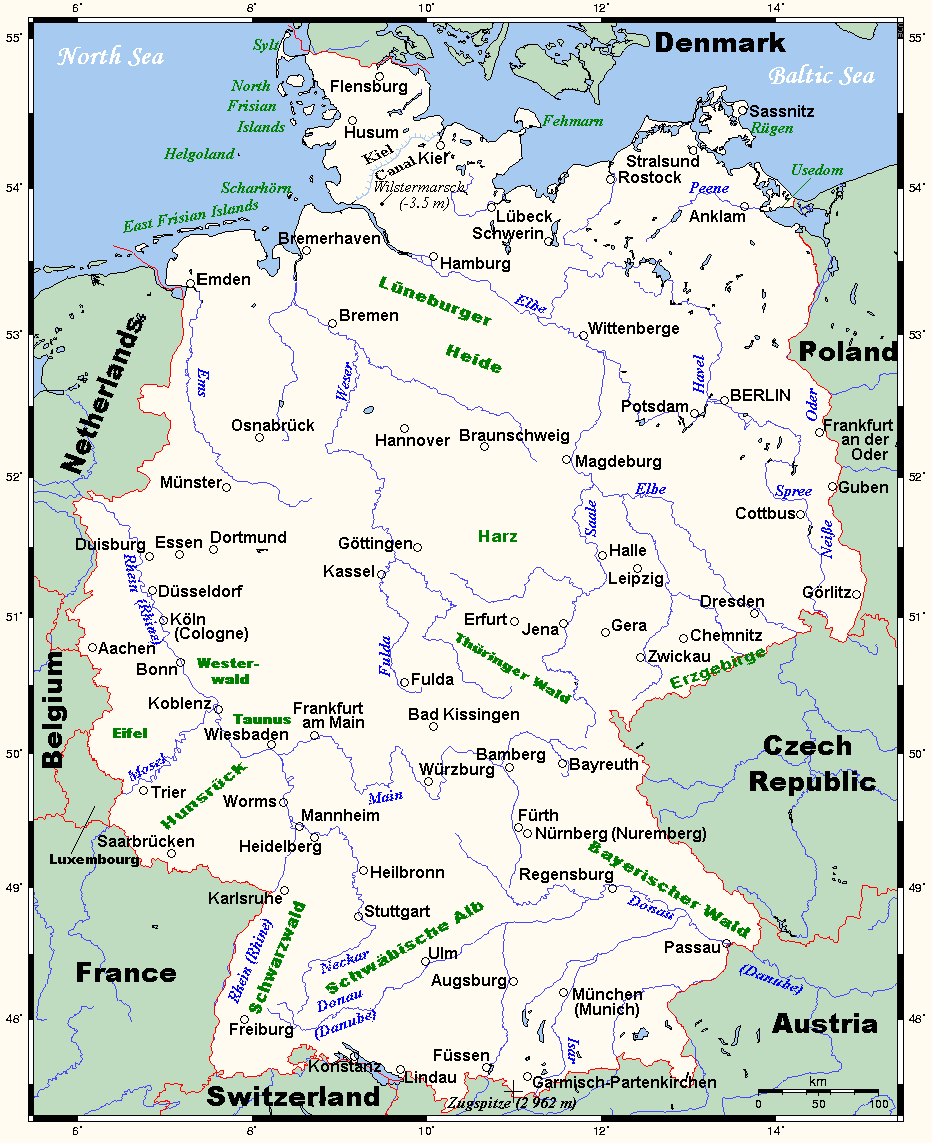
The major German rivers

The main rivers in Germany are:

- The Rhine (Rhein in German) with a German section extending 865 km (537 mi) (main tributaries including the Neckar, the Main and the Moselle (Mosel));
- The Elbe with a German section of 727 km (452 mi) (also drains into the North Sea); and
- The Danube (Donau) with a German length of 687 km (427 mi).

Further important rivers include the Saale and the Main in central Germany, the Neckar in the southwest, the Weser in the North and the Oder at the eastern border.

=== Caves ===
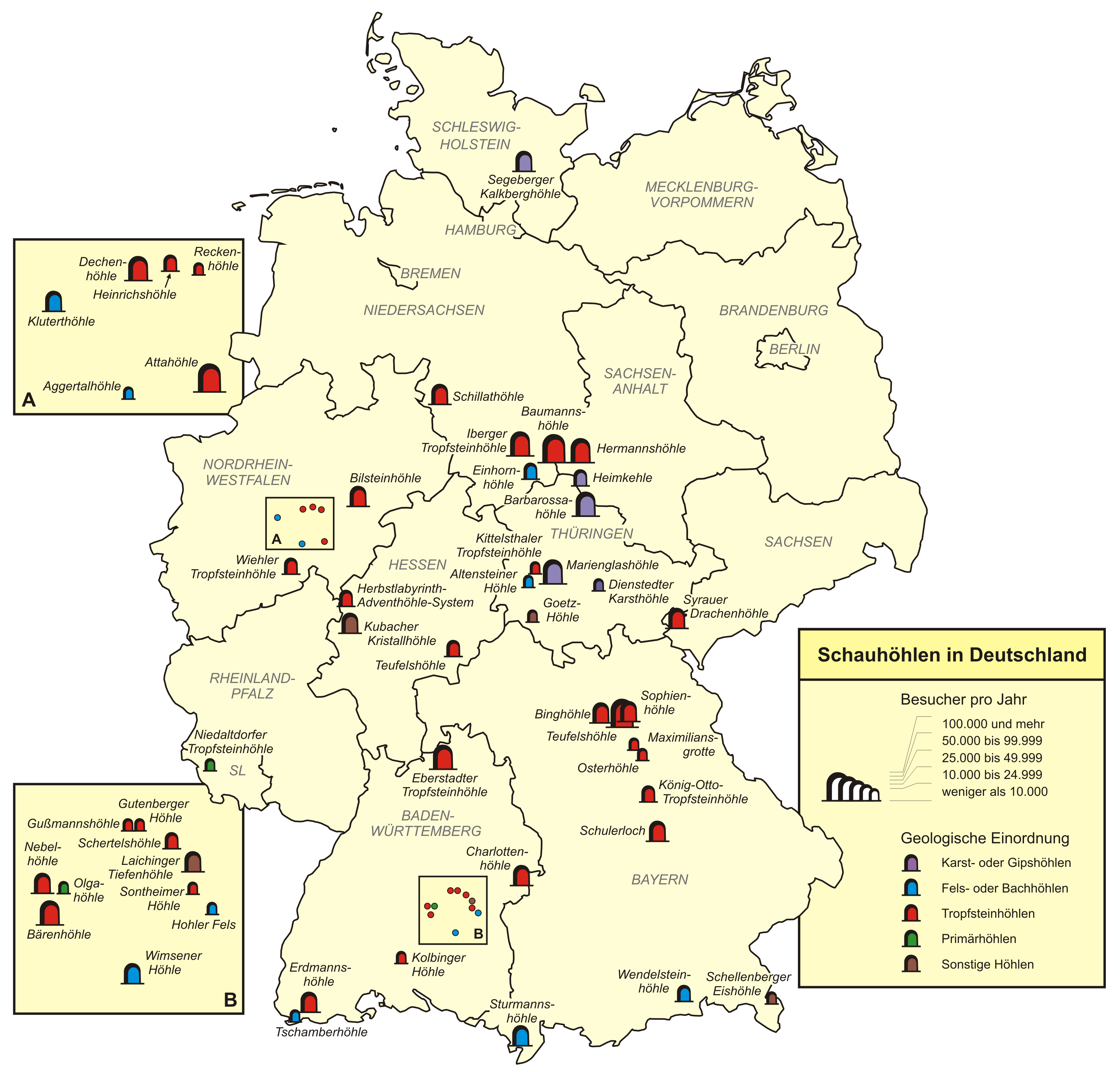
Show caves in Germany

Throughout the Karst rocks many caves were formed especially in the valley of the Hönne. The biggest culture cave of Europe is located in Balve.

=== Tidal flats ===
A recent global remote sensing analysis suggested that there were 2,783 km^{2} of tidal flats in Germany, making it the 11th ranked country in terms of how much tidal flat occurs there.

=== Natural resources ===
- Iron ore, coal, potash, timber, lignite, uranium, copper, petroleum, natural gas, salt, nickel, and water.

== Environment ==
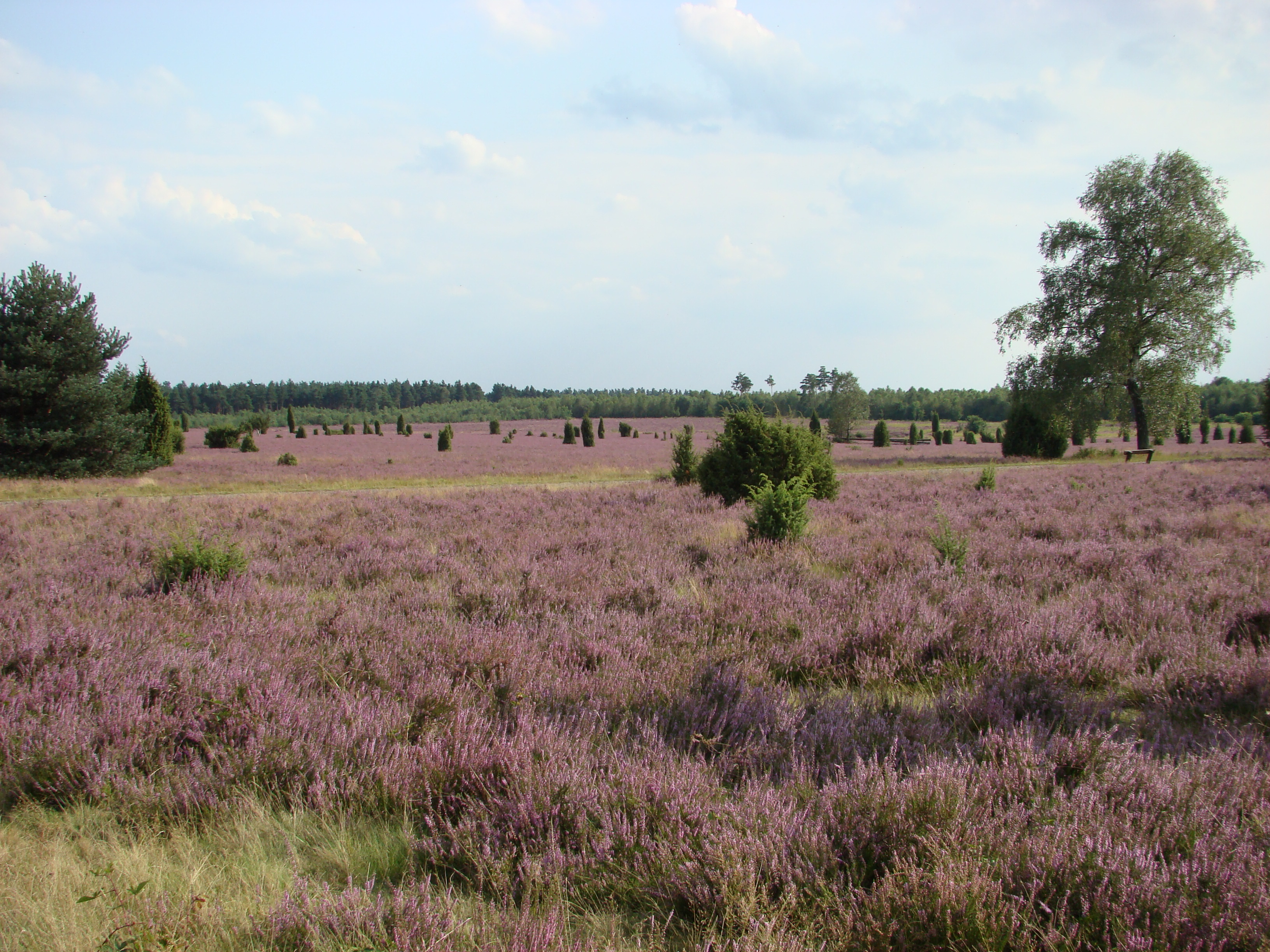
The Lüneburg Heath Nature Reserve in Lower Saxony

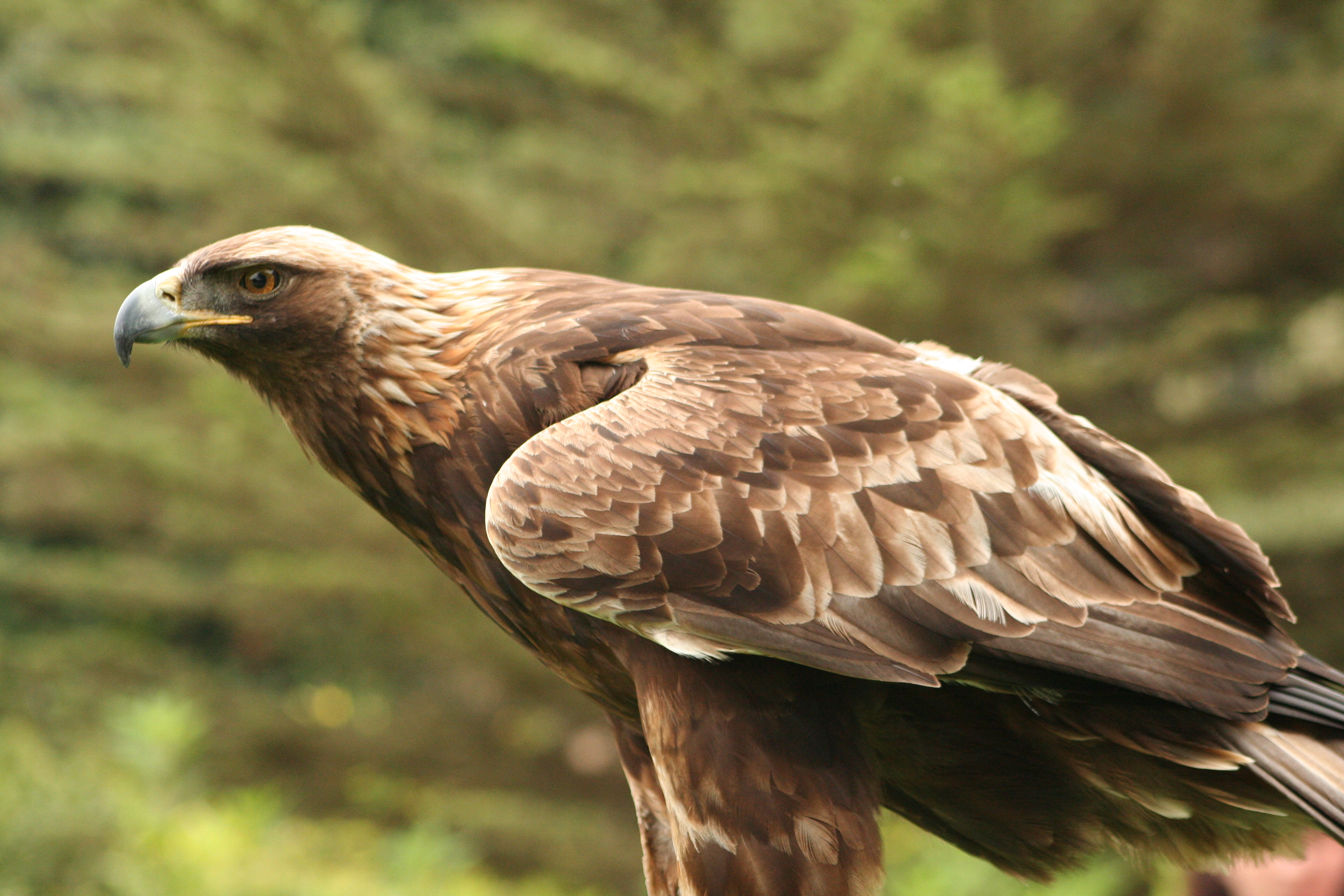
The golden eagle is a protected bird of prey.

Current issues

- Emissions from coal-burning utilities and industries contribute to air pollution; acid rain, resulting from sulphur dioxide emissions, is damaging forests in Germany; pollution in the Baltic Sea from raw sewage and industrial effluents from rivers in eastern Germany; hazardous waste disposal; government (under Chancellor Schröder, SPD) announced intent to end the use of nuclear power for producing electricity; government working to meet EU commitment to identify nature preservation areas in line with the EU's Flora, Fauna, and Habitat directive. Germany's last glacier is disappearing.

International agreements

- Party to treaties related to: air pollution, nitrogen oxides, persistent organic air pollutants, sulphur 85, sulphur 94, volatile organic compounds, Antarctic-Environmental Protocol, Antarctic Treaty, biodiversity, climate change, climate change-Kyoto Protocol, desertification, endangered species, environmental modification, hazardous wastes, law of the sea, marine dumping, nuclear test ban, ozone layer protection, ship pollution, Tropical Timber 83, Tropical Timber 94, wetlands, whaling
- Signed, but not ratified: none

Natural hazards

- Flooding through rivers after heavy rainfall, such as during the 2002 European floods, or storm surge, such as the North Sea flood of 1962 and the historic floods of 1362 and 1634 that changed the coastline of what is now the west coast of Schleswig-Holstein.

=== Flora and fauna ===
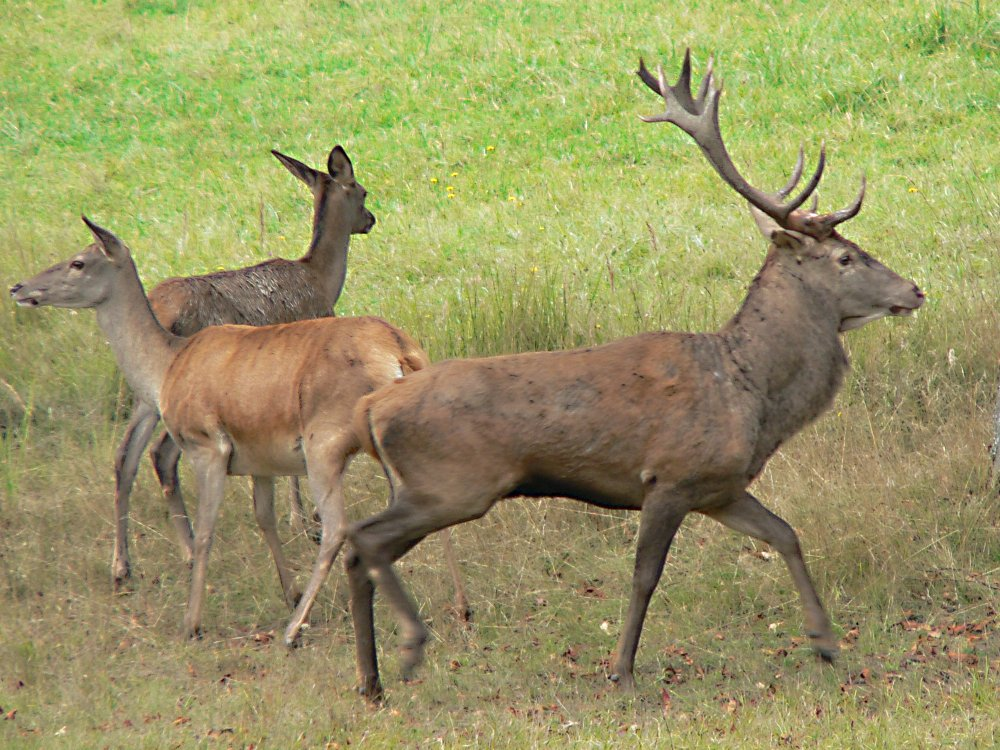
Deer are widespread.

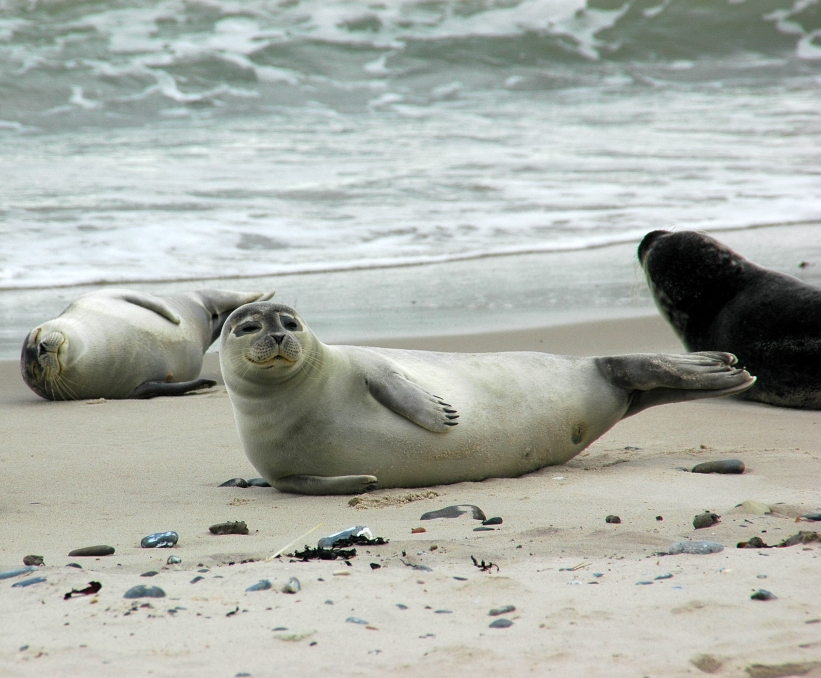

Phytogeographically, Germany is shared between the Atlantic European and Central European provinces of the Circumboreal Region within the Boreal kingdom. The territory of Germany can be subdivided into two ecoregions: European-Mediterranean montane mixed forests and Northeast-Atlantic shelf marine. The majority of Germany is covered by either arable land (33%) or forestry and woodland (31%). Only 15% is covered by permanent pastures.

The plants and animals of Germany are those generally common to central Europe. Beeches, oaks, and other deciduous trees constitute one-third of the forests; conifers are increasing as a result of reforestation. Spruce and fir trees predominate in the upper mountains, while pine and larch are found in sandy soil. There are many species of ferns, flowers, fungi, and mosses. Fish abound in the rivers and the North Sea. Wild animals include deer, wild boar, mouflon, fox, badger, hare, Eurasian lynx, and small numbers of beaver. Extinct/endangered animals include gray wolf, brown bear, and European bison. Various migratory birds cross Germany in the spring and autumn.

The national parks in Germany include the Wadden Sea National Parks, the Jasmund National Park, the Vorpommern Lagoon Area National Park, the Müritz National Park, the Lower Oder Valley National Park, the Harz National Park, the Saxon Switzerland National Park and the Bavarian Forest National Park.

Germany is known for its many zoological gardens, wildlife parks, aquaria, and bird parks. More than 400 registered zoos and animal parks operate in Germany, which is believed to be the largest number in any single country of the world. Berlin Zoo is the oldest zoo in Germany and presents the most comprehensive collection of species in the world.

In the warm regions of the south, subtropical plants and trees like the cactus and palm trees have been planted and multiplied naturally later, while typical middle European trees do also occur. This is only the case though in the Main, Rhine and Neckar valleys and the Lake Constance. In German, people refer to them as German Tuscany or German Riviera.

== Human geography ==
=== Demographics ===
Population density

With an estimated 83.2 million inhabitants in December 2020, Germany is the most populous country in the European Union and ranks as the 19th largest country in the world in terms of population. Its population density stands at 233 inhabitants per square kilometre (600/sq mi). The United Nations Population Fund lists Germany as host to the second-highest number of international migrants worldwide, around 23% of Germany's population do not hold a German passport or are direct descendants of immigrants. The number of third and subsequent generations of immigrants are not statistically recorded.

=== Administrative divisions ===
Germany comprises sixteen states that are collectively referred to as Länder. Each state has its own state constitution and is largely autonomous in regard to its internal organisation. Due to differences in size and population the subdivision of these states varies, especially between city states (Stadtstaaten) and states with larger territories (Flächenländer). For regional administrative purposes five states, namely Baden-Württemberg, Bavaria, Hesse, North Rhine-Westphalia and Saxony, consist of a total of 22 Government Districts (Regierungsbezirke). As of July 2021 Germany is divided into 400 districts (Kreise) on municipal level, these consist of 294 rural districts and 106 urban districts.

State	Capital	Area (km^{2})	Population
Baden-Württemberg	Stuttgart	35,752	11,103,043
Bavaria	Munich	70,549	13,140,183
Berlin	Berlin	892	3,664,088
Brandenburg	Potsdam	29,477	2,531,071
Bremen	Bremen	404	680,130
Hamburg	Hamburg	755	1,852,478
Hesse	Wiesbaden	21,115	6,293,154
Mecklenburg-Vorpommern	Schwerin	23,174	1,610,774
Lower Saxony	Hanover	47,618	8,003,421
North Rhine-Westphalia	Düsseldorf	34,043	17,925,570
Rhineland-Palatinate	Mainz	19,847	4,098,391
Saarland	Saarbrücken	2,569	983,991
Saxony	Dresden	18,416	4,056,941
Saxony-Anhalt	Magdeburg	20,445	2,180,684
Schleswig-Holstein	Kiel	15,763	2,910,875
Thuringia	Erfurt	16,172	2,120,237

=== Urbanization ===
Germany has a number of large cities; the most populous with more than 500,000 inhabitants are: Berlin, Hamburg, Munich, Cologne, Frankfurt, Düsseldorf, Leipzig, Stuttgart, Dortmund, Bremen, Essen, Dresden, Nuremberg, Hanover and Duisburg. The largest conurbation is the Rhine-Ruhr region (12 million), including Düsseldorf (the capital of North Rhine-Westphalia), Cologne, Dortmund, Essen, Duisburg, and Bochum.

== Gallery ==
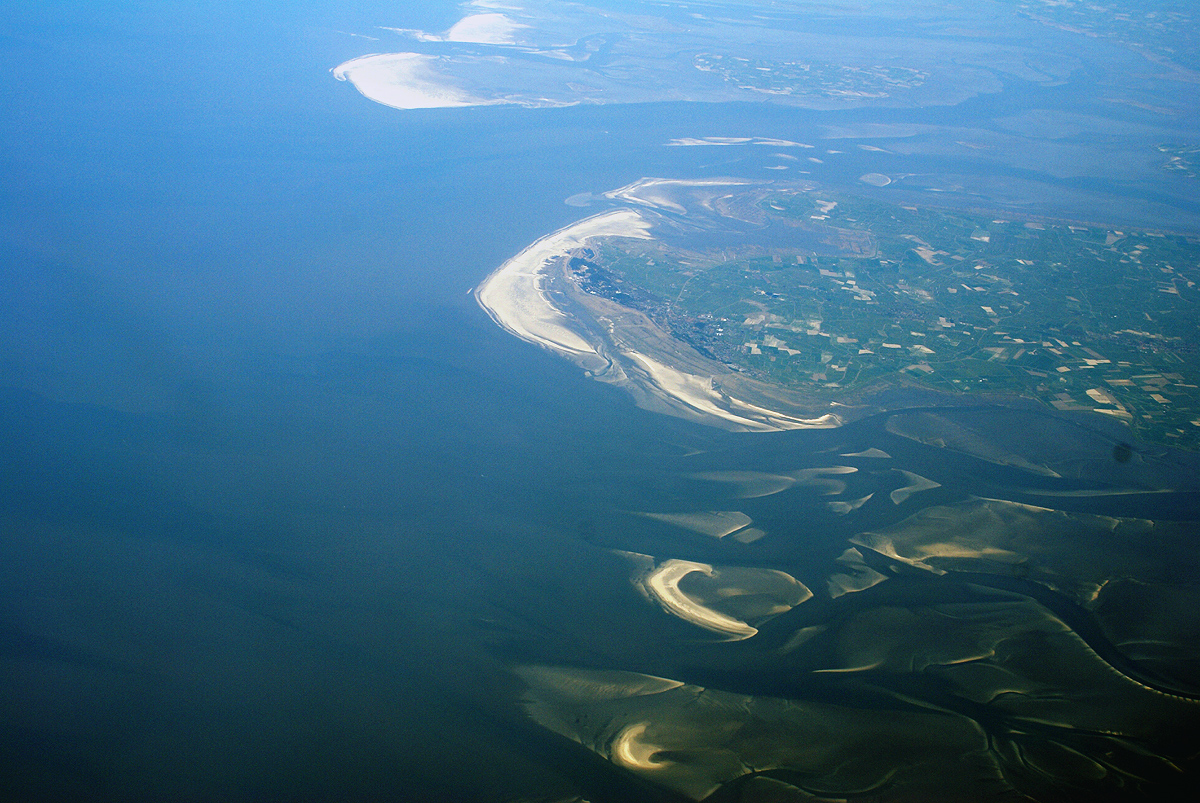
Schleswig-Holstein Wadden Sea National Park

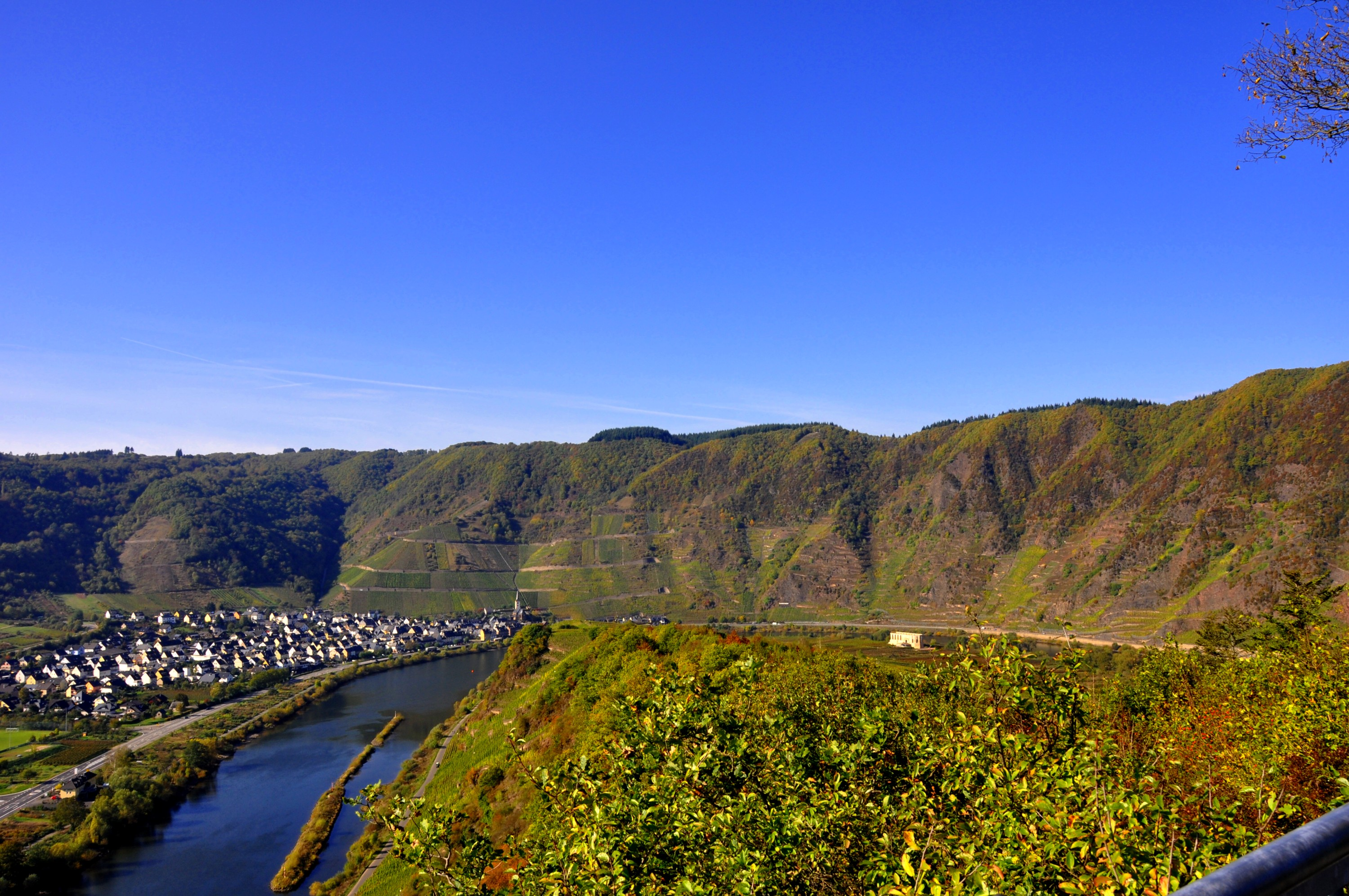
View over the Moselle and past the village of Dorf Bremm to the Calmont in the Eifel

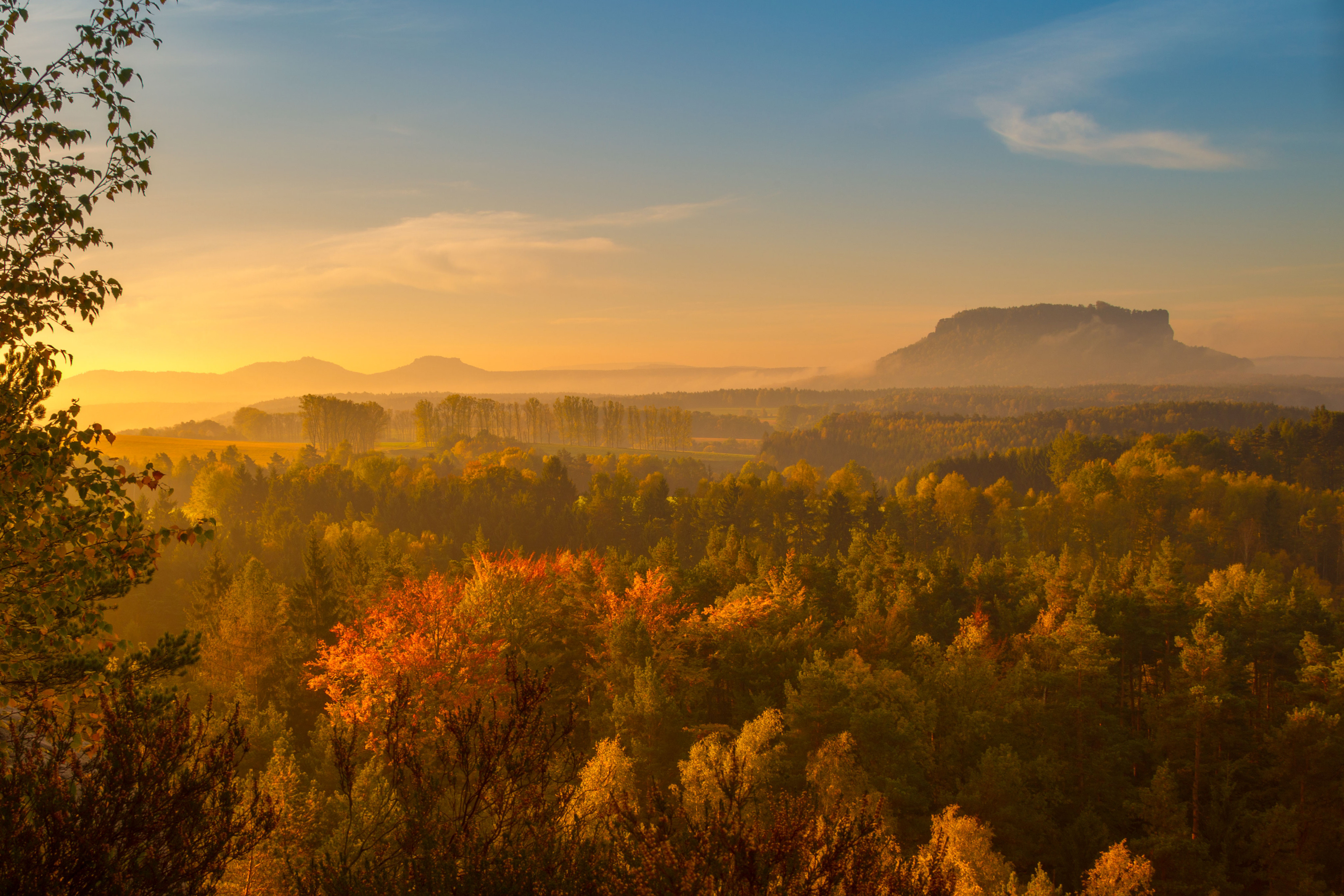
Lilienstein at Saxon Switzerland

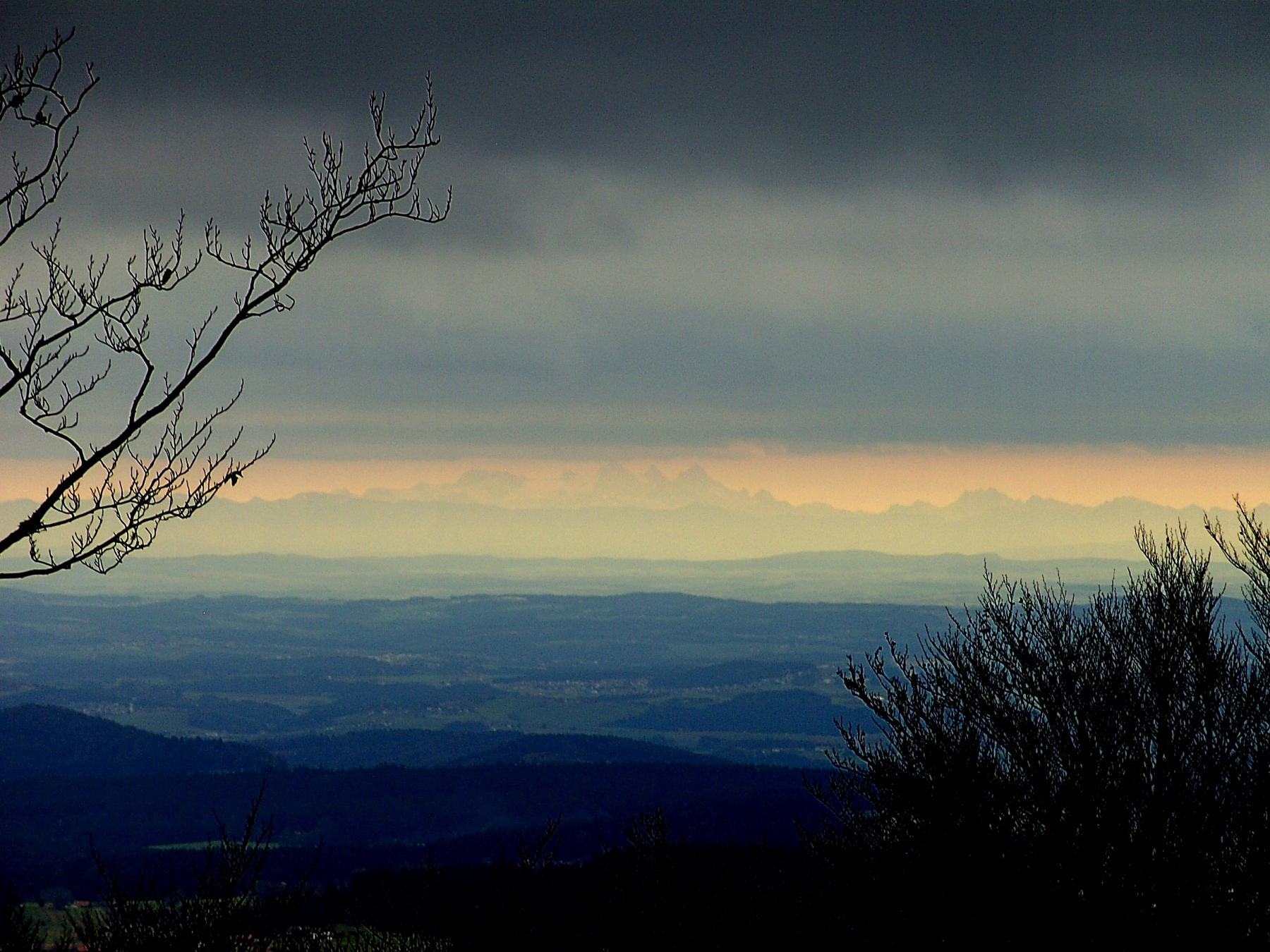
View from Mount Lusen in the Bavarian Forest over the Alpine Foreland

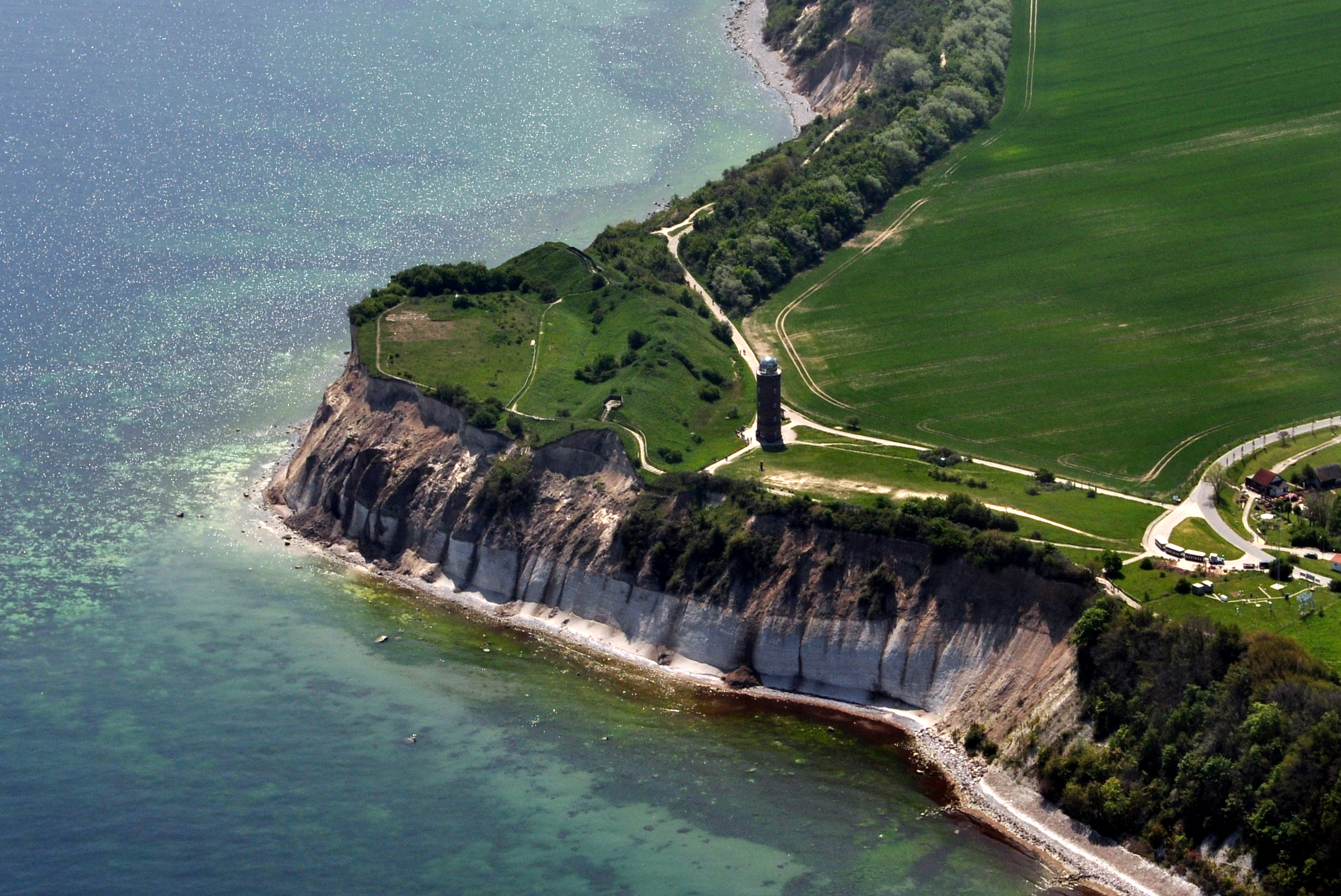
Cape Arkona on the island of Rügen

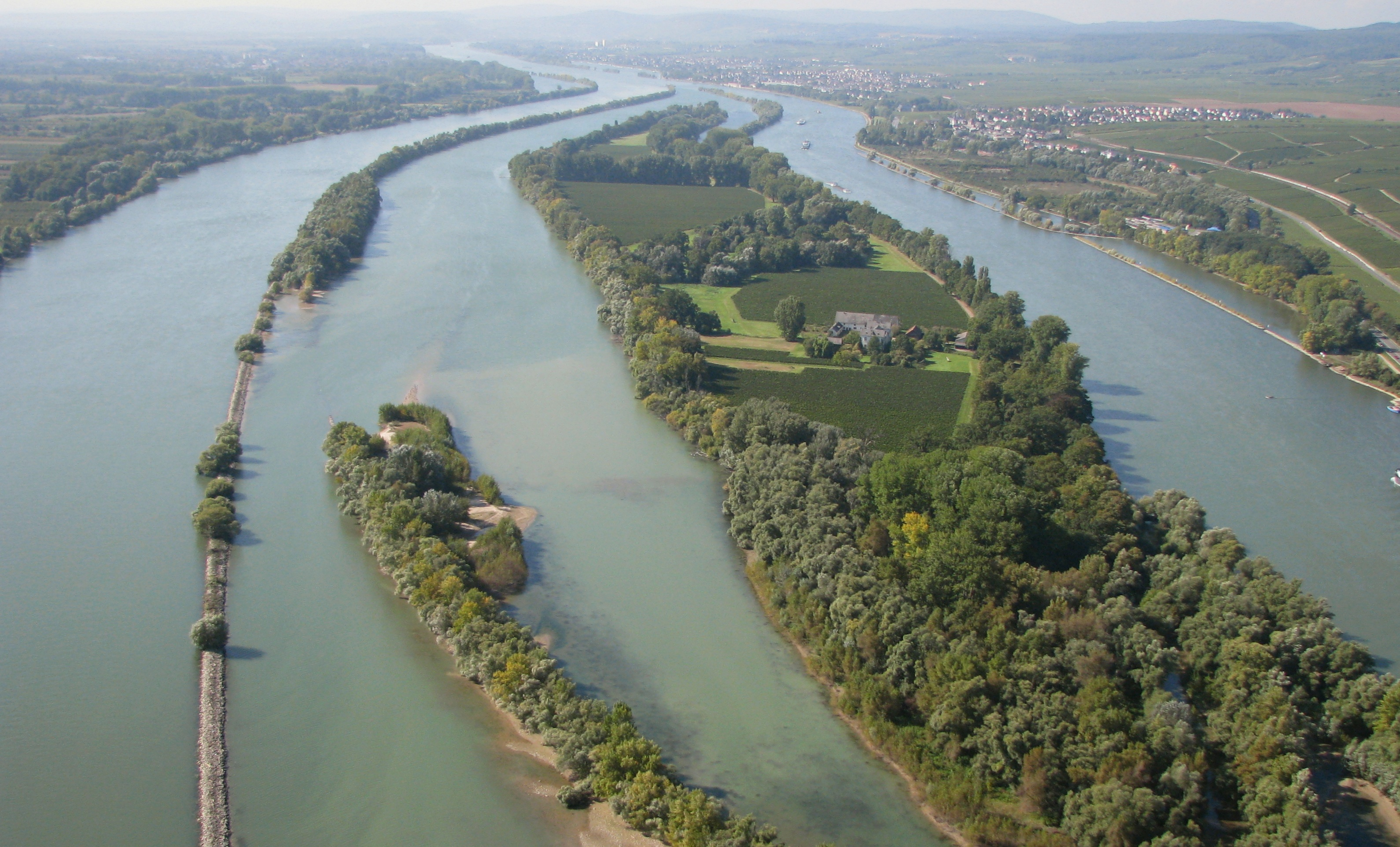
Rhine at Eltville and Bingen

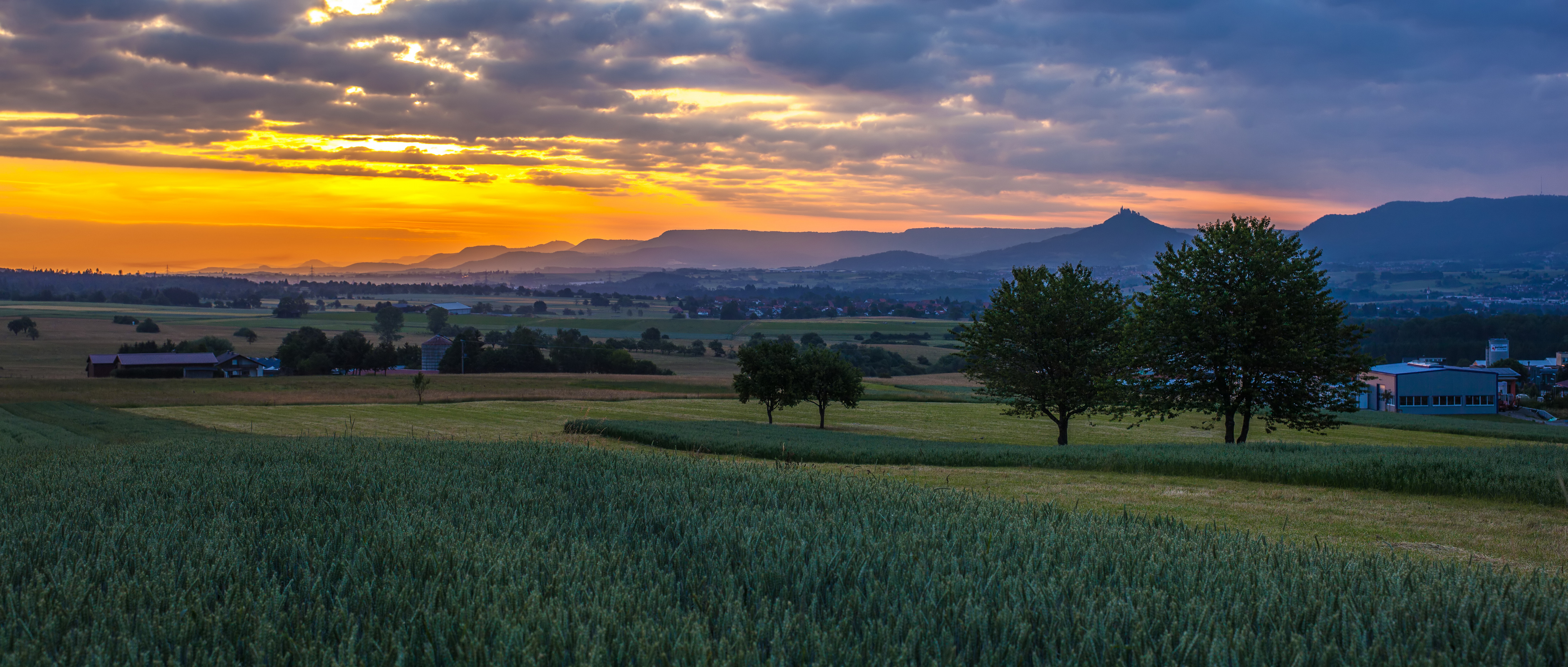
Swabian Jura

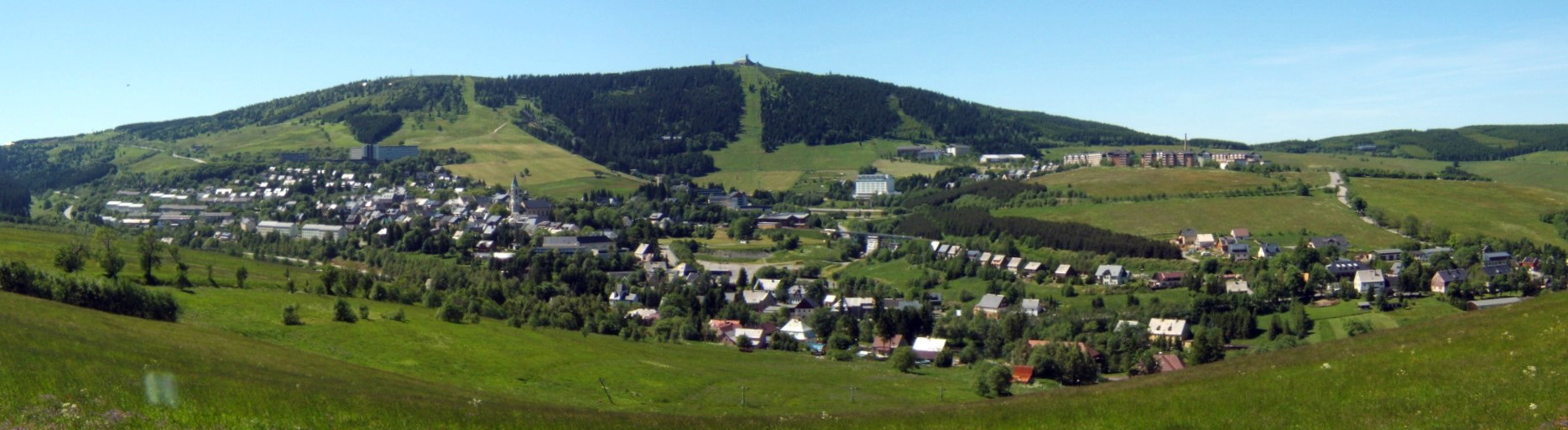
View from the Fichtelberg mountain in the Ore Mountains

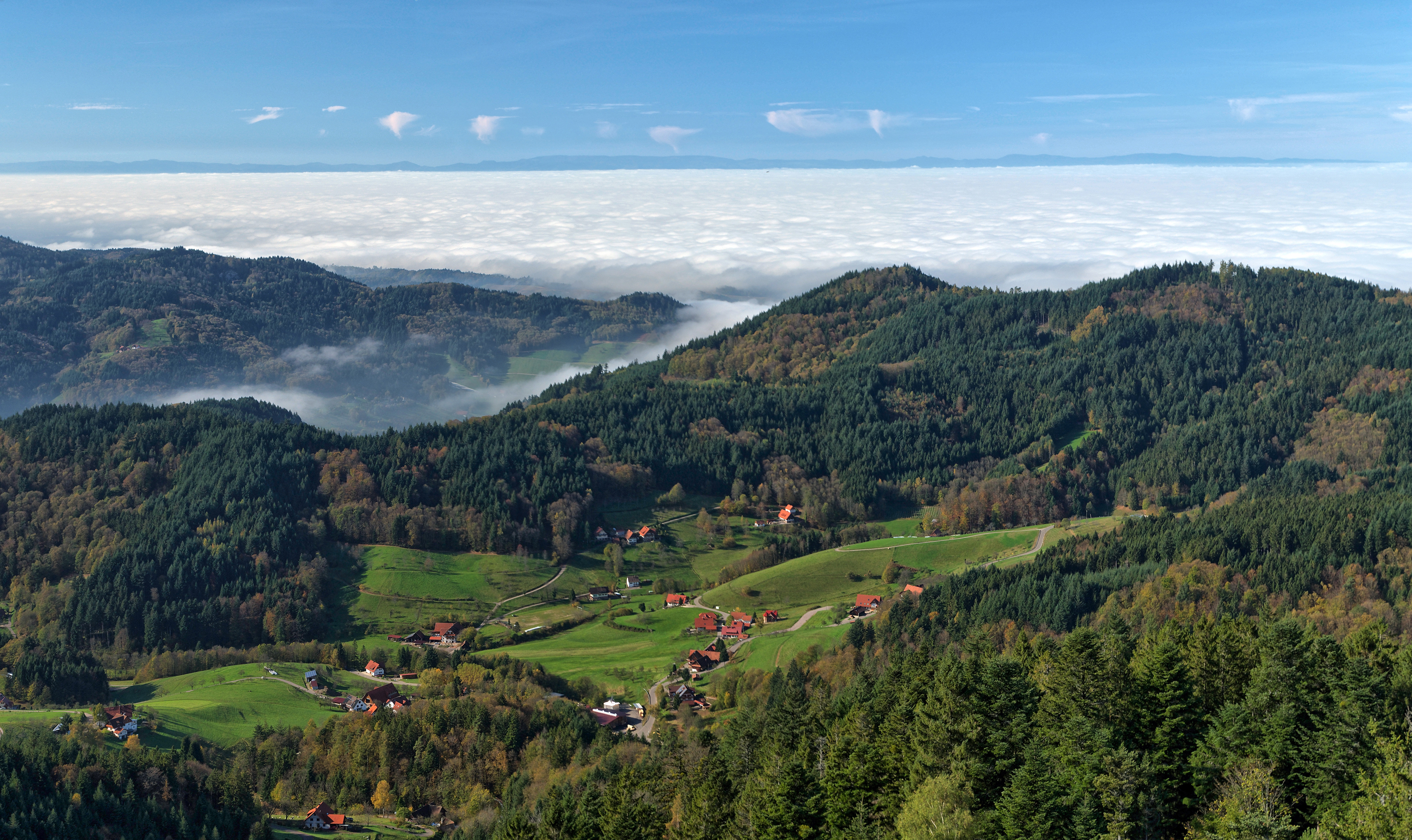
Black Forest near Seebach

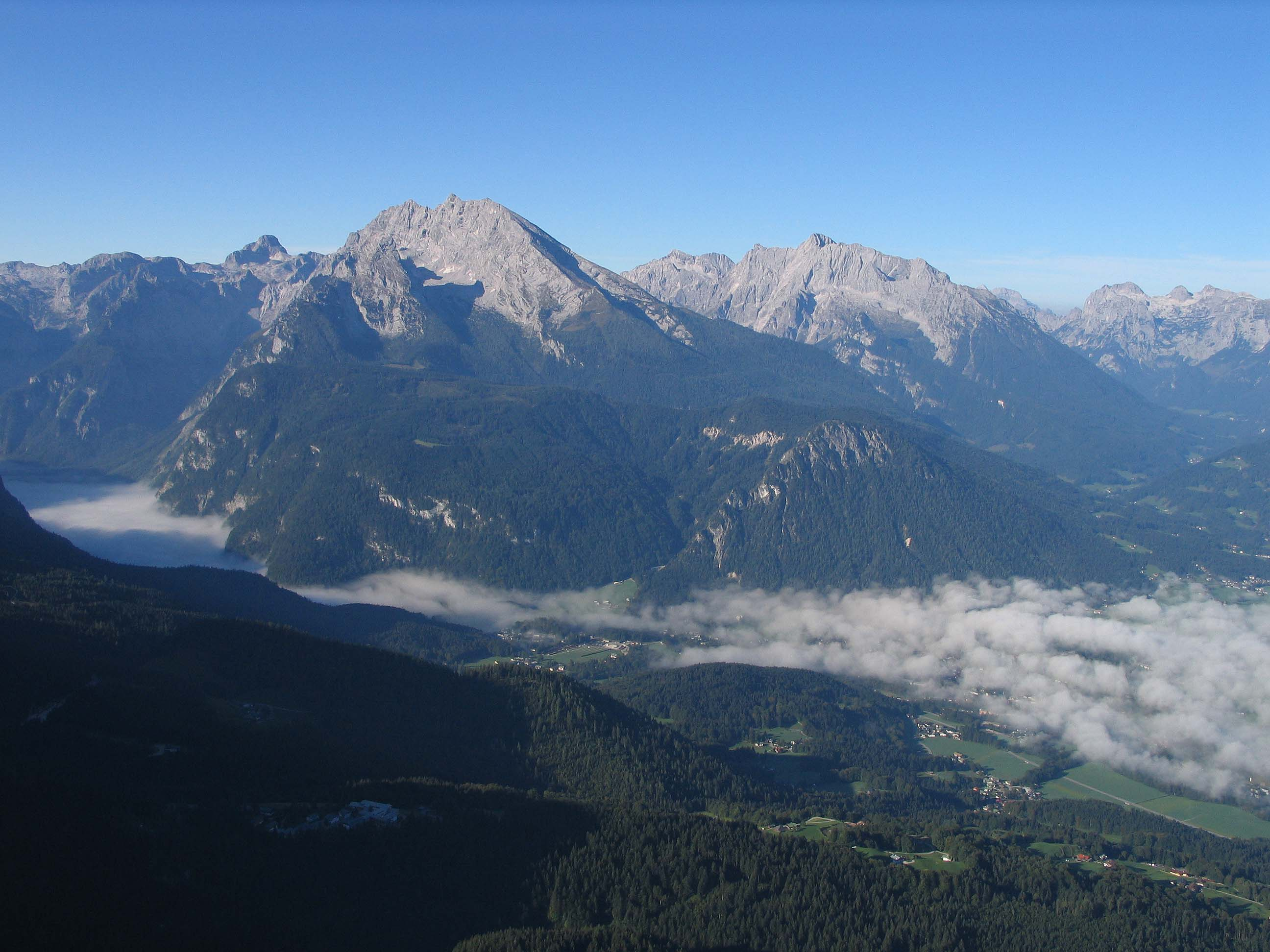
View of the Berchtesgaden Alps

== See also ==
- Forest in Germany
  - History
  - Culture
- Natural regions of Germany
  - Saxony
  - Schleswig-Holstein
  - Prealps / Hügelland / Mittelgebirge
- Natural Reserves
  - Biosphere Reserves
  - List of national parks of Germany
  - List of nature parks in Germany
