= German Forest =

Setting in 19th century German Romanticism

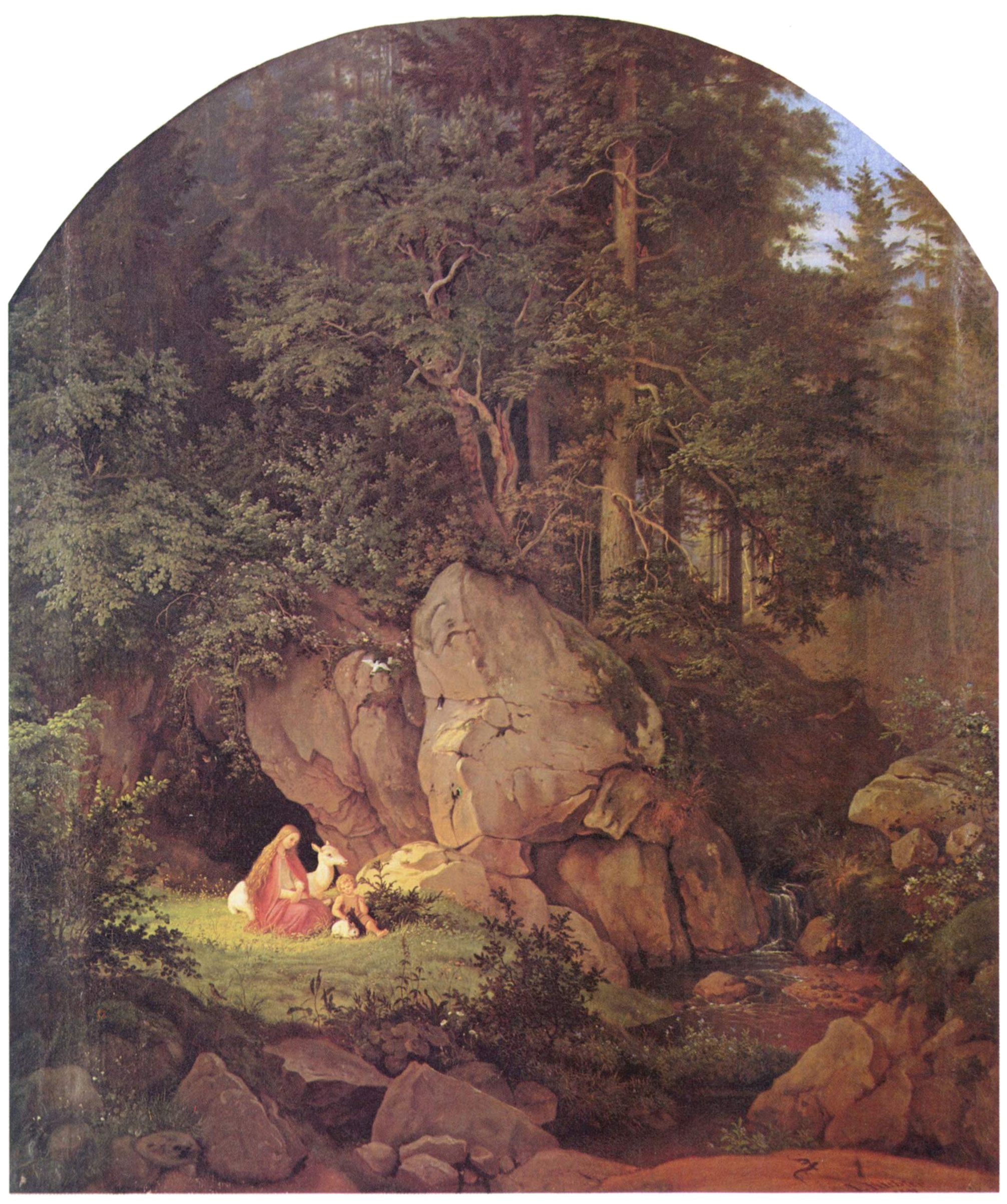
Adrian Ludwig Richter: Genoveva in der Waldeinsamkeit, 1841

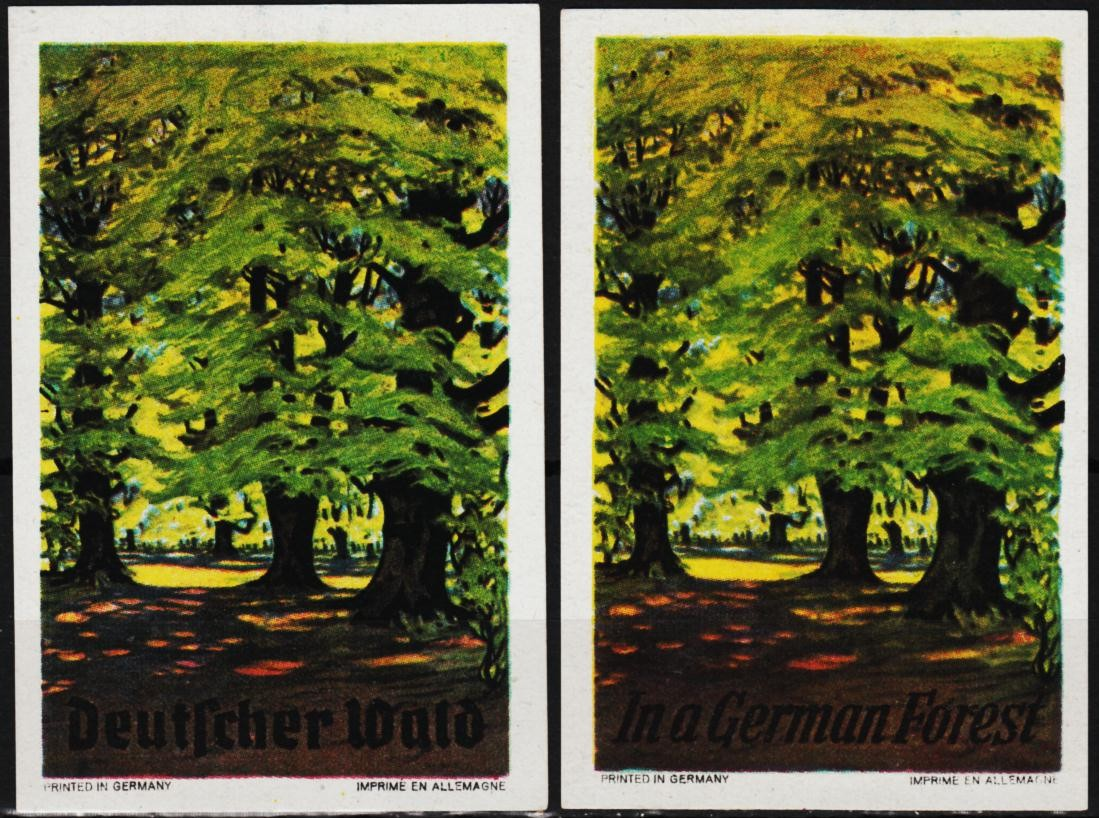
Two Poster stamps called Deutscher Wald and "In a German Forest", about 1928 by Otto Altenkirch

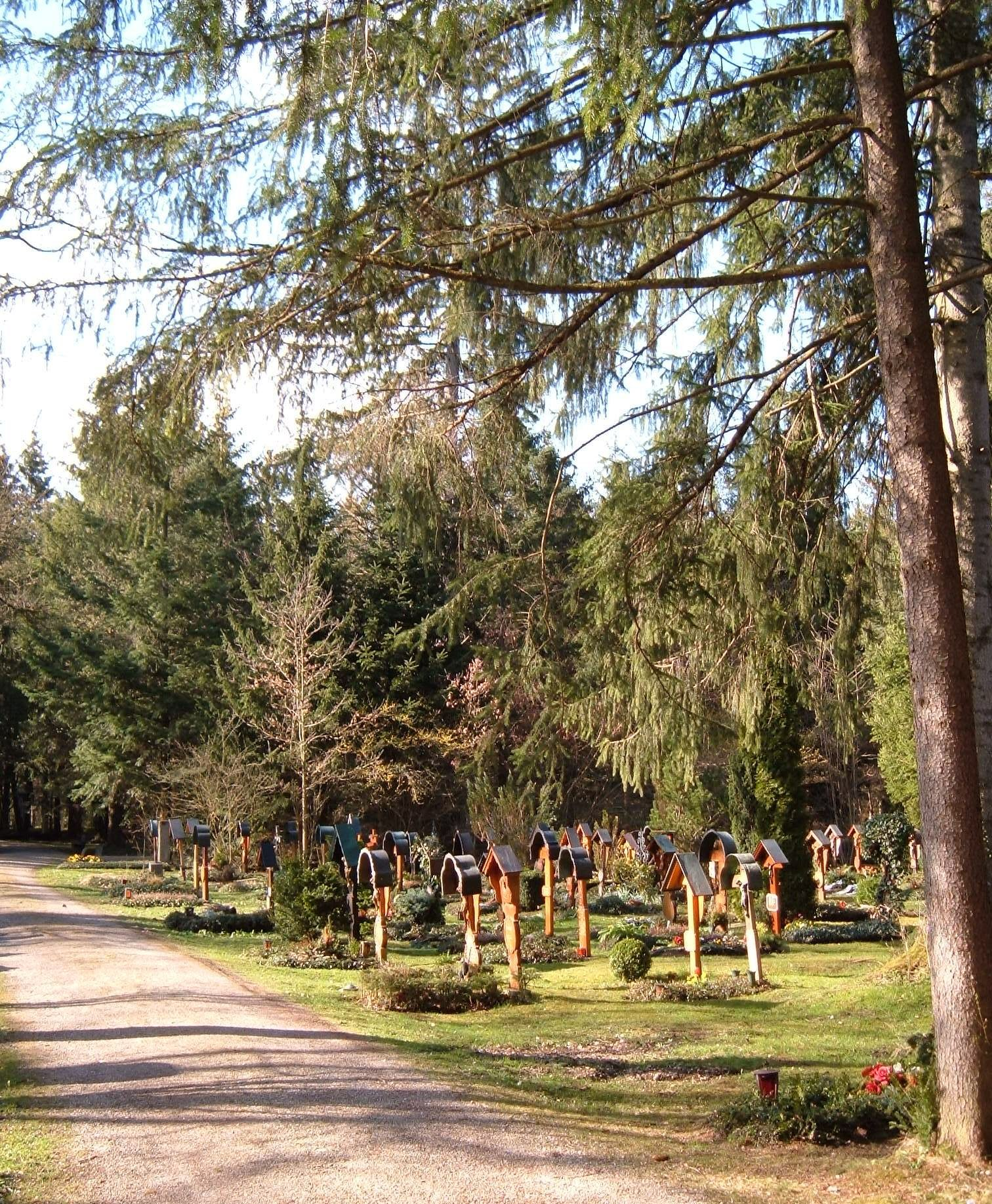
A woodland cemetery

The German Forest (German: Deutscher Wald) was a phrase used both as a metaphor as well as to describe in exaggerated terms an idyllic landscape in German poems, fairy tales and legends of the early 19th-century Romantic period. Historical and cultural discourses declared it as the symbol of Germanic-German art and culture, or as in the case of Heinrich Heine or Madame de Staël, as a counter-image of French urbanity. It was also used with reference to historical or legendary events in German forests, such as Tacitus' description of the Battle of the Teutoburg Forest or even the nature mysticism of the stylized Germanic national myth, the Nibelungenlied as the history of its multi-faceted reception shows.

The early conservation and environmental movement, the tourism that was already under way in the 19th century, the youth movement, the social democratic Friends of Nature, the Wandervögel youth groups, the hiking clubs and the right-wing Völkisch movement saw in forests an important element of German cultural landscapes.

== State-controlled forests ==
Nachhaltigkeit is the German principle for sustainability, which has been used throughout history and is at the core values of German forestry as a whole. Nachhaltigkeit is what the German forests are famous for throughout the globe, and in terms of environmental practices. German forests in particular through the 19th century had state-issued guards in the forests across Germany, limiting access to citizens in order to preserve resources. This practice helped cut down on deforestation, though like the majority of the western world at this time, did not completely work. This was partly due to the extensive manicuring of the forests, including the rigid structure of growing trees in rows and clearing any underbrush. This weakened the natural ecosystem of the forests, and made the trees more prone to pests and disease.

== Literature ==
Germany's strict control over its forests allowed for the ideal of German romantic forests, that were idolized and used in literature to show the beauty and magic of nature. Many fairy tales have been inspired by the German forests, such as works from Brothers Grimm and Herder. Musicians such as Johannes Brahms, Richard Wagner, and Franz Schubert have also written works about German forests. Core ideas in these writings are love for Germany and the forests, unity, brooding, and magic. It can be said that these themes showed unity for Germany as a whole, while describing the forests similarly. The setting for these fairy tales are commonly the Black Forest of Germany, though the location of other fairy tales can vary in Germany's many forests.

== Nazi regime ==
During the Nazi regime, the idea of conservationism for German forests coincided with the Nazi propaganda attacking liberal values. The Nazis used the phrase Naturgemäße Waldwirtschaft ("forestry according to nature") to explain that they were merely restoring Germany back to its purest form. Many minorities would hide in the forests for protection from those less familiar with the land, and Hitler called the forest a hiding place for weak ethnic groups. Even so, the Nazi regime tried to protect German forests and saw them as a symbol of national excellence in their purity. But the Nazi conservation efforts were undermined by military plans.

In Nazi ideology, the motif of the "German Forest" was comparable to their "Blood and Soil" slogan, a typical Germanic symbol. Propaganda, political symbolism and landscape planning drew on this as a central theme for the period after a German victory.

== Recent times ==
Albrecht Lehmann has postulated a continuity of romantic forest idealism in the German peoples, transcending class and generation, from the Romantic period through the 21st century. Examples of the intense and distinctive handling of the cultural forest include the discussion of environmental damage and forest dieback, and the forms of commemoration and mourning associated with woodland cemeteries and natural burials.

Polls identify a uniquely German concept of the equivalence of forest and nature. The forest as an educational medium and healthy environment, in the context of environmental education, has a particular significance in the German-speaking region (see also forest education and forest kindergarten).

== See also ==
- Forest in Germany
- History of the forest in Central Europe
- Royal forests

== Literature References ==
- Wilson, Jeffrey K. The German Forest: Nature, Identity, and the Contestation of a National Symbol, 1871-1914. Toronto: University of Toronto Press, 2012.
- Ursula Breymayer, Bernd Ulrich: Unter Bäumen. Die Deutschen und ihr Wald. Sandstein Verlag, Dresden, 2011. ISBN 978-3-942422-70-3.
- Kenneth S. Calhoon / Karla L. Schultz (eds.): The Idea of the Forest. German and American Perspectives on the Culture and Politics of Trees, New York etc., 1996 (= German Life and Civilization, 14).
- Roderich von Detten (ed.): Und ewig sterben die Wälder. Wie die Debatte zum Waldsterben das Land veränderte, oekom Verlag Munich, 2012. ISBN 978-3-86581-448-7.
- K. Jan Oosthoek, Richard Hölzl (eds.), Managing Northern Europe's Forests. Histories from the Age of Improvement to the Age of Ecology, Berghahn, Oxford/New York, 2018, ISBN 978-1-78533-600-3.
- Richard Hölzl, Historicizing Sustainability. German scientific forestry in the 18th and 19th centuries", Science as Culture 19/4, 2010, pp. 431-460
- Christian Heger: Der Wald - eine mythische Zone. Zur Motivgeschichte des Waldes in der Literatur des 19. und 20. Jahrhunderts . In: Ders.: Im Schattenreich der Fiktionen. Studien zur phantastischen Motivgeschichte und zur unwirtlichen (Medien-)Moderne. AVM, Munich, 2010, ISBN 978-3-86306-636-9, pp. 61-85.
- Ute Jung-Kaiser (ed.): Der Wald als romantischer Topos. 5. Interdisziplinäres Symposium der Hochschule für Musik und Darstellende Kunst Frankfurt am Main 2007. Peter Lang Verlag, Berne etc., 2008, ISBN 978-3-03-911636-2.
- Albrecht Lehmann: Von Menschen und Bäumen. Die Deutschen und ihr Wald. Rowohlt, Reinbek bei Hamburg, 1999, ISBN 3-498-03891-5.
- Albrecht Lehmann, Klaus Schriewer (eds.): Der Wald - Ein deutscher Mythos? Perspektiven eines Kulturthemas. Reimer, Berlin and Hamburg, 2000, ISBN 3-496-02696-0 (Lebensformen, 16).
- Carl W. Neumann: 'Das Buch vom deutschen Wald - Ein Führer zu Heimatliebe und Naturschutz', Verlag Georg Dollheimer, Leipzig, 1935, http://d-nb.info/361261470.
- Erhard Schütz: "In den Wäldern selig verschollen. Waldgänger in der deutschen Literatur seit der Romantik" . Pressburger Akzente, Heft 3. Edition Lumiere, Bremen, 2013, ISBN 978-3-943245-12-7
- Ann-Kathrin Thomm (ed.): Mythos Wald. Begleitbuch zur gleichnamigen Wanderausstellung des LWL-Museumsamtes für Westfalen. Münster, 2009, ISBN 3-927204-69-2.
- Viktoria Urmersbach: Im Wald, da sind die Räuber. Eine Kulturgeschichte des Waldes. Vergangenheitsverlag, Berlin, 2009, ISBN 978-3-940621-07-8
- Bernd Weyergraf (ed.): Waldungen: Die Deutschen und ihr Wald. Ausstellungskatalog der Akademie der Künste. Nicolai, Berlin, 1987, ISBN 3-87584-215-4 (Akademie-Katalog 149).
- Johannes Zechner: Der deutsche Wald. Eine Ideengeschichte zwischen Poesie und Ideologie 1800–1945, WBG, Darmstadt, 2016. ISBN 978-3-805-34980-2.
- Johannes Zechner: ‚Die grünen Wurzeln unseres Volkes‘: Zur ideologischen Karriere des ‚deutschen Waldes‘. In Uwe Puschner and G. Ulrich Großmann (eds.): Völkisch und national. Zur Aktualität alter Denkmuster im 21. Jahrhundert. Wiss. Buchgesellschaft, Darmstadt, 2009. ISBN 978-3-534-20040-5 (Wissenschaftliche Beibände zum Anzeiger des Germanischen Nationalmuseums, 29), pp. 79–194
- Johannes Zechner: „Ewiger Wald und ewiges Volk“: Die Ideologisierung des deutschen Waldes im Nationalsozialismus. Freising, 2006, ISBN 3-931472-14-0 (Beiträge zur Kulturgeschichte der Natur, 15).
- *Johannes Zechner: Politicized Timber: The 'German Forest' and the Nature of the Nation 1800-1945. In: The Brock Review 11.2 (2011), pp. 19-32.
- Johannes Zechner: From Poetry to Politics. The Romantic Roots of the "German Forest". In: William Beinart / Karen Middleton / Simon Pooley (ed.): Wild Things. Nature and the Social Imagination, White Horse Press Cambridge 2013. ISBN 978-1-87426775-1. S. 185-210.
- Speziell die subjektive und kollektive Bedeutung des Kulturmusters „deutscher Wald“ wurde im Rahmen zweier von der DFG geförderten volkskundlicher Forschungsprojekte untersucht. DFG-Projekt Lebensstichwort Wald - Gegenwartsbezogene und historische Untersuchungen zur kulturellen Bedeutung von Wald
