= Ute Jung-Kaiser =

German musicologist and music historian

Ute Jung-Kaiser, née Jung (born 16 April 1942) is a German musicologist.

== Life and work ==
Born in Essen, Jung-Kaiser completed studies for the teaching profession at grammar schools in Cologne. After her first Staatsexamen in the fields of musicology, German studies, philosophy and school music she was awarded a Doctorate in 1968. She passed the second Staatsexamen in 1975. In 1981 she received her habilitation in historical musicology at the University of Hamburg.

From 1983 to 1996 she was professor of music education at the University of Music and Performing Arts Munich and then at the Frankfurt University of Music and Performing Arts until her retirement in 2007.

She researched historical musicology from the 18th to the 20th century and published numerous monographs on Thomas Mann, Richard Wagner, Walter Braunfels, Wolfgang Amadeus Mozart, Franz Schubert, Joseph von Eichendorff, Ludwig van Beethoven, Georg Friedrich Händel, Gustav Mahler and Frédéric Chopin.

== Publications ==
Monographs

- Die Musikphilosophie Thomas Manns. Gustav Bosse Verlag, Regensburg 1969.
- Die Rezeption der Kunst Richard Wagners in Italien. Gustav Bosse Verlag, Regensburg 1974, ISBN 3-7649-2076-9.
- Walter Braunfels (1882–1954). Gustav Bosse Verlag, Regensburg 1980, ISBN 3-7649-2215-X.
- Kunstwege zu Mozart. Bildnerische Deutungen vom Rokoko bis heute. Lang, Berlin 2003, ISBN 3-03910-093-9.
- Wolfgang Amadeus Mozart. Così fan tutte. Die Treuprobe im Spiegel der Musik. Wißner-Verlag, Augsburg 2004, ISBN 3-89639-442-8.
- Der Wald als romantischer Topos. 5. Interdisziplinäres Symposion der Hochschule für Musik und Darstellende Kunst. Lang, Berlin among others 2007, ISBN 978-3-03911-636-2.
- Der Sänger Franz Schubert. Seelische Virtuosität in Text, Musik und Bild. Lit Verlag, Münster 2013, ISBN 978-3-643-11701-4.

Publisher

- Der kulturpädagogische Auftrag der Musik im 20. Jahrhundert. Bericht über das Symposion vom 14.–15. Juli 1989 in der Hochschule für Musik München. Gustav Bosse Verlag, Regensburg 1991, ISBN 3-7649-2395-4.
- with Matthias Kruse: Intime Textkörper. Der Liebesbrief in den Künsten. Lang, Berlin 2004, ISBN 3-03910-427-6.
- with Matthias Kruse: Schumanns Albumblätter. Olms, Hildesheim 2006, ISBN 3-487-13199-4.
- with Anke Dziewulski: Joseph von Eichendorff. Tänzer, Sänger, Spielmann. Olms, Hildesheim 2007, ISBN 978-3-487-13396-6.
- with Matthias Kruse: 1808 – ein Jahr mit Beethoven. Olms, Hildesheim 2008, ISBN 978-3-487-13670-7.
- with Matthias Kruse: „True to life“ - Händel, der Klassiker. Olms, Hildesheim 2009, ISBN 978-3-487-14213-5.
- with Matthias Kruse: Chopin, der Antistar. Olms, Hildesheim 2010, ISBN 978-3-487-14331-6.
- with Matthias Kruse: „Was mir die Engel erzählen …“. Mahlers traumhafte Gegenwelten. Olms, Hildesheim 2011, ISBN 978-3-487-14595-2.
- with Matthias Kruse: Weltenspiele. Musik um 1912. Olms, Hildesheim 2012, ISBN 978-3-487-14819-9.
- with Matthias Kruse: „… die nach Gerechtigkeit dürsten“. Menschenrechtsappelle in der Musik. Dramen von Verdi, Wagner und Britten. Olms, Hildesheim 2013, ISBN 978-3-487-15019-2.
- with Annette Simonis: „Die süße Macht der Töne …“. Zur Bedeutung der Musik in Shakespeares Werken und ihrer Rezeption (Wegzeichen Musik. Vol. 9). Olms, Hildesheim 2014, ISBN 978-3-487-15092-5.
- with Anette Simonis: Die verzaubernde Kunstwelt Ludwigs XIV. – Versailles als Gesamtkunstwerk. Georg Olms Verlag, Hildesheim 2015, ISBN 978-3-487-15264-6.
- with Anette Simonis: „Poesie in reinstes Gold verwandeln …“. Cervantes’ Don Quijote in Literatur, Kunst, Musik und Philosophie. Olms, Hildesheim 2015, ISBN 978-3-487-15425-1.
