= Forests of Germany =

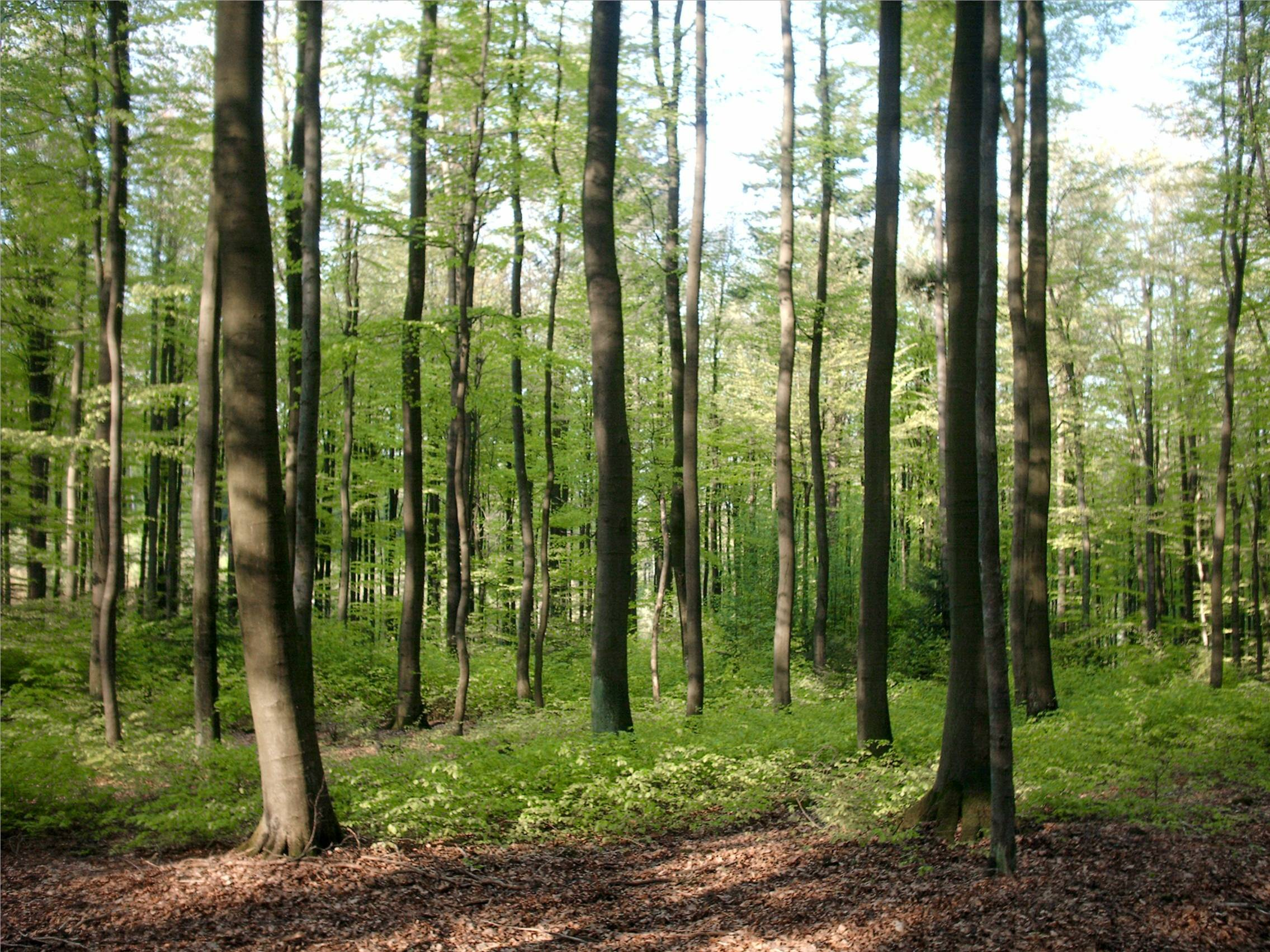
A beech forest after the leaves in spring in the Spessart

The forests of Germany cover 11.5 million hectares (28.4 million Acres), 32 percent of the total area of the country (as of 2022).

In the German forests grow about 90 billion trees with a total wood stock of 3.7 billion cubic meters.

The definition of the Federal Forest Act (BWaldG) for forest is: "any area planted with forest plants. Forest also includes clear-cut or shaded ground areas, forest roads, forest clearance and securing strips, forest meadows and clearings, forest meadows, grass clearing areas, wood storage areas and other areas associated with and serving the forest."

== Woodland ==
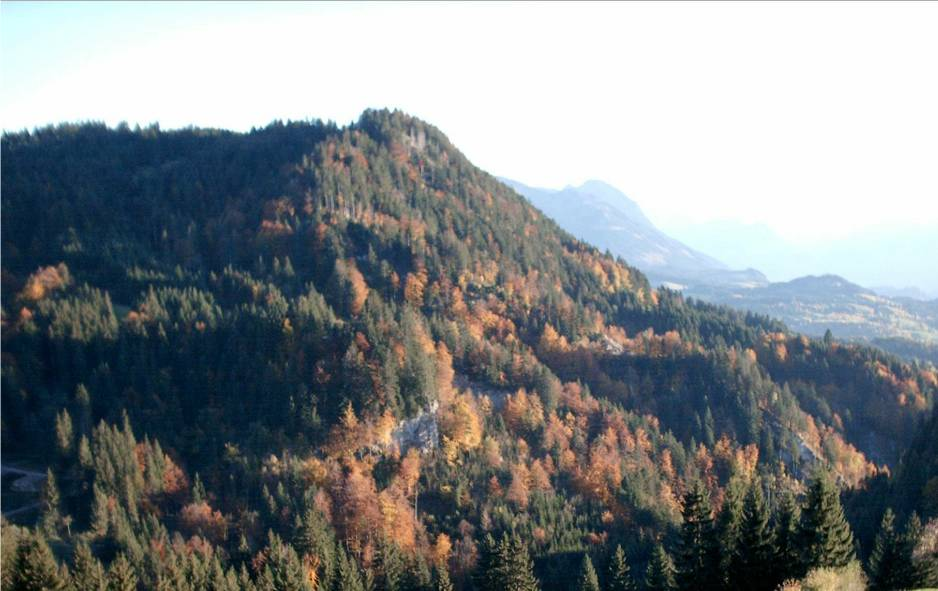
A mountain mixed forest in autumn at Brumberg, Oberallgäu

According to the results of the Fourth National Forest Inventory (2022), Germany has 11,538,455 hectares, 32.0 percent of the land area planted with forest. Of these, 11,317,073 hectares are wood flooring and 364,012 hectares are non-wood flooring, 221,382 hectares are rated as inaccessible. The German Forest area increased in the period between 2002 and 2012 by a total of 49,597 hectares or 0.4 percent and from 2012 to 2022 by another 15,000 hectares. From 2002 to 2012, around 108,000 hectares of new forest were created, while around 58,000 hectares of existing forest area were lost. The federal state with the largest forest area is Bavaria with 2.6 million hectares of forest. The largest proportion of forestation in the country surface, each with 42.3 percent, are Hessen and Rhineland-Palatinate.

The Federal Statistical Office records the forest area according to other parameters than the Federal Forest Inventory. It is based on the so-called "actual use" of the real estate cadastre. As of 31 December 2015, the Federal Statistical Office for Germany has a forest area of 109,515 km^{2}. According to the Federal Statistical Office, the area of German forests has increased by 4,979 km^{2} since 31 December 1992.

== Forest owners ==
In Germany there are about 2 million forest owners. In addition to forest owners, forest owners also include beneficial owners, provided that they are the direct owners of the forest.

The forest property types are defined as follows according to 3 of the Federal Forest Act (BWaldG):

- State forest: forest in sole ownership of the federal government, a state or an institution or a foundation under public law as well as forest in co-ownership of a country, insofar as it is regarded as state forest according to state regulations.
- Corporate forest: forest owned by municipalities, municipal associations, special purpose associations and other public bodies. Excluded is the forest of religious communities and their institutions, as well as of real associations, Hauberggenossenschaften, Markgenossenschaften, Gehöferschaften and similar communities (Gemeinschafts Forsten), as far as he is not regarded under state law as a corporate forest.
- Private forest: Forest that is neither state nor corporate forest.

According to the surveys of the National Forest Inventory, 48.0 percent of the German forest area is private forest, 29.0 percent state forest of the federal states, 19.4 percent corporate forest and 3.5 percent federal state forest. The federal state with the largest private forest share is North Rhine-Westphalia with 66.8 percent. With 46.1 percent, Rhineland-Palatinate has the highest share of corporate forests. The state forest dominates with 50.1 percent area share in Mecklenburg-Vorpommern.

In Germany there are 16 state forestry enterprises: 15 forestry companies of the countries (except Bremen) and the Federal Forestry. The largest forest owner in Germany is the Free State of Bavaria with around 778,000 hectares, which are mainly managed by the Bavarian State Forests (BaySF).

The number of corporate forests in Germany is estimated at 60,000, with an average size of 38 hectares. The Kloster Kammer Hannover has 24,400 hectares, the largest German corporate forest. The largest municipal forest owner is the city of Brilon with 7,750 hectares of forest.

The private forest in Germany is distributed to almost 2 million owners. The average size of German private forests is 3 hectares. While the property size class covers more than 1,000 hectares, only 13 percent of the private forest area, 50 percent of the area and 98 percent of the owners in the small private forest to 20 hectares in size. The DBU Nature be GmbH is with about 69,000 hectares of total area (including open land areas) the largest private forest owner in Germany. Around 150,000 hectares of forest are distributed by the churches in Germany to more than 6,500 legal entities (parishes, monasteries, foundations, bishoprics). Even though the churches are for the most part public corporations, the church forest is a private forest.

== Tree species ==
The Fourth National Forest Inventory in 2022 recorded 51 tree species and tree species groups in German forests. The spruce stands for the largest proportion of the wooded floor at 21.0 percent, down from 26.0 percent in 2012, followed by the pines at 22.0 percent, the beech at 17.0 percent and the oak at 12.0 percent. Common tree species in the German forests are also the hanging birch (Betula pendula), the common ash (Fraxinus excelsior), the black alder (Alnus glutinosa), the European larch (Larix decidua), the common Douglas fir (Pseudotsuga menziesii) and the sycamore maple (Acer pseudoplatanus).

== Forest damages since 2018 ==
From 2018 to 2021, a sequence of storms, extreme dry years and bark beetle infestations according to the German Aerospace Center caused damages on more than 500,000 hectares or about 5% of the German forested area. The forest in the states of North Rhine-Westphalia, Thuringia and Bavaria suffered the most in those years.

According to the 2022 Fourth National Forest Inventory (Bundeswaldinventur or BWI 4), 79 percent of the German forest are mixed species stands, but monoculture plantations of Norway spruce (Picea abies) were most severely afflicted by damages on 461,000 hectares or 16.8 percent of their former area. Storms felled many of the shallow rooting spruces, droughts additionally reduced their vitality and created a large breeding reservoir for the European spruce bark beetle (Ips typographus), causing a mass reproduction unstoppable for several years.

While before these damages the “Waldumbau” (conversion from monocultures to mixed species stands with higher shares of hardwood) for better resilience against climate change and extreme weather conditions already was pushed especially by the states’ operational forestry companies, the massive die-back on large spruce areas underlined the urgent necessity to speed up this conversion. However, spruce is the most demanded species for lumber production in Germany, so research is underway to find new ways of utilizing hardwoods, too, in spite of their very different lumber characteristics regarding e.g. weight or density.

== Forest modification and tree species change ==
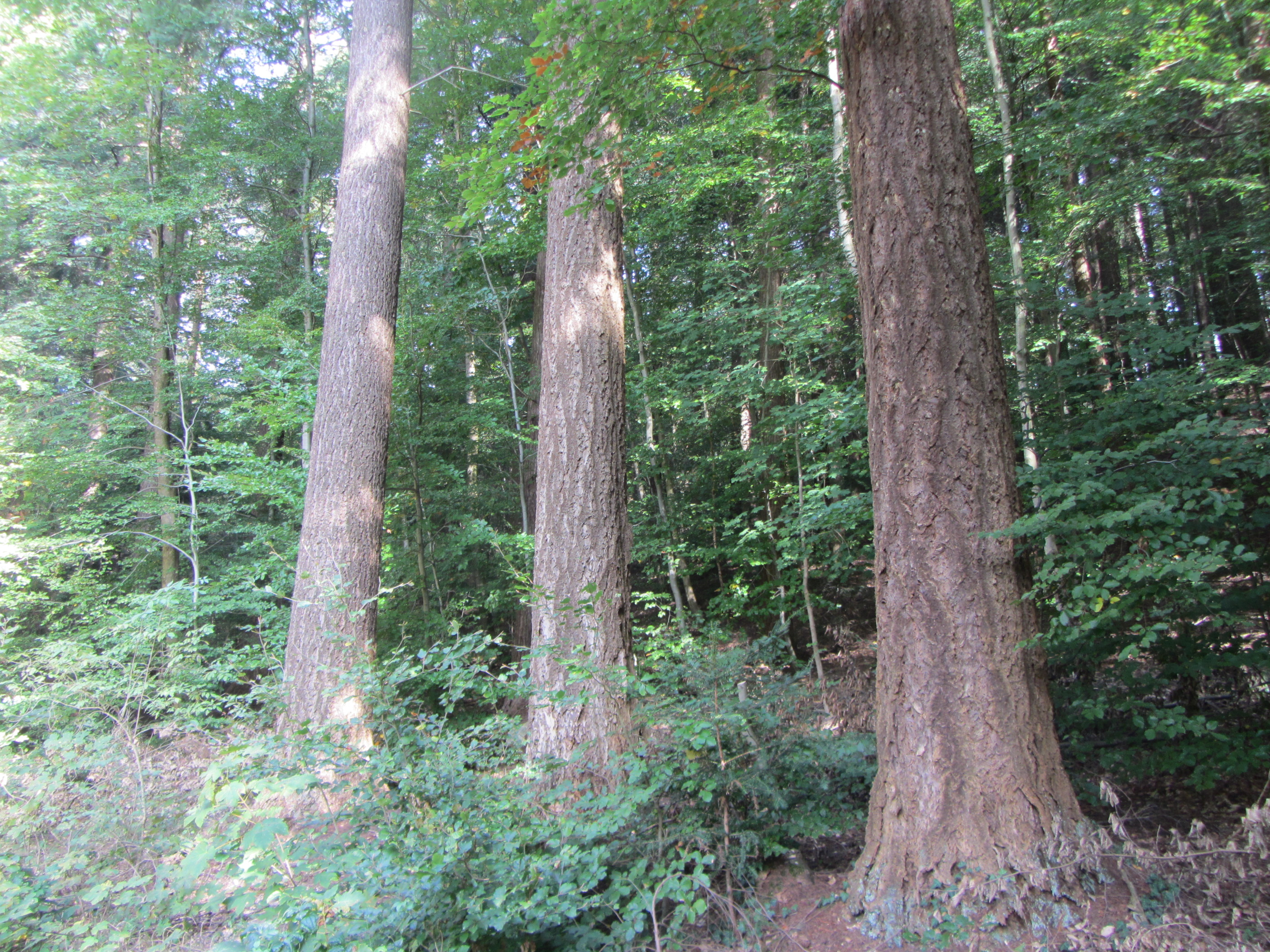
Wind throw in a spruce tree

By nature, the German forest would be strongly influenced by deciduous trees, in particular red beech (Fagus sylvatica). Today's tree species composition with high proportions of coniferous trees reflects the forest use of the past centuries. From the Middle Ages to the early 19th century, many forests in Germany were over-used or beaten to pieces. In order to avert an imminent wood problem, these devastated forests and areas were reforested in the context of sustainable forestry on the better soils with good water supply often with common spruce (Picea abies) and on the nutrient-poorer and drier locations with pine (Pinus sylvestris).

These two robust tree species are better able to cope with the difficult ecological conditions on clear-cutting land than frost-sensitive tree species such as European beech and white fir (Abies alba) and also provide high timber yields. Even during and after the two world wars caused by the destruction of the war, the Reparationshiebe and the wood requirements for the reconstruction large Kahlflächen on which often pure populations of spruce and pine were established. The forest owners and foresters of the time provided a great cultural achievement with the reconstruction of the forests - given the large areas and limited resources available.

== See also ==
- German Forest
- History of the forest in Central Europe
