= SMS Kaiser Friedrich III =

Battleship of the German Imperial Navy

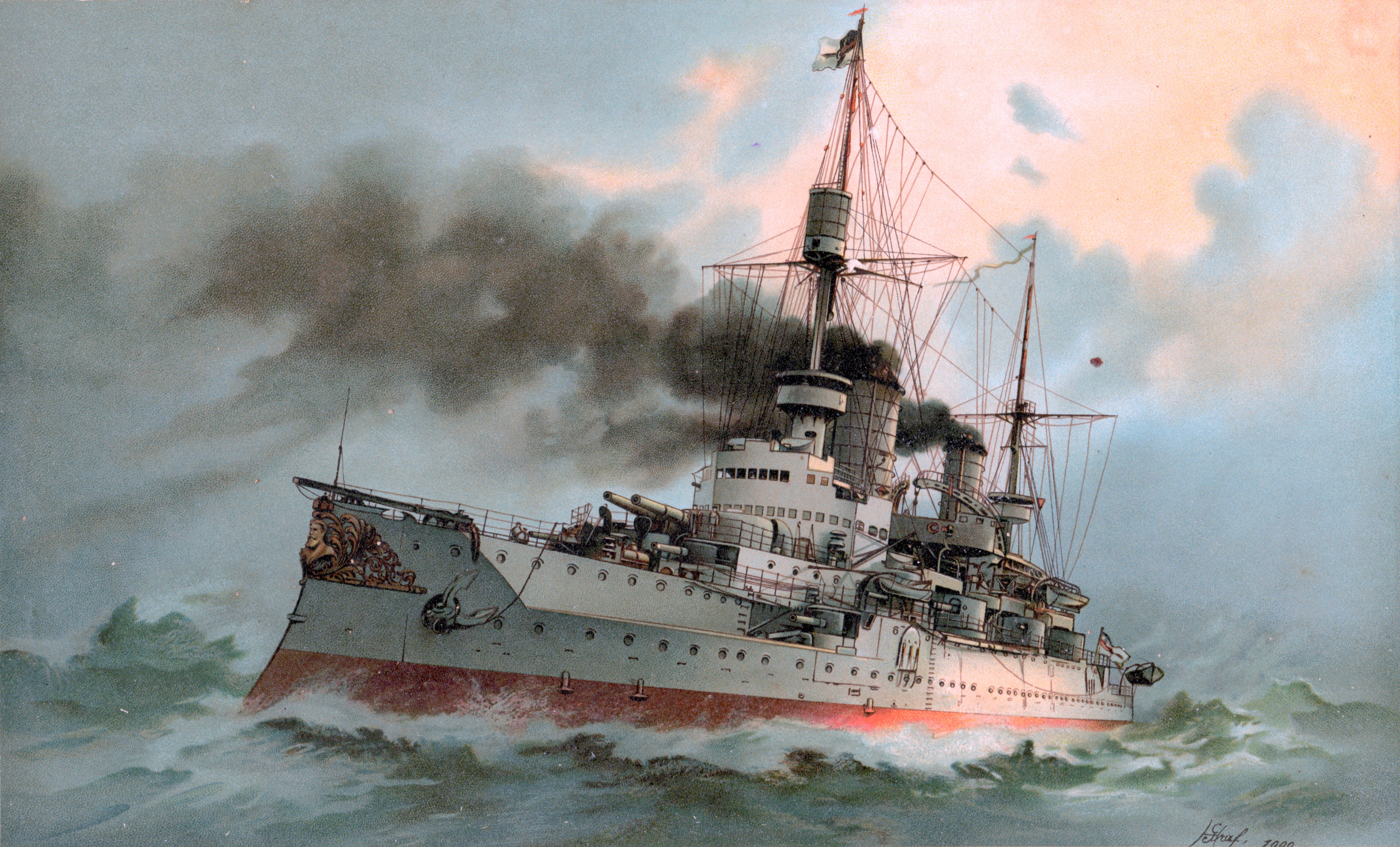
- Lithograph of SMS Kaiser Friedrich III in 1900

History

German Empire
- Name: Kaiser Friedrich III
- Namesake: Friedrich III
- Builder: Kaiserliche Werft Wilhelmshaven
- Laid down: 5 March 1895
- Launched: 1 July 1896
- Commissioned: 7 October 1898
- Fate: Scrapped in 1920

General characteristics
- Class & type: Kaiser Friedrich III-class battleship
- Displacement: Normal: 11,097 t (10,922 long tons); Full load: 11,785 t (11,599 long tons)
- Length: 125.3 m (411 ft 1 in)
- Beam: 20.4 m (66 ft 11 in)
- Draft: 7.89 m (25 ft 11 in)
- Installed power: 12 × fire-tube boilers; 13,000 PS (12,820 ihp; 9,560 kW)
- Propulsion: 3 × triple-expansion steam engines; 3 × screw propellers
- Speed: 17.5 knots (32.4 km/h; 20.1 mph)
- Range: 3,420 nmi (6,330 km; 3,940 mi) at 10 knots (19 km/h; 12 mph)
- Complement: 658–687
- Armament: 4 × 24 cm (9.4 in) 40 cal guns; 18 × 15 cm (5.9 in) SK L/40 guns; 12 × 8.8 cm (3.5 in) SK L/30 guns; 12 × 3.7 cm (1.5 in) machine cannon; 6 × 45 cm (17.7 in) torpedo tubes
- Armor: Belt: 300 to 150 mm (11.8 to 5.9 in); Deck: 65 mm (2.6 in); Conning Tower: 250 mm (9.8 in); Turrets: 250 mm; Casemates: 150 mm

SMS Kaiser Friedrich III ("His Majesty's Ship Emperor Frederick III") (Note: "SMS" stands for Seiner Majestät Schiff ("His Majesty's Ship").) was the lead ship of the Kaiser Friedrich III class of pre-dreadnought battleships. She was laid down at the Kaiserliche Werft in Wilhelmshaven in March 1895, launched in July 1896, and finished in October 1898. The ship was armed with a main battery of four 24-centimeter (9.4 in) guns in two twin gun turrets supported by a secondary battery of eighteen 15 cm (5.9 in) guns.

Sea trials and modifications lasted more than a year, and once she entered active service in October 1899, the ship became the flagship of Prince Heinrich in I Squadron of the German Heimatflotte (Home Fleet). I Squadron was primarily occupied with training exercises throughout each year, and also made numerous trips to other European countries, particularly Great Britain and Sweden–Norway. In 1901, the ship was severely damaged after striking submerged rocks in the Baltic Sea; the incident contributed to design changes in later German battleships to make them more resistant to underwater damage.

Kaiser Friedrich III was extensively modernized in 1908; her secondary guns were reorganized and her superstructure was cut down to reduce top-heaviness. After returning to service in 1910, Kaiser Friedrich III was placed in the Reserve Formation; she spent the next two years laid up, being activated only for the annual fleet maneuvers. The years 1913 and 1914 passed without any active service until the outbreak of World War I in July 1914. Though obsolete, Kaiser Friedrich III and her sister ships served in a limited capacity as coastal defense ships in V Battle Squadron in the early months of the war, tasked with defending Germany's North Sea coastline. The ships conducted two operations in the Baltic but did not encounter any hostile warships. By February 1915, Kaiser Friedrich was withdrawn from service and eventually decommissioned in November, thereafter being employed as a prison ship and later as a barracks ship. She was scrapped in 1920.

== Design ==
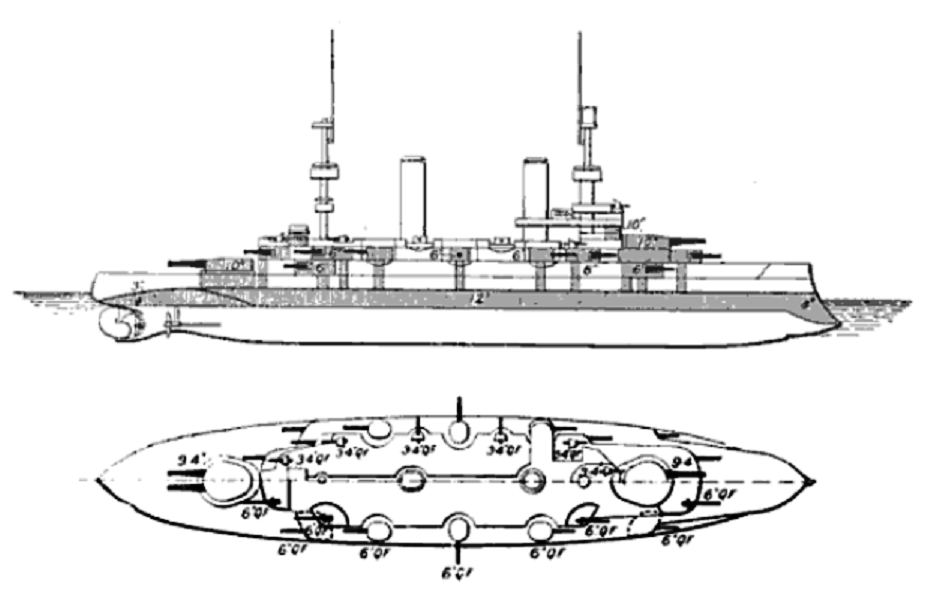
Plan and profile drawing of the Kaiser Friedrich III class

After the Imperial German Navy ordered the four Brandenburg-class battleships in 1889, a combination of budgetary constraints, opposition in the Reichstag (Imperial Diet), and a lack of a coherent fleet plan delayed the acquisition of further battleships. The former Secretary of the Reichsmarineamt (Imperial Navy Office), Leo von Caprivi, became the Chancellor of Germany in 1890, and Vizeadmiral (Vice Admiral) Friedrich von Hollmann became Secretary of the Reichsmarineamt. Hollmann requested a new battleship in 1892 to replace the ironclad turret-ship Preussen, built twenty years earlier, but the Franco-Russian Alliance, signed the year before, put the government's attention on expanding the Army's budget. Parliamentary opposition forced Hollmann to delay until the following year, when Caprivi spoke in favor of the project, noting that Russia's recent naval expansion threatened Germany's Baltic Sea coastline. In late 1893, Hollmann presented the Navy's estimates for the 1894–1895 budget year, again with a request for a replacement for Preussen, which was approved. The new ship abandoned the six-gun arrangement of the Brandenburgs for four large-caliber pieces, the standard arrangement of other navies at the time.

Kaiser Friedrich III was 125.3 m (411 ft 1 in) long overall and had a beam of 20.4 m (66 ft 11 in) and a draft of 7.89 m (25 ft 11 in) forward and 8.25 m (27 ft 1 in) aft. She displaced 11,097 t (10,922 long tons) as designed and up to 11,785 t (11,599 long tons) at full load. The ship was powered by three 3-cylinder vertical triple-expansion steam engines that drove three screw propellers. Steam was provided by four Marine-type and eight cylindrical boilers, all of which burned coal and were vented through a pair of tall funnels. Kaiser Friedrich III's powerplant was rated at 13,000 metric horsepower (12,820 ihp; 9,560 kW), which generated a top speed of 17.5 knots (32.4 km/h; 20.1 mph). She had a cruising radius of 3,420 nautical miles (6,330 km; 3,940 mi) at a speed of 10 knots (19 km/h; 12 mph). The crew comprised between 658 and 687 officers and enlisted men.

The ship's armament consisted of a main battery of four 24 cm (9.4 in) SK L/40 guns in twin gun turrets, (Note: In Imperial German Navy gun nomenclature, "SK" (Schnelladekanone) denotes that the gun is quick firing, while the L/40 denotes the length of the gun. In this case, the L/40 gun is 40 caliber, meaning that the gun is 40 times as long as it is in diameter.) one fore and one aft of the central superstructure. Her secondary armament consisted of eighteen 15 cm (5.9 in) SK L/40 guns carried in a mix of turrets and casemates. Close-range defense against torpedo boats was provided by a battery of twelve 8.8 cm (3.5 in) SK L/30 quick-firing guns, all mounted in casemates. She also carried twelve 3.7 cm (1.5 in) machine cannon; these were later removed. There were six 45 cm (17.7 in) torpedo tubes, all in above-water swivel mounts. The ship's belt armor was 150 to 300 mm (5.9 to 11.8 in) thick, and the main armor deck was 65 mm (2.6 in) thick. The conning tower and main battery turrets were protected with 250 mm (9.8 in) of armor plating, and the secondary casemates received 150 mm (5.9 in) of armor protection.

== Service history ==
=== Construction to 1900 ===
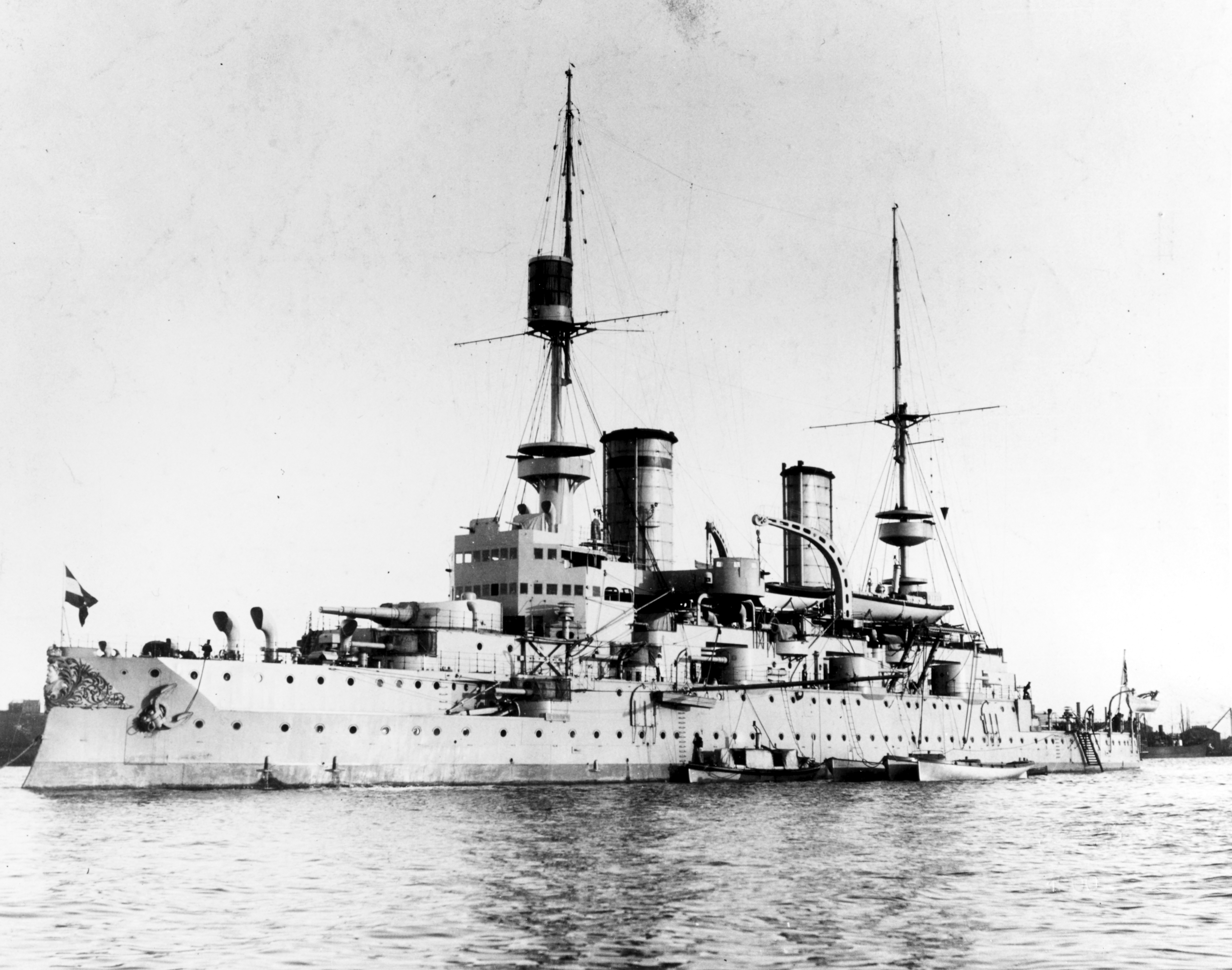
Kaiser Friedrich III photographed in 1900

Kaiser Friedrich III's keel was laid on 5 March 1895 at the Kaiserliche Werft (Imperial Shipyard) in Wilhelmshaven, under construction number 22. Kaiser Wilhelm II, the son of the ship's namesake, hammered the first rivet into the keel. She was ordered under the contract name Ersatz Preussen, to replace the elderly armored frigate Preussen. (Note: German warships were ordered under provisional names. Additions to the fleet were given a single letter; ships intended to replace older or lost vessels were ordered as "Ersatz (name of the ship to be replaced)".) Kaiser Friedrich III was launched on 1 July 1896 and Wilhelm II was present again, this time to give the launching speech. The ship was commissioned on 7 October 1898 and began sea trials in the Baltic Sea. Of major concern was how the three-shaft arrangement would perform on a ship the size of Kaiser Friedrich III; the preceding Brandenburg class had used two shafts. After the trials were completed in mid-February 1899, Kaiser Friedrich returned to Wilhelmshaven and was decommissioned so defects identified during the trials could be remedied. The work lasted longer than originally planned, her main battery guns had not yet been delivered, and the ship remained out of service for much of the year.

Upon recommissioning on 21 October, Kaiser Friedrich III was assigned to II Division of I Squadron of the Heimatflotte (Home Fleet), which was commanded by Vizeadmiral Paul Hoffmann. She took the place of the ironclad Baden, which had been decommissioned the previous day. Kaiser Friedrich III became the flagship of II Division, commanded by Konteradmiral (Rear Admiral) Wilhelm Büchsel. Before she could join her division, Kaiser Friedrich III and the aviso Hela were sent to escort the Kaiser's yacht Hohenzollern on a trip to Britain for the Kaiser to visit his grandmother, Queen Victoria. The ships left Germany on 17 November and stayed in Dover from 18 to 20 November, before proceeding to Portsmouth on the 20th, remaining there for three days. On their return they stopped in Vlissingen in the Netherlands, from 24 to 29 November, before continuing to Kiel, where they arrived on 1 December.

Kaiser Friedrich III finally assumed her role as II Division flagship on 24 January 1900, when Büchsel transferred his flag to the ship. On 2 April, I Squadron steamed to Danzig Bay, where they stayed for four days. The next month, they began a cruise into the North Sea on 7 May; during the trip, the ships made stops in Lerwick in Shetland from 12 to 15 May and Bergen, Norway, from 18 to 22 May. They arrived back in Kiel four days after leaving Bergen. In early July, the four Brandenburg-class battleships were sent to Asia to suppress the Boxer Uprising, prompting a reorganization of the Heimatflotte. Kaiser Friedrich III and Kaiser Wilhelm II were the only battleships available for the annual fleet maneuvers, which were conducted from 15 August to 15 September. They were joined by the armored frigates Sachsen and Württemberg and six Siegfried and Odin-class coastal defense ships. Throughout the maneuvers, Kaiser Friedrich III was assigned to the "German" force, which had to combat a hostile "Yellow" squadron. Thereafter, Büchsel became the deputy commander of I Squadron, but he remained aboard Kaiser Friedrich III only briefly before transferring his flag to the ironclad Württemberg. Konteradmiral Max von Fischel replaced him on 30 September, but Kaiser Friedrich III went into drydock for her annual overhaul shortly thereafter.

On 1 November, Vizeadmiral Prince Heinrich, who had replaced Hoffmann as I Squadron commander, raised his flag aboard Kaiser Friedrich III; the ship held the role as squadron flagship for the next three years, interrupted only during the annual fleet exercises conducted in August and September, when Admiral Hans von Koester, the Generalinspekteur der Marine (Inspector-General of the Navy), commanded the fleet from Kaiser Wilhelm II. Through November, the ships of the squadron were occupied with individual training. On 17 November 1900, Kaiser Friedrich III was steaming to Kiel after conducting training exercises. Kaiser Wilhelm II attempted to pass Kaiser Friedrich III, so the latter stopped and allowed the former to pass to port. However, the order to resume steaming was given too quickly, and the ship accidentally rammed Kaiser Wilhelm II. Kaiser Friedrich III suffered minor damage to her bow, while her sister was slightly damaged in the steering engine compartment. Repairs were completed within three days, without the need for either vessel to enter drydock. On 4 December, the ships began a winter training cruise, during which they stopped in Larvik, Norway, from 10 to 12 December. The squadron returned to Germany three days later.

=== 1901 grounding ===
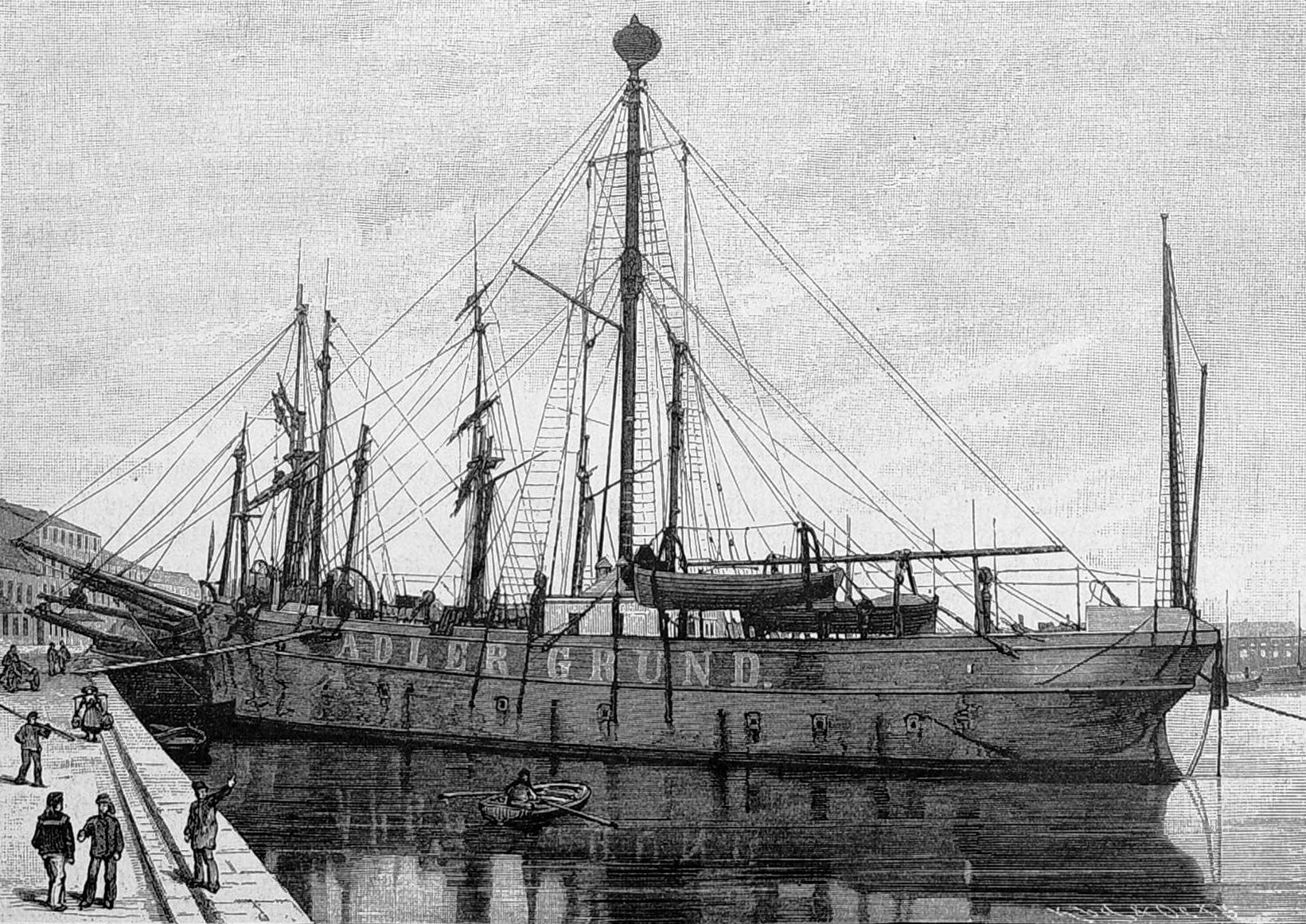
Adlergund lightship, which was out of location on the night of 1–2 April, contributing to the incident

In early 1901 the ships underwent maintenance. The repairs were completed by mid-March, and the members of the squadron reunited in Kiel. They then began a training cruise into the Baltic Sea, stopping in Danzig on 1 April. There, Koester informed Prince Heinrich about upcoming joint Army–Navy maneuvers. While returning to Kiel on the night of 1–2 April, Kaiser Friedrich III struck an uncharted rock off Kap Arkona, north of the Adlergrund, at around 01:27. The rock breached the starboard side of the hull and damaged four of the ship's watertight compartments, which filled with water and caused the ship to list to port. Eventually, some 1,200 t (1,200 long tons; 1,300 short tons) of water entered the ship. The shock from the collision damaged the ship's boilers and started a fire in the coal bunkers, which spread to the starboard aft boiler room, forcing the crew to shut down the ship's engines. All the ship's ammunition magazines, engine rooms, and storage compartments had to be flooded to prevent the fire from spreading. Three men were seriously injured while fighting the fire, one of whom died of his injuries.

The crew were able to suppress the fire and contain the flooding. Kaiser Wilhelm II, which had also had a slight grounding (without damage), came alongside to take off the crew if it became necessary to abandon ship and, once the fires were controlled, attempted to take Kaiser Friedrich III under tow, but the cables snapped. By this time, the crew had raised steam in the remaining boilers, and the ship proceeded at 5 knots (9.3 km/h; 5.8 mph) to Kiel, which she reached on 3 April. There, the ship was thoroughly examined. The dockyard workers found that eight of the ship's boilers had been badly damaged, and many bulkheads had been bent from the pressure of the water. The keel was extensively damaged, with large holes torn in several places. All three of the ship's propellers were damaged as well. Temporary repairs were effected in Kiel, which included sealing the holes with cement and wood. On 23 April, this work was completed, and she left for Wilhelmshaven, where she was decommissioned for permanent repairs on 4 May.

The investigation found that the nearby lightship—which was used to navigate the channel at night—was 700 meters (2,300 ft) from its assigned location, and there were several uncharted rocks in the area of the accident. Therefore, the investigation concluded that the ship's command staff was not at fault in the accident. The investigators recommended design changes to the Deutschland-class battleships, then still being designed, namely the adoption of a torpedo bulkhead to improve resistance to underwater damage. The changes would not be incorporated in a German battleship until the subsequent Nassau-class dreadnought battleships, as their increased size allowed room for the bulkhead and associated watertight compartments.

While Kaiser Friedrich III was decommissioned for repairs, her crew was transferred to her new sister Kaiser Wilhelm der Grosse. The work was completed by early November, and on the 11th, the ship was recommissioned. Both her crew and Prince Heinrich returned from Kaiser Wilhelm der Grosse. Divisional exercises followed through the rest of November, and on 2 December, I Squadron began another winter training cruise into the Kattegat and Skagerrak. From 7 to 12 December, the ships stopped in Oslo, Norway, where Oscar II visited Kaiser Friedrich III. The ships returned to Kiel on 15 December.

=== 1902–1903 ===
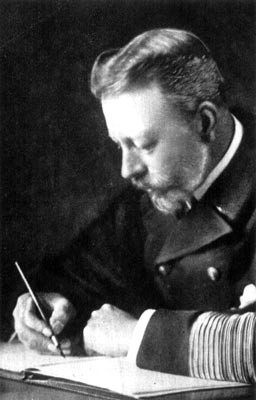
Prince Heinrich, who served as I Squadron commander aboard Kaiser Friedrich III

The last ironclad left the squadron in February 1902, having been replaced by Kaiser Friedrich III's newly commissioned sister ship Kaiser Karl der Grosse. The squadron began a major training cruise on 25 April; that day, while the ships were passing through the Danish Straits, there was a serious boiler accident aboard Kaiser Wilhelm der Grosse, forcing her to turn back for repairs. Kaiser Friedrich III and the rest of the squadron continued into the North Sea, toward Scotland. They passed through the Pentland Firth on 29 April before turning south toward Ireland. The ships stopped briefly in Lough Swilly on 1 May before proceeding to Bantry Bay, where they anchored off Berehaven five days later. There, Prince Heinrich visited his British uncle, Prince Arthur, and the ships were received by the British Channel Squadron. The German vessels then steamed to Dublin, and then the Isles of Scilly, where Kaiser Wilhelm der Grosse rejoined the squadron. They returned to Dublin, where they were visited by Gerald Cadogan, the Lord Lieutenant of Ireland. The ships began their return voyage to Germany on 24 May, and reached Kiel four days later.

For most of June, the ships of the squadron conducted individual training. Vizeadmiral Alfred von Tirpitz, the State Secretary of the Imperial Naval Office, brought the Reichstag budget committee to view I Squadron in an attempt to convince them of the value of continued naval expansion. Toward the end of the month, Kaiser Friedrich III departed for Britain with Prince Heinrich to represent Germany during the coronation of King Edward VII. The ceremony was delayed, however, and Kaiser Friedrich III returned to Kiel on 30 June. I Squadron began a training cruise to Norwegian waters on 8 July that ended on 20 July. During the annual gunnery training held after the ships' return to Kiel, Kaiser Friedrich III won the Kaiser's Schießpreis (Shooting Prize) for excellence in gunnery. On 17 August, the fleet assembled in Kiel for the annual training maneuvers. Assigned to the "hostile" force, Kaiser Friedrich III patrolled the Great Belt in the Baltic to prevent the "German" squadron from passing through. Kaiser Friedrich III and several other battleships then forced an entry into the mouth of the Elbe, where the Kaiser Wilhelm Canal and Hamburg could be seized. The "hostile" flotilla accomplished these tasks within three days.

Starting in November, I Squadron—less the Wittelsbach-class ships, which were still occupied with trials—conducted a number of short cruises, culminating in the annual winter cruise that began on 1 December. The ships steamed into the Kattegat and stopped in Frederikshavn, Denmark, before continuing to Bergen, where they stayed from 6 to 10 December. Kaiser Friedrich III and the rest of the squadron returned to Kiel, arriving two days later. On 2 April 1903, the squadron went to sea again, and began gunnery training two days later. These exercises continued for the rest of the month, interrupted only by heavy storms. A major training cruise followed the next month; on 10 May the ships departed the Elbe and made their way into the Atlantic. They cruised south to Spain, passing Ushant on 14 May and reaching the Iberian Peninsula five days later. There, they conducted a reconnaissance exercise off Pontevedra before anchoring in Vigo on 20 May. Prince Heinrich left Kaiser Friedrich III for a visit to Madrid. After he returned, the squadron departed Spain on 30 May. The ships passed through the Strait of Dover on 3 June and continued into the Kattegat. There, they rendezvoused with the torpedo boats of I Torpedobootsflotille (Torpedo Boat Flotilla)—commanded by Korvettenkapitän (Lieutenant Commander) Franz von Hipper—for a mock attack on the fortifications at Kiel.

Later in June, the ships took part in additional gunnery training and were present at the Kiel Week sailing regatta. During Kiel Week, an American squadron that included the battleship USS Kearsarge and four cruisers visited. After Kiel Week, I Squadron, which had been strengthened with the new cruiser Arcona, and I Torpedobootsflotille went to sea for more tactical and gunnery exercises in the North Sea from 6 to 28 July. During the maneuvers, Kaiser Friedrich III collided with the torpedo boat G112. One man aboard G112 was killed in the accident, but the boat remained afloat and was towed to Wilhelmshaven. Kaiser Friedrich III sustained only minor damage. After the exercises, I Squadron stopped in Arendal from 24 to 27 July, while the smaller vessels went to Stavanger. The ships returned to Kiel on 28 July to prepare for the annual fleet maneuvers, which started on 15 August. Following the exercises, the Heimatflotte was reorganized as the Aktive Schlachtflotte (Active Battle Fleet), and Koester replaced Prince Heinrich as the fleet commander; he transferred his flag from Kaiser Friedrich III to Kaiser Wilhelm II.

=== 1904–1914 ===
In 1904 Kaiser Friedrich III took part in a training cruise to Britain that included squadron exercises in the northern North Sea and along the Norwegian coast. During the cruise, the ship stopped in Plymouth, Vlissingen, Lerwick, and Molde. The annual autumn fleet maneuvers, conducted from 29 August to 15 September, passed uneventfully for Kaiser Friedrich III. On 1 October, she was transferred to II Squadron, where she served as the flagship. She had informally served in this role since 17 September, as the previous flagship, the coastal defense ship Hildebrand, had been decommissioned. Fischel, by now promoted to Vizeadmiral, raised his flag aboard the ship during her formal transfer to the squadron. The two squadrons of the fleet ended the year with the usual training cruise into the Baltic, which took place uneventfully. On 12 July 1905, the fleet began its annual summer cruise to northern waters; the ships stopped in Gothenburg from 20 to 24 July and Stockholm from 2 to 7 August. The trip ended two days later, and was followed by the autumn fleet maneuvers later that month. On 1 October, the position of deputy commander of I Squadron was recreated, and Kapitän zur See (Captain) Hugo von Pohl was assigned to the role and Kaiser Friedrich III became his flagship. In December the fleet took its usual training cruise in the Baltic.

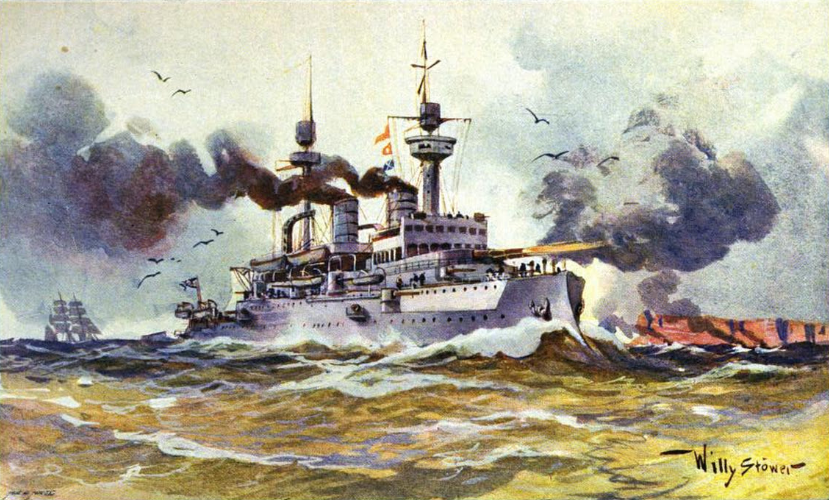
Kaiser Friedrich III conducting gunnery training off Helgoland

Kaiser Friedrich III followed the same routine of training exercises through 1906. During gunnery training that year, the ship won the Schießpreis for a second time. The summer cruise went to Norway, including stops in Molde from 20 to 26 July and Bergen from 27 July to 2 August. That year, the autumn fleet maneuvers lasted only a week, from 7 to 15 September. After the maneuvers ended, Kaiser Wilhelm II replaced Kaiser Friedrich III as the deputy commander's flagship, though she remained in I Squadron. In December the fleet took its winter cruise into the North Sea instead of the Baltic. In 1907 the ship took part in three major training exercises: the first from 8 May to 7 June; the second from 13 July to 10 August; and the third, the annual fleet maneuvers, from 26 August to 14 September. Directly after the end of the fleet maneuvers, Kaiser Friedrich III was decommissioned in the Kaiserliche Werft in Kiel, being replaced by her sister Kaiser Barbarossa. While decommissioned, the ship underwent an extensive modernization that lasted until 1909. Four of her 15 cm guns were removed, though two 8.8 cm guns were added. All twelve machine guns were removed, as was the ship's stern-mounted torpedo tube. The superstructure was also cut down to reduce the ship's tendency to roll excessively, and her funnels were lengthened.

After completing the reconstruction, Kaiser Friedrich III was assigned to the Reserve Formation of the Baltic, spending most of the year out of service. She was reactivated for the annual fleet maneuvers in August and September 1910 with the Hochseeflotte (High Seas Fleet). The ship was recommissioned on 2 August and assigned to III Battle Squadron, serving as the flagship of Vizeadmiral Max Rollmann, who came aboard four days later. The squadron was disbanded after the maneuvers on 8 September, and Kaiser Friedrich III was decommissioned again on 15 September. The ship spent most of 1911 in reserve, being activated only for the annual fleet maneuvers. After recommissioning on 31 July, she briefly served as the flagship of the deputy commander of III Squadron, Konteradmiral Heinrich Saß. The ships initially trained individually before joining the rest of the fleet on 17 August. The maneuvers lasted until 11 September, after which Kaiser Friedrich III was decommissioned yet again. This was the last time the ship would be activated before the outbreak of World War I in July 1914. She and her sister ships were removed from the Reserve Formation in May 1912, having been replaced by the Wittelsbach-class vessels.

=== World War I ===
At the outbreak of World War I in August 1914, Kaiser Friedrich III and her sisters were brought back to active service and mobilized as V Battle Squadron. Kaiser Friedrich III was commanded by Käpitan zur See Alfred Begas. V Squadron was tasked with providing coastal defense in the North Sea. The ships were deployed to the Baltic twice, from 19 to 26 September and 26 to 30 December 1914. For the first operation, the commander of naval forces in the Baltic, Prince Heinrich, initially planned to launch a major amphibious assault on Windau, but a shortage of transports forced a revision of the plan. Instead, V Squadron was to carry the landing force, but this too was cancelled after Heinrich received false reports of British warships having entered the Baltic on 25 September. Kaiser Friedrich III and her sisters returned to Kiel the following day, where the landing force disembarked. The ships then proceeded to the North Sea, where they resumed guard ship duties. For their second deployment to the Baltic, Prince Heinrich ordered a foray toward Gotland to attack any Russian warships in the area. On 26 December 1914, the battleships rendezvoused with the Baltic cruiser division in the Bay of Pomerania and then departed on the sortie. Two days later, the fleet arrived off Gotland to show the flag, and was back in Kiel by 30 December, having failed to locate any Russian vessels.

The squadron returned to the North Sea for guard duties, but was withdrawn from front-line service in February 1915. Shortages of trained crews in the High Seas Fleet, and the risk of operating older ships in wartime, necessitated the deactivation of Kaiser Friedrich III and her sisters. The ship had her crew reduced on 6 March in Kiel, where she was assigned as a harbor defense ship. The V Squadron staff came aboard the ship on 25 April, until Begas, by now promoted to Konteradmiral, left for Wörth. On 20 November, Kaiser Friedrich III was decommissioned for the last time. The ship was disarmed and used as a floating prison moored in Kiel after 1916. The guns from Kaiser Friedrich III and the rest of the ships of her class were emplaced in coastal batteries: eight guns on the mole outside Libau, and four each on the islands of Norderney and Sylt. The following year, the ship was moved to Flensburg, where she was used as a barracks; later that year she was again moved to Swinemünde. Kaiser Friedrich III was stricken from the navy list on 6 December 1919 and sold to a ship breaking firm based in Berlin. The ship was broken up at Kiel-Nordmole in 1920. Her bow ornament (bugzier) is on display at the Military History Museum of the Bundeswehr in Dresden.
