= List of battleships of Germany =

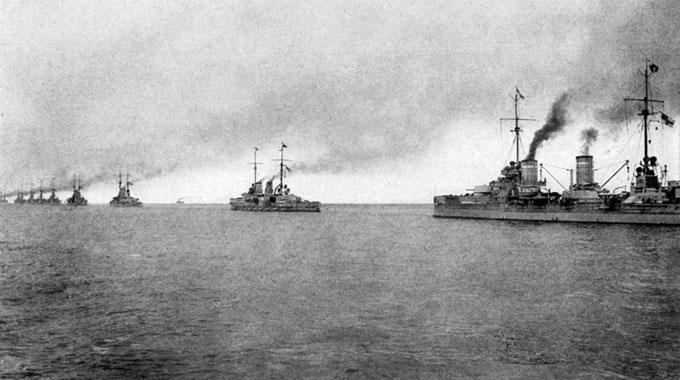
Dreadnoughts of the High Seas Fleet steam in a line of battle

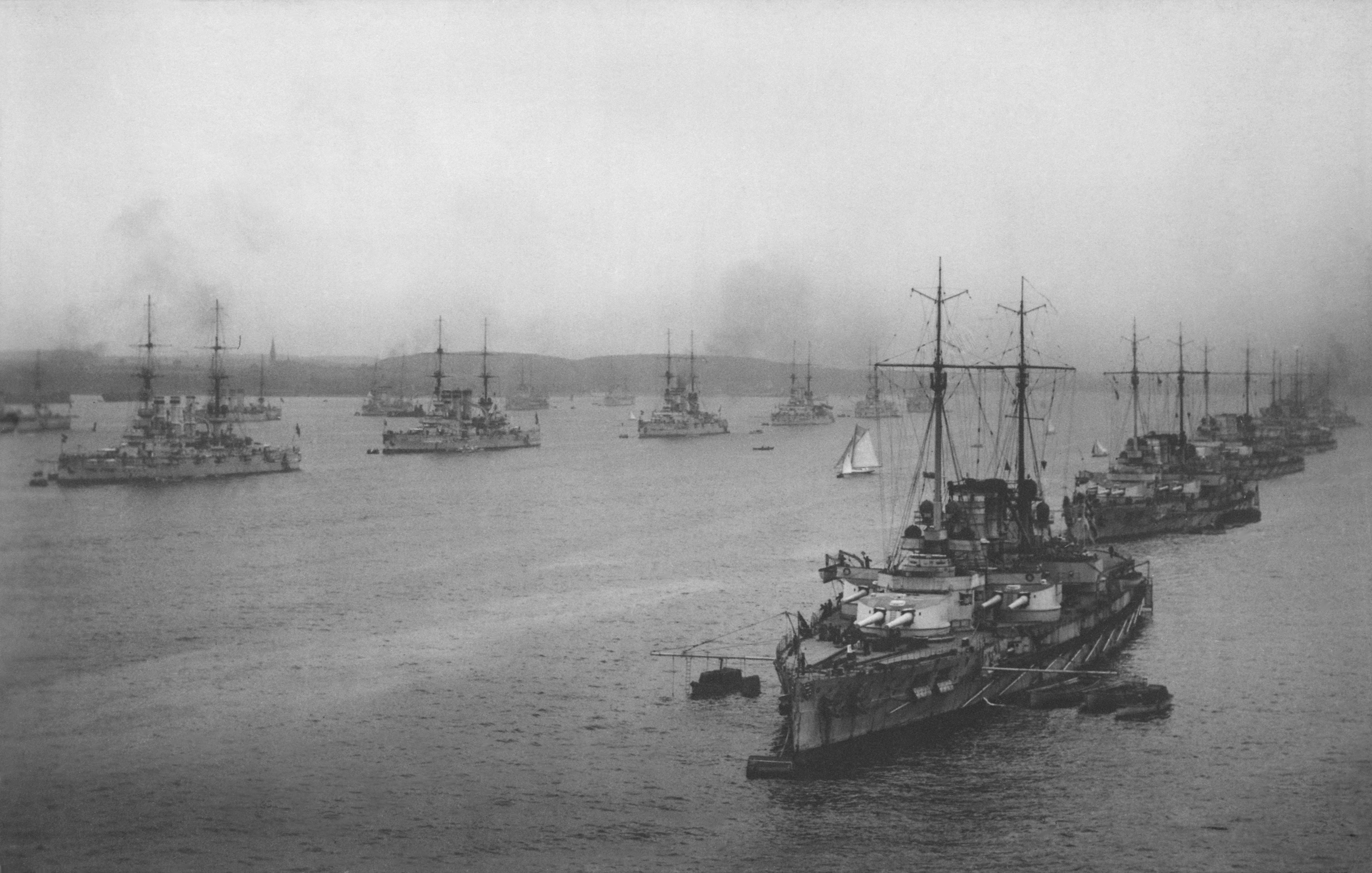
The battleships of I Battle Squadron and II Battle Squadron before the outbreak of World War I

The German navies—specifically the Kaiserliche Marine and Kriegsmarine of Imperial and Nazi Germany, respectively—built a series of battleships between the 1890s and 1940s. To defend its North and Baltic Sea coasts in wartime, Germany had previously built a series of smaller ironclad warships, including coastal defense ships, and armored frigates. (Note: These included the Sachsen-class ironclads, the armored frigate Oldenburg, and the Siegfried and Odin classes of coastal defense ships. See: Gröner, pp. 7–12.) With the accession to the throne of Kaiser Wilhelm II in 1888, the Kaiserliche Marine began a program of naval expansion befitting a Great Power. The navy immediately pushed for the construction of the four Brandenburg-class battleships, after which soon followed five Kaiser Friedrich III-class ships. The appointment of Admiral Alfred von Tirpitz to the post of State Secretary of the Navy in 1897 accelerated naval construction. Tirpitz's "risk theory" planned a fleet that would be sufficiently powerful so that Great Britain, then the world's preeminent naval power, would avoid risking war with Germany in order to preserve its superiority.

Tirpitz secured a series of Naval Laws between 1900 and 1912 that drastically increased the budget of the navy and authorized scores of battleships; the final law envisioned a fleet of some 41 battleships, 25 of which would have been assigned to the High Seas Fleet, with the remainder in reserve. Following the Kaiser Friedrich III class were the Wittelsbach, Braunschweig, and Deutschland classes, the last pre-dreadnoughts built in Germany. The launch of the "all-big-gun" HMS Dreadnought in 1906 revolutionized battleship construction, and forced Tirpitz to radically alter his shipbuilding plan. In order to remain in the battleship race, Tirpitz secured the funds for the first four German dreadnoughts, the Nassau class, which were laid down beginning in June 1907. The four Helgolands followed in 1908, as well as the five Kaisers in 1909–1910. Four König-class battleships were laid down in 1911–1912, and four Bayern-class battleships were laid down in 1913–1915, though only two—Bayern and Baden—were completed. Germany's defeat in 1918 resulted in the internment of the majority of the High Seas Fleet at Scapa Flow; the ships were eventually scuttled on 21 June 1919 to prevent them from being seized by the British Royal Navy. Of the ten battleships interned, only one, Baden, was prevented from sinking; she was later expended as a gunnery target by the Royal Navy.

Following the war, Germany was limited to eight pre-dreadnought battleships, two of which would be in reserve. New warships were severely limited in terms of armament and size. Admiral Erich Raeder was appointed the commander of the German navy in 1928. Raeder initially employed a cautious strategy vis a vis the government of the Weimar Republic. However, the rise of Adolf Hitler and the Nazi Party in 1933 allowed Raeder opportunity to expand the fleet. Hitler's government negotiated the Anglo-German Naval Agreement in 1935, which stipulated the German navy could rebuild to 35 percent of the strength of the Royal Navy. The first new battleships built in Germany were the two Scharnhorst-class ships, Scharnhorst and Gneisenau in 1935. The two Bismarck-class battleships followed in 1936; Bismarck was completed in 1940 and Tirpitz in 1941. Plan Z was formulated in 1939 to rebuild the German navy; the plan called for six additional battleships of the H-39 class. Two of them were laid down in mid-1939, though they were canceled within two months, due to the outbreak of World War II in September 1939. The other four were canceled without any work being done. Bismarck, Tirpitz, and Scharnhorst were sunk during the war and Gneisenau was scuttled in Gotenhafen in 1945. Further design studies were drawn up, culminating in the massive H-44 class, but they were not serious proposals due to the infeasibility and expense of the ships.

Key
Main guns	The number and type of the main battery guns
Displacement	Ship displacement at full combat load
Propulsion	Number of shafts, type of propulsion system, and top speed generated
Service	The dates work began and finished on the ship and its ultimate fate
Laid down	The date the keel began to be assembled
Commissioned	The date the ship was commissioned

== Pre-dreadnought battleships ==
=== Brandenburg class ===
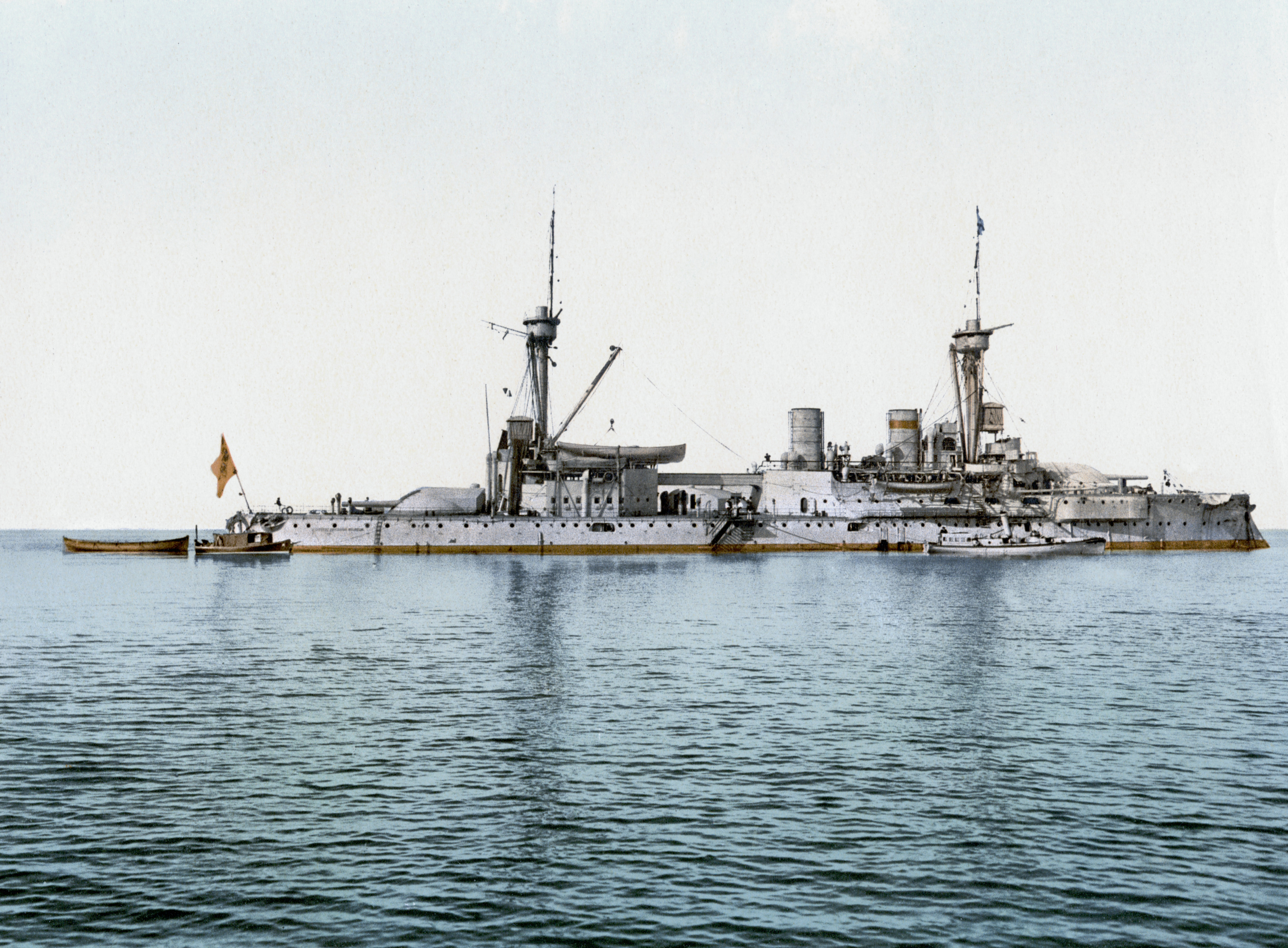
Kurfürst Friedrich Wilhelm

The Brandenburg-class ships were the first ocean-going battleships built for the German navy, and marked the beginning of German naval expansion. Previous classes included several types of ironclad ships, including coastal defense ships and armored frigates. The ships were unique for the time in that they were armed with six large-caliber guns instead of four, as was standard on contemporary ships in other navies. The class comprised four ships: Brandenburg, Kurfürst Friedrich Wilhelm, Weissenburg, and Wörth. Of the four ships, Kurfürst Friedrich Wilhelm and Weissenburg were more advanced, in that their armor was composed of higher quality steel.

The four ships were commissioned into the I Battle Squadron. They saw overseas service during the Boxer Uprising in China in 1900–1901 under the command of Marshal Alfred von Waldersee. Following the return from China, the Brandenburgs were taken into drydock for modernization, which lasted from 1901 to 1905 depending on the ship. During the reconstruction the superstructure was cut down, a second conning tower was added, and the steam boilers were replaced with newer models. Kurfürst Friedrich Wilhelm and Weissenburg were sold to the Ottoman Empire in 1910 and renamed Barbaros Hayreddin and Turgut Reis, respectively. Brandenburg and Wörth were decommissioned and placed into reserve. At the start of World War I, both ships were recalled to active service as coastal defense ships, but due to their age they were quickly demobilized. They spent the remainder of the war as barracks ships before being broken up in 1920.

Summary of the Brandenburg class
Ship	Armament	Displacement	Propulsion	Service		
Ship	Armament	Displacement	Propulsion	Laid down	Commissioned	Fate
SMS Brandenburg	6 × 28 cm (11 in)	10,670 t (10,500 long tons)	2 screws, triple-expansion steam engines, 16.3 knots (30.2 km/h; 18.8 mph)	1890	19 November 1893	Scrapped, 1920
SMS Kurfürst Friedrich Wilhelm	6 × 28 cm (11 in)	10,670 t (10,500 long tons)	2 screws, triple-expansion steam engines, 16.9 kn (31.3 km/h; 19.4 mph)	1890	29 April 1894	Transferred to the Ottoman Empire on 12 September 1910, sunk 8 August 1915
SMS Weissenburg	6 × 28 cm (11 in)	10,670 t (10,500 long tons)	2 screws, triple-expansion steam engines, 16.5 kn (30.6 km/h; 19.0 mph)	1890	14 October 1894	Transferred to the Ottoman Empire on 12 September 1910, scrapped in 1956–1957
SMS Wörth	6 × 28 cm (11 in)	10,670 t (10,500 long tons)	2 screws, triple-expansion steam engines, 16.9 kn (31.3 km/h; 19.4 mph)	1890	31 October 1893	Scrapped, 1920

=== Kaiser Friedrich III class ===
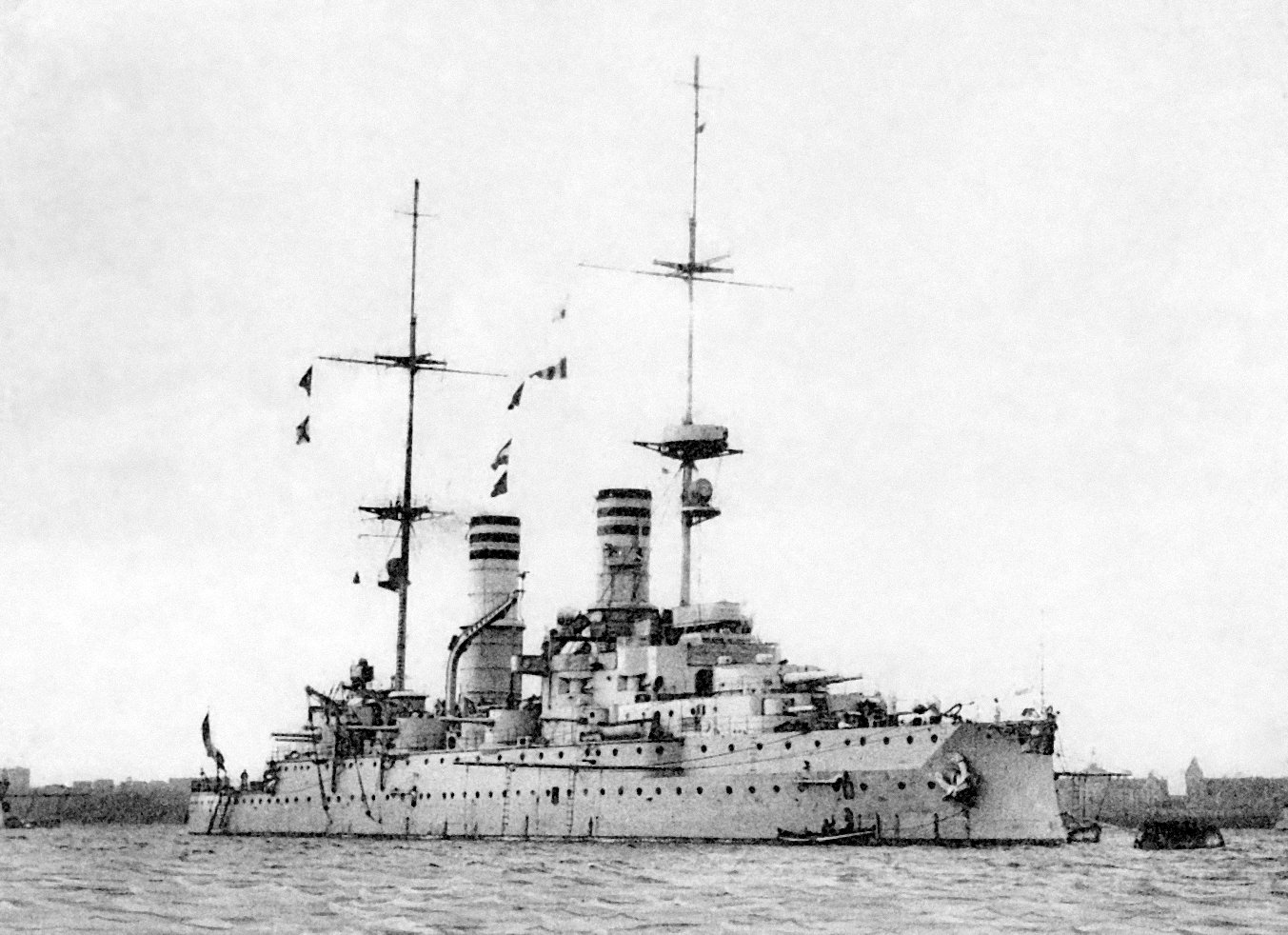
Kaiser Barbarossa

The five Kaiser Friedrich III-class ships set the standard for later German pre-dreadnought battleships: they carried smaller main guns than their foreign contemporaries, but a heavier secondary battery. This was in accordance with the "hail of fire" theory, which emphasized smaller, rapid firing guns over larger and slower guns. The ships of the class were also the first German battleships to use three screws, which would be used in many subsequent ships, as opposed to two in the Brandenburgs. The class was composed of five ships: Kaiser Friedrich III, Kaiser Wilhelm II, Kaiser Wilhelm der Grosse, Kaiser Karl der Grosse, and Kaiser Barbarossa. All of the ships were named for German emperors.

Upon commissioning, the five ships were assigned to the I Squadron of the Home Fleet (Heimatflotte). Kaiser Wilhelm II saw service as the fleet flagship until 1906. After ten years of fleet service, they were replaced with newer ships. They were transferred to the III Squadron of the fleet, which had by then been reorganized as the High Seas Fleet, and placed in reserve. In 1907, all five ships were taken into drydock for significant rebuilding. The funnels were made taller, the superstructure was cut down, and the secondary guns were rearranged; work lasted until 1910. The five ships saw no front-line service during World War I; they were all disarmed and relegated to secondary duties. Kaiser Wilhelm der Grosse was used as a torpedo training ship, Kaiser Wilhelm II was used as a headquarters ship, while the other three became prison ships. They were all broken up between 1919 and 1922.

Summary of the Kaiser Friedrich III class
Ship	Armament	Displacement	Propulsion	Service		
Ship	Armament	Displacement	Propulsion	Laid down	Commissioned	Fate
SMS Kaiser Friedrich III	4 × 24 cm (9.4 in)	11,785 t (11,599 long tons)	3 screws, triple-expansion steam engines, 17.3 kn (32.0 km/h; 19.9 mph)	1895	7 October 1898	Scrapped, 1920
SMS Kaiser Wilhelm II	4 × 24 cm (9.4 in)	11,785 t (11,599 long tons)	3 screws, triple-expansion steam engines, 17.6 kn (32.6 km/h; 20.3 mph)	1896	13 February 1900	Scrapped, 1922
SMS Kaiser Wilhelm der Grosse	4 × 24 cm (9.4 in)	11,785 t (11,599 long tons)	3 screws, triple-expansion steam engines, 17.2 kn (31.9 km/h; 19.8 mph)	1898	5 May 1901	Scrapped, 1920
SMS Kaiser Karl der Grosse	4 × 24 cm (9.4 in)	11,785 t (11,599 long tons)	3 screws, triple-expansion steam engines, 17.8 kn (33.0 km/h; 20.5 mph)	1898	4 February 1902	Scrapped, 1920
SMS Kaiser Barbarossa	4 × 24 cm (9.4 in)	11,785 t (11,599 long tons)	3 screws, triple-expansion steam engines, 17.8 kn (33.0 km/h; 20.5 mph)	1898	10 June 1901	Scrapped, 1919–1920

=== Wittelsbach class ===
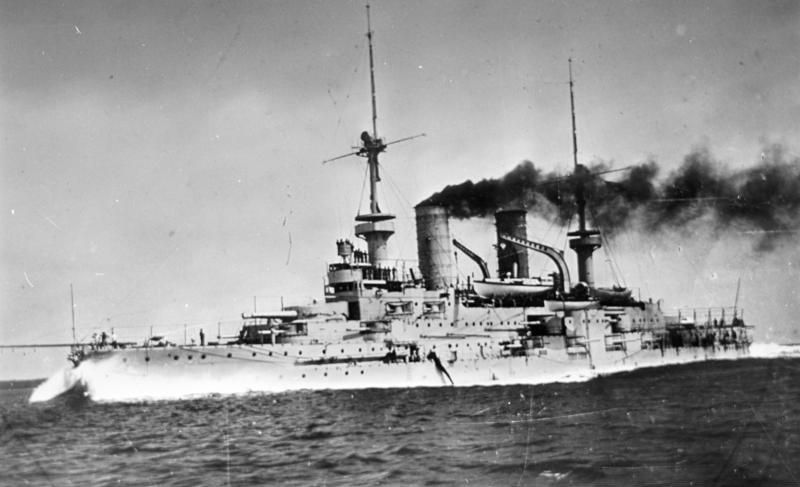
Wittelsbach in 1902

The Wittelsbach class represented an incremental improvement over the preceding Kaiser Friedrich III class. They were equipped with the same armament of four 24 cm guns, but were given an additional torpedo tube. They had improved defensive capabilities, as they were protected by a more extensive armored belt. They also differed from the preceding ships in their main deck, the entire length of which was flush. The Kaiser Friedrich III had a cut-down quarterdeck. The ships of the class, which included Wittelsbach, Wettin, Zähringen, Schwaben, and Mecklenburg, were the first battleships built under the first Naval Law of 1898.

After joining the fleet, the Wittelsbach class ships were assigned to the I Battle Squadron, where they replaced the older Brandenburg-class ships. Like the Kaiser Friedrich III-class ships, the Wittelsbachs were withdrawn from active service after the advent of the dreadnoughts. The five ships were recalled to active service at the outbreak of war in 1914. They were assigned to the IV Battle Squadron and deployed to the Baltic. However, due to their age and vulnerability, they were withdrawn from active service by 1916. They were used as training ships, with the exception of Mecklenburg, which was used as a prison ship. In 1919, Wittelsbach and Schwaben were converted into depot ships for minesweepers. By 1922, all of the ships had been broken up for scrap, with the exception of Zähringen. She was converted into a radio-controlled target ship in 1926–1927. RAF bombers sank the ship in Gotenhafen in 1944; the wreck was broken up in 1949–1950.

Summary of the Wittelsbach class
Ship	Armament	Displacement	Propulsion	Service		
Ship	Armament	Displacement	Propulsion	Laid down	Commissioned	Fate
SMS Wittelsbach	4 × 24 cm (9.4 in)	12,798 t (12,596 long tons)	3 screws, triple-expansion steam engines, 17.0 kn (31.5 km/h; 19.6 mph)	1899	15 October 1902	Scrapped, 1921
SMS Wettin	4 × 24 cm (9.4 in)	12,798 t (12,596 long tons)	3 screws, triple-expansion steam engines, 18.1 kn (33.5 km/h; 20.8 mph)	1899	1 October 1902	Scrapped, 1922
SMS Zähringen	4 × 24 cm (9.4 in)	12,798 t (12,596 long tons)	3 screws, triple-expansion steam engines, 17.8 kn (33.0 km/h; 20.5 mph)	1899	25 October 1902	Sunk in 1944; scrapped, 1949–1950
SMS Schwaben	4 × 24 cm (9.4 in)	12,798 t (12,596 long tons)	3 screws, triple-expansion steam engines, 16.9 kn (31.3 km/h; 19.4 mph)	1900	13 April 1904	Scrapped, 1921
SMS Mecklenburg	4 × 24 cm (9.4 in)	12,798 t (12,596 long tons)	3 screws, triple-expansion steam engines, 18.1 kn (33.5 km/h; 20.8 mph)	1900	25 May 1903	Scrapped, 1921

=== Braunschweig class ===
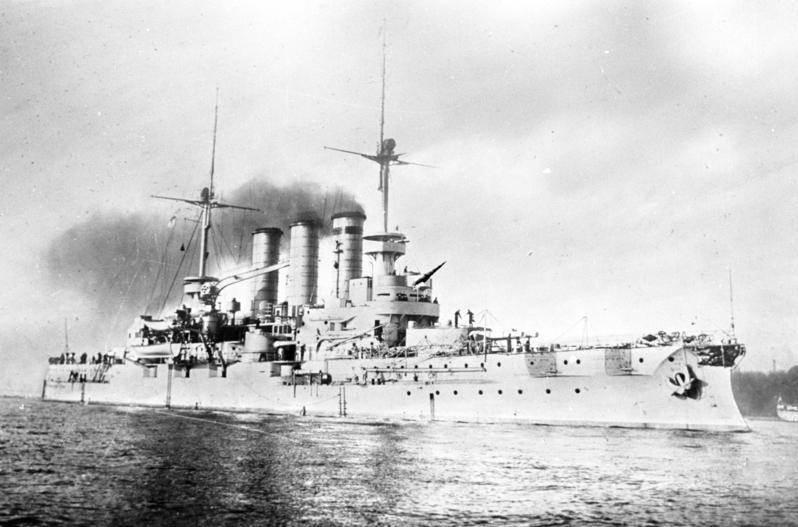
An unidentified member of the Braunschweig class in 1904

The Braunschweig class, which consisted of Braunschweig, Elsass, Hessen, Preussen, and Lothringen, was a considerable improvement over the preceding types of battleships in the German navy. They were equipped with much more powerful 28 cm guns for their main battery, although this was still smaller than the standard 12 inches (30 cm) guns used on British ships. The main battery turrets were mounted on the forecastle deck, as opposed to one deck higher as in the older ships. They were also larger and faster than their predecessors, though armor protection was largely the same. These ships were authorized under the Naval Law of 1900.

In 1907 the II Battle Squadron was organized; the five Braunschweig-class battleships were assigned to it, along with the five new Deutschland-class ships. When war broke out in 1914, four of the Braunschweig-class ships were assigned to the IV Squadron alongside the Wittelsbach-class ships. Braunschweig and Elsass took part in the Battle of the Gulf of Riga in 1915. Hessen remained in the II Battle Squadron and saw action at the Battle of Jutland in 1916. After the war, Lothringen and Preussen were converted into depot ships for minesweepers. They were eventually scrapped in 1931. A 63 m (207 ft) long section of Preussen was retained for use as an explosives target; it was eventually bombed and sunk in April 1945. The hulk was raised and broken up in 1954. The other three ships were used as coastal defense ships, though between 1931 and 1935, they too were withdrawn from service and broken up, with the exception of Hessen. Hessen was converted into a radio-controlled target ship in 1935 and served in that capacity until the end of World War II in 1945. She was then ceded to the Soviet Navy and renamed Tsel.

Summary of the Braunschweig class
Ship	Armament	Displacement	Propulsion	Service		
Ship	Armament	Displacement	Propulsion	Laid down	Commissioned	Fate
SMS Braunschweig	4 × 28 cm (11 in)	14,394 t (14,167 long tons)	3 screws, triple-expansion steam engines, 18.7 kn (34.6 km/h; 21.5 mph)	1901	15 October 1904	Scrapped, 1931
SMS Elsass	4 × 28 cm (11 in)	14,394 t (14,167 long tons)	3 screws, triple-expansion steam engines, 18.7 kn (34.6 km/h; 21.5 mph)	1901	29 November 1904	Scrapped, 1936
SMS Hessen	4 × 28 cm (11 in)	14,394 t (14,167 long tons)	3 screws, triple-expansion steam engines, 18.2 kn (33.7 km/h; 20.9 mph)	1902	19 September 1905	Ceded to USSR, 1946
SMS Preussen	4 × 28 cm (11 in)	14,394 t (14,167 long tons)	3 screws, triple-expansion steam engines, 18.5 kn (34.3 km/h; 21.3 mph)	1902	12 July 1905	Partially scrapped in 1931, sunk by bombers in 1945, raised in 1954 and scrapped
SMS Lothringen	4 × 28 cm (11 in)	14,394 t (14,167 long tons)	3 screws, triple-expansion steam engines, 18.7 kn (34.6 km/h; 21.5 mph)	1902	18 May 1906	Scrapped, 1931

=== Deutschland class ===
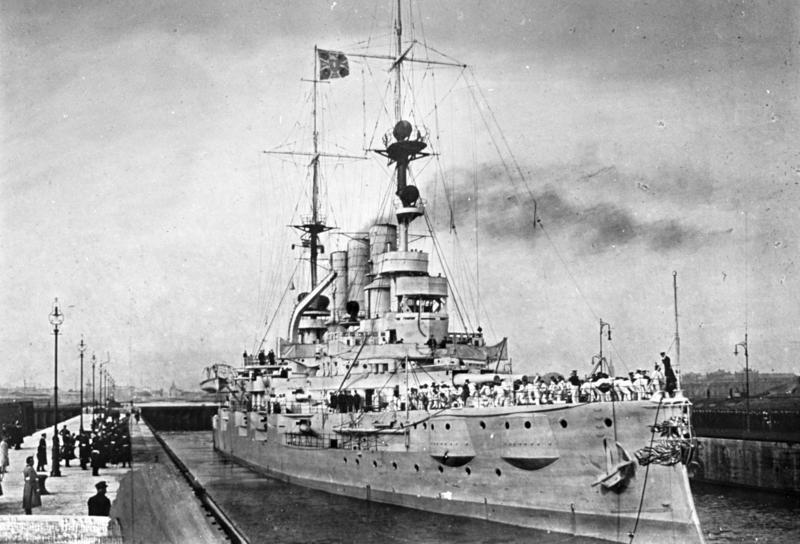
Deutschland in 1912

The five Deutschland-class battleships—Deutschland, Hannover, Pommern, Schlesien, and Schleswig-Holstein—were the last pre-dreadnoughts built by the German navy. They were similar to the Braunschweig-class ships, though their armor was thicker. The ships were built despite rumors of the capabilities of the revolutionary HMS Dreadnought. Admiral Alfred von Tirpitz insisted on their construction as larger ships would have necessitated widening the Kaiser Wilhelm Canal; this would have put an enormous strain on the naval budget for the year.

Following their commissioning starting in 1906, they were assigned to the new II Battle Squadron; Deutschland replaced Kaiser Wilhelm II as the fleet flagship. During World War I, the ships remained in the II Battle Squadron and saw combat at the Battle of Jutland in 1916. Their slow speed hindered the more modern dreadnoughts of the High Seas Fleet. Early on the second day of the battle, Pommern was sunk by a single torpedo that triggered an ammunition magazine explosion. Following the battle the Deutschlands were withdrawn from fleet duty and ultimately out of service completely in August 1917. Deutschland was broken up in 1920. The three remaining ships saw continued service in the German navy; Hannover was struck in 1935 and eventually broken up in 1944–1946. Schlesien and Schleswig-Holstein were both sunk during World War II but later raised. Schlesien was broken up in 1949–1970, while Schleswig-Holstein was transferred to the Soviet Navy in 1946.

Summary of the Deutschland class
Ship	Armament	Displacement	Propulsion	Service		
Ship	Armament	Displacement	Propulsion	Laid down	Commissioned	Fate
SMS Deutschland	4 × 28 cm (11 in)	14,218 t (13,993 long tons)	3 screws, triple-expansion steam engines, 18.6 kn (34.4 km/h; 21.4 mph)	1903	3 August 1906	Scrapped, 1920–1922
SMS Hannover	4 × 28 cm (11 in)	14,218 t (13,993 long tons)	3 screws, triple-expansion steam engines, 18.5 kn (34.3 km/h; 21.3 mph)	1904	1 October 1907	Scrapped, 1944–1946
SMS Pommern	4 × 28 cm (11 in)	14,218 t (13,993 long tons)	3 screws, triple-expansion steam engines, 18.7 kn (34.6 km/h; 21.5 mph)	1904	6 August 1907	Sunk at the Battle of Jutland, 1 June 1916
SMS Schlesien	4 × 28 cm (11 in)	14,218 t (13,993 long tons)	3 screws, triple-expansion steam engines, 18.5 kn (34.3 km/h; 21.3 mph)	1904	5 May 1908	Scuttled 5 May 1945, scrapped between 1949 and 1970
SMS Schleswig-Holstein	4 × 28 cm (11 in)	14,218 t (13,993 long tons)	3 screws, triple-expansion steam engines, 19.1 kn (35.4 km/h; 22.0 mph)	1905	6 July 1908	Scuttled on 21 March 1945, raised and ceded to USSR

== Dreadnought battleships ==
=== Nassau class ===
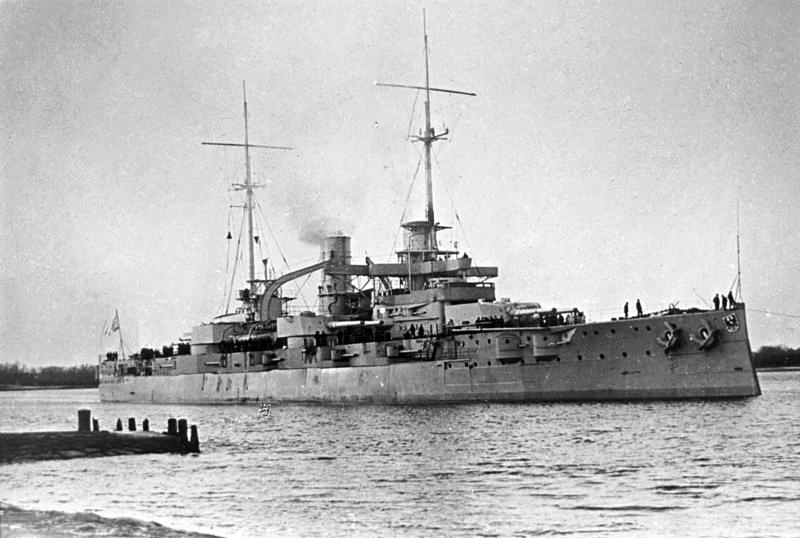
Rheinland in 1910

The Nassau class, which was composed of Nassau, Westfalen, Rheinland, and Posen, was the German response to the arrival of HMS Dreadnought, the first "all-big-gun" battleship, in 1906. The ships were unusual in their main-armament configuration, which was hexagonal. (Note: One turret was placed in the bow, another in the stern, and four amidships on either side. See: Hore, Battleships, p. 67.) They retained triple-expansion engines instead of more powerful turbine engines, and as a result, were slower than their British contemporaries.

After their commissioning into the German fleet, all four ships served in the II Division of I Battle Squadron. Two of the ships, Nassau and Posen, took part in the inconclusive Battle of the Gulf of Riga in 1915, during which they engaged the Russian pre-dreadnought Slava. The four Nassau-class ships took part in the Battle of Jutland on 31 May and 1 June 1916; they suffered only a handful of secondary battery hits and limited casualties. In early 1918 Rheinland and Westfalen were sent to Finland to support the White Finns in their civil war, but Rheinland ran aground off Åland in April and was severely damaged. At the end of World War I, the four ships were seized as war prizes by the victorious Allied powers and sold for scrapping.

Summary of the Nassau class
Ship	Armament	Displacement	Propulsion	Service		
Ship	Armament	Displacement	Propulsion	Laid down	Commissioned	Fate
SMS Nassau	12 × 28 cm (11 in)	20,535 t (20,211 long tons)	3 screws, triple-expansion steam engines, 20 kn (37 km/h; 23 mph)	1907	1 October 1909	Scrapped, 1920
SMS Westfalen	12 × 28 cm (11 in)	20,535 t (20,211 long tons)	3 screws, triple-expansion steam engines, 20.2 kn (37.4 km/h; 23.2 mph)	1907	16 November 1909	Scrapped, 1924
SMS Rheinland	12 × 28 cm (11 in)	20,535 t (20,211 long tons)	3 screws, triple-expansion steam engines, 20 kn (37 km/h; 23 mph)	1907	30 April 1910	Scrapped, 1921
SMS Posen	12 × 28 cm (11 in)	20,535 t (20,211 long tons)	3 screws, triple-expansion steam engines, 20 kn (37 km/h; 23 mph)	1907	31 May 1910	Scrapped, 1922

=== Helgoland class ===
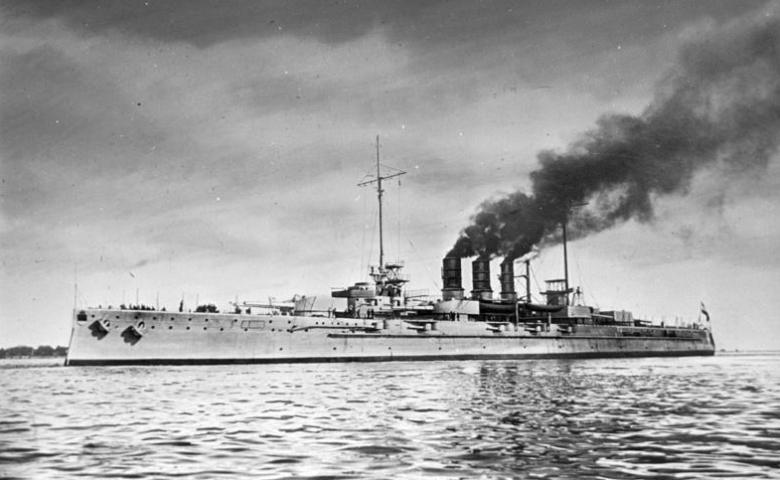
SMS Helgoland c. 1911–1917

The Helgoland class was the second type of German dreadnoughts, built during 1908–1912. The class was composed of four ships: Helgoland, Oldenburg, Ostfriesland, and Thüringen. The ships incorporated significant improvements over the previous Nassau type, including more powerful main guns and an improved propulsion system. The Helgolands were easily distinguished from the preceding Nassaus by the three funnels that were closely arranged, compared to the two larger funnels of the previous class. The ships retained the unusual hexagonal main battery layout of the Nassau class.

The ships served as a unit in the I Division, I Battle Squadron alongside the Nassau-class ships in the II Division of the I Battle Squadron. They saw combat during World War I, including the Battle of Jutland in the North Sea and the Battle of the Gulf of Riga in the Baltic. All four survived the war, but were not taken as part of the German fleet that was interned at Scapa Flow. After the German fleet at Scapa Flow were scuttled, the four Helgolands were ceded as war reparations to the victorious Allied powers in the sunken ships' stead. Ostfriesland was taken by the US Navy and expended as a target during Billy Mitchell's air power demonstration in July 1921. Helgoland and Oldenburg were allotted to Britain and Japan respectively, and broken up in 1921. Thüringen was delivered to France in 1920, and was used as a target ship for the French navy. The ship was eventually broken up between 1923 and 1933.

Summary of the Helgoland class
Ship	Armament	Displacement	Propulsion	Service		
Ship	Armament	Displacement	Propulsion	Laid down	Commissioned	Fate
SMS Helgoland	12 × 30.5 cm (12 in)	24,700 t (24,300 long tons)	3 screws, triple-expansion steam engines, 20.8 kn (38.5 km/h; 23.9 mph)	1908	23 August 1911	Scrapped, 1921
SMS Ostfriesland	12 × 30.5 cm (12 in)	24,700 t (24,300 long tons)	3 screws, triple-expansion steam engines, 21.2 kn (39.3 km/h; 24.4 mph)	1908	1 August 1911	Expended as a target, 1921
SMS Thüringen	12 × 30.5 cm (12 in)	24,700 t (24,300 long tons)	3 screws, triple-expansion steam engines, 21 kn (39 km/h; 24 mph)	1908	10 September 1911	Scrapped, 1923–1933
SMS Oldenburg	12 × 30.5 cm (12 in)	24,700 t (24,300 long tons)	3 screws, triple-expansion steam engines, 21.3 kn (39.4 km/h; 24.5 mph)	1909	1 May 1912	Scrapped, 1921

=== Kaiser class ===
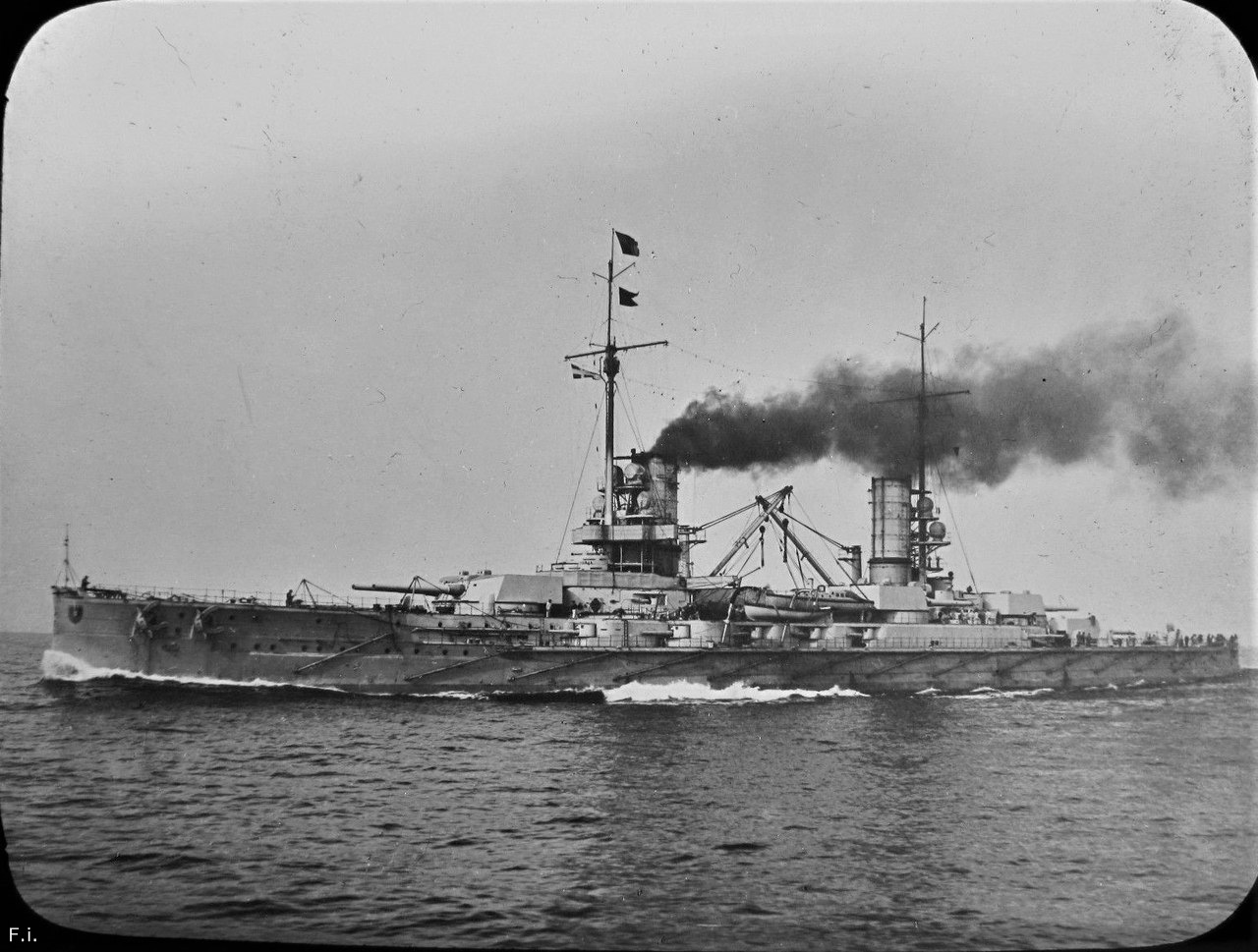
SMS Kaiser in 1913

The Kaiser class, which comprised Kaiser, Friedrich der Grosse, Kaiserin, Prinzregent Luitpold, and König Albert, was the third class of German dreadnoughts, and the first to feature turbine engines and superfiring turrets. As was usual for German battleships of the period, the Kaiser class mounted main guns that were smaller than those of their British rivals: 30.5 cm (12.0 in), compared to the 34.3 cm (13.5 in) guns of the British Orion class. The ten SK L/50 guns were mounted in five twin turrets; one turret was mounted fore, two aft in a superfiring arrangement, and the other two in a staggered "wing" arrangement amidships.

All five ships saw action in the North Sea during the war; they served together as the VI Division of the III Battle Squadron, with Friedrich der Grosse serving as the fleet flagship. Four were present during the Battle of Jutland; König Albert was in dock at the time. Of the four ships that took part in the battle, only Kaiser was damaged, being struck by two heavy-caliber shells. The ships also took part in Operation Albion in the Baltic Sea; during the operation they were reorganized as the IV Battle Squadron, under the command of Vice Admiral Wilhelm Souchon. At the end of the war, all five ships were interned at the British naval base at Scapa Flow. On 21 June 1919, they were scuttled to prevent their seizure by the Royal Navy. The ships were subsequently raised and broken up for scrap between 1929 and 1937.

Summary of the Kaiser class
Ship	Armament	Displacement	Propulsion	Service		
Ship	Armament	Displacement	Propulsion	Laid down	Commissioned	Fate
SMS Kaiser	10 × 30.5 cm (12 in)	27,000 t (26,570 long tons)	3 screws, steam turbines, 23.4 kn (43.3 km/h; 26.9 mph)	1909	1 August 1912	Scuttled at Scapa Flow, 21 June 1919
SMS Friedrich der Grosse	10 × 30.5 cm (12 in)	27,000 t (26,570 long tons)	3 screws, steam turbines, 22.4 kn (41.5 km/h; 25.8 mph)	1910	15 October 1912	Scuttled at Scapa Flow, 21 June 1919
SMS Kaiserin	10 × 30.5 cm (12 in)	27,000 t (26,570 long tons)	3 screws, steam turbines, 22.1 kn (40.9 km/h; 25.4 mph)	1910	14 May 1913	Scuttled at Scapa Flow, 21 June 1919
SMS Prinzregent Luitpold	10 × 30.5 cm (12 in)	27,000 t (26,570 long tons)	2 screws, steam turbines, 21.7 kn (40.2 km/h; 25.0 mph)	1910	19 August 1913	Scuttled at Scapa Flow, 21 June 1919
SMS König Albert	10 × 30.5 cm (12 in)	27,000 t (26,570 long tons)	3 screws, steam turbines, 22.1 kn (40.9 km/h; 25.4 mph)	1910	31 July 1913	Scuttled at Scapa Flow, 21 June 1919

=== König class ===
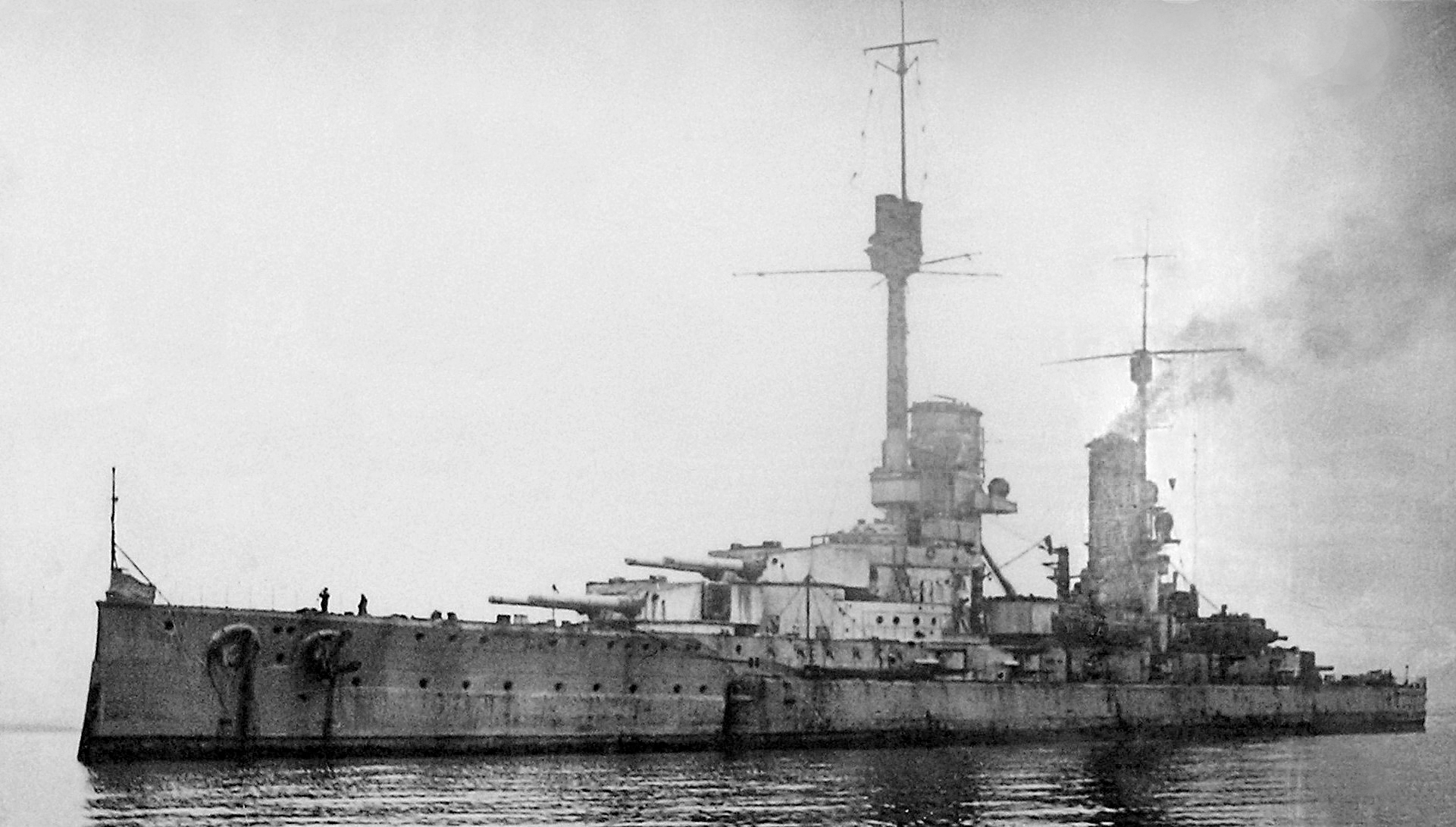
Kronprinz at Scapa Flow, 1919

König, Grosser Kurfürst, Markgraf, and Kronprinz, the four ships of the König class, were the most powerful warships of the High Seas Fleet at the outbreak of war in 1914. The Königs were an improvement over the preceding Kaiser class; one of the wing turrets was moved forward and placed in a superfiring arrangement, while the second wing turret was moved to the centerline amidships. This allowed for a wider angle of fire on the broadside, as all 10 guns could fire on a larger area compared to the earlier Kaisers.

The class operated as a unit throughout World War I—the V Division of the III Battle Squadron. The ships took part in a number of fleet operations during the war, including the Battle of Jutland, where they acted as the vanguard of the German line and were heavily engaged by the British fleet. The ships also took part in Operation Albion against the Russians in 1917, where König sank the battleship Slava. They survived the war and were interned at Scapa Flow in November 1918. All four ships were scuttled there on 21 June 1919.

Summary of the König class
Ship	Armament	Displacement	Propulsion	Service		
Ship	Armament	Displacement	Propulsion	Laid down	Commissioned	Fate
SMS König	10 × 30.5 cm (12 in)	28,600 t (28,100 long tons)	3 screws, steam turbines, 21 kn (39 km/h; 24 mph)	1911	9 August 1913	Scuttled at Scapa Flow, 21 June 1919
SMS Grosser Kurfürst	10 × 30.5 cm (12 in)	28,600 t (28,100 long tons)	3 screws, steam turbines, 21.2 kn (39.3 km/h; 24.4 mph)	1911	30 July 1914	Scuttled at Scapa Flow, 21 June 1919
SMS Markgraf	10 × 30.5 cm (12 in)	28,600 t (28,100 long tons)	3 screws, steam turbines, 21 kn (39 km/h; 24 mph)	1911	1 October 1914	Scuttled at Scapa Flow, 21 June 1919
SMS Kronprinz	10 × 30.5 cm (12 in)	28,600 t (28,100 long tons)	3 screws, steam turbines, 21.3 kn (39.4 km/h; 24.5 mph)	1912	8 November 1914	Scuttled at Scapa Flow, 21 June 1919

=== Bayern class ===
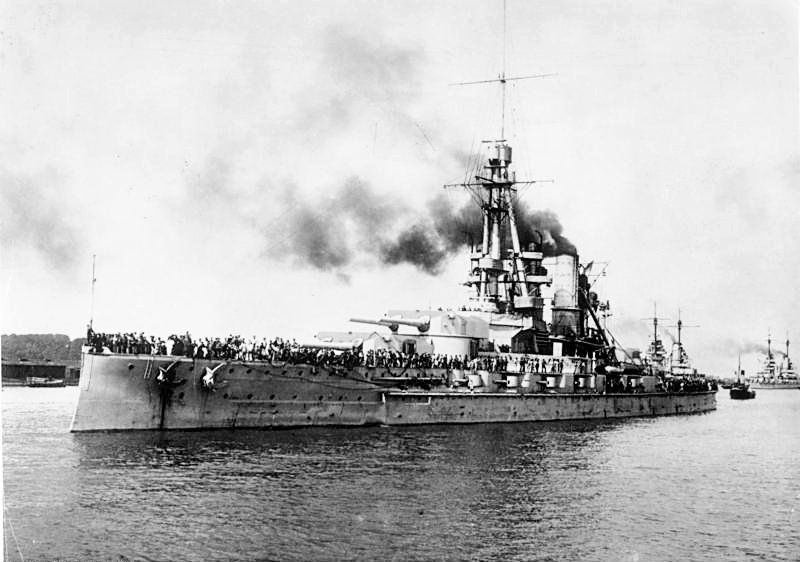
SMS Bayern on trials in 1915

The four Bayern-class ships were the first super-dreadnoughts built by the German navy. The class comprised Bayern, Baden, Sachsen, and Württemberg. Construction started on the ships shortly before World War I; Baden was laid down in 1913, Bayern and Sachsen followed in 1914, and Württemberg, the final ship, was laid down in 1915. Only Baden and Bayern were completed, as ship building priorities shifted as the war dragged on. It was determined that U-boats were more valuable to the war effort, and so work on new battleships was slowed and ultimately stopped altogether. As a result, Bayern and Baden were the last German battleships completed by the Kaiserliche Marine.

Bayern and Baden were commissioned into the fleet in July 1916 and March 1917, respectively. This was too late for either ship to take part in the Battle of Jutland on 31 May and 1 June 1916. Bayern was assigned to the naval force that drove the Imperial Russian Navy from the Gulf of Riga during Operation Albion in October 1917, though the ship was severely damaged from a mine and had to be withdrawn to Kiel for repairs. Baden replaced Friedrich der Grosse as the flagship of the High Seas Fleet, but saw no combat. Both vessels were interned at Scapa Flow following the Armistice in November 1918. Bayern was successfully scuttled on 21 July 1919, but British guards managed to beach Baden to prevent her from sinking. The ship was eventually expended as a gunnery target in 1921. Sachsen and Württemberg, both at various stages of completion when the war ended, were broken up for scrap metal in the early 1920s.

Summary of the Bayern class
Ship	Armament	Displacement	Propulsion	Service		
Ship	Armament	Displacement	Propulsion	Laid down	Commissioned	Fate
SMS Bayern	8 × 38 cm (15 in)	32,200 t (31,700 long tons)	3 screws, steam turbines, 22 kn (41 km/h; 25 mph)	1913	15 July 1916	Scuttled at Scapa Flow, 21 June 1919
SMS Baden	8 × 38 cm (15 in)	32,200 t (31,700 long tons)	3 screws, steam turbines, 21 kn (39 km/h; 24 mph)	1913	18 October 1916	Ceded to Great Britain, expended as a gunnery target in 1921
SMS Sachsen	8 × 38 cm (15 in)	32,500 t (32,000 long tons)	3 screws, steam turbines and diesel engine, 22 kn (41 km/h; 25 mph)	1914	—	Incomplete at the end of war, scrapped in 1922
SMS Württemberg	8 × 38 cm (15 in)	32,500 t (32,000 long tons)	3 screws, steam turbines, 22 kn (41 km/h; 25 mph)	1915	—	Incomplete at the end of war, scrapped in 1921

=== L 20e α class ===
The L 20e α design was a plan for an unknown number of battleships to be built in 1918 for the German navy. The design was selected on 2 October 1917, and construction was to have started 11 September 1918. The ships would have been significantly larger than the preceding Bayern class, at more than 50 m (160 ft) longer than the preceding ships. The ships would have been the first German warship to have mounted guns larger than 16 in (40.6 cm cm). However, Germany's declining war situation meant that the ships were never built.

Summary of the L 20e α class
Ship	Armament	Displacement	Propulsion	Service		
Ship	Armament	Displacement	Propulsion	Laid down	Commissioned	Fate
L 20e α	8 × 42 cm (17 in)	48,700 t (47,900 long tons)	4 screws, steam turbines, 26 kn (48 km/h; 30 mph)	—	—	Design study only

== Fast battleships ==
=== Scharnhorst class ===
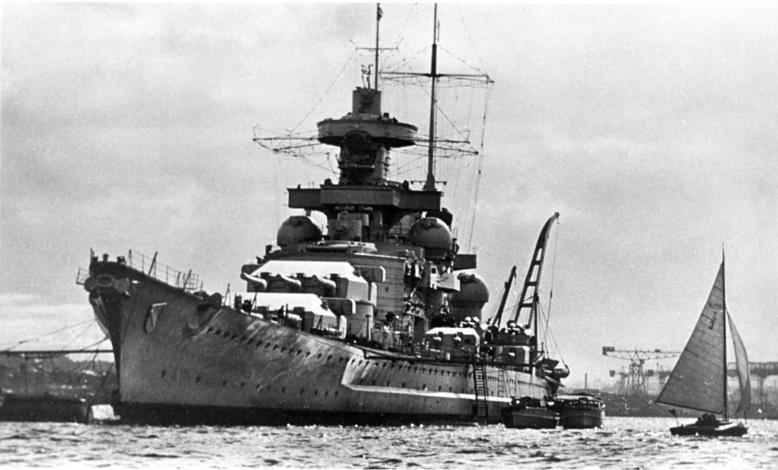
Scharnhorst in harbor in 1939

The two Scharnhorst-class battleships were the first capital ships built for the Kriegsmarine after the end of World War I. They marked the beginning of German naval rearmament after the Treaty of Versailles. The class comprised two vessels: Scharnhorst and Gneisenau. The ships were armed with nine 28 cm (11 in) SK C/34 guns in three triple turrets, though there were plans to replace these weapons with six 38 cm (15 in) SK C/34 guns in twin turrets.

The two ships were laid down in 1935, launched in late 1936, and commissioned into the German fleet by early 1939. Scharnhorst and Gneisenau operated together for much of the early portion of World War II, including sorties into the Atlantic to raid British merchant shipping. The two ships participated in Operation Weserübung, the German invasion of Norway. During operations off Norway, the two ships engaged the battlecruiser HMS Renown and sank the aircraft carrier HMS Glorious— in the engagement with Glorious, Scharnhorst achieved one of the longest-range naval gunfire hits in history. In early 1942, the two ships made a daylight dash up the English Channel from occupied France to Germany.

In late 1942, Gneisenau was heavily damaged in an Allied air raid against Kiel. In early 1943, Scharnhorst joined the Bismarck-class battleship Tirpitz in Norway to interdict Allied convoys to the Soviet Union. Scharnhorst and several destroyers sortied from Norway to attack a convoy; the Germans were instead intercepted by British naval patrols. During the Battle of North Cape, the Royal Navy battleship HMS Duke of York sank Scharnhorst. In the meantime, repair work on Gneisenau had begun, and the ship was in the process of being rearmed. However, when Scharnhorst was sunk, work on her sister was abandoned. Instead, she was sunk as a blockship in Gdynia in 1945; the wreck was broken up for scrap in the 1950s.

Summary of the Scharnhorst class
Ship	Armament	Displacement	Propulsion	Service		
Ship	Armament	Displacement	Propulsion	Laid down	Commissioned	Fate
Scharnhorst	9 × 28 cm (11 in)	38,100 long tons (38,700 t)	3 screws, steam turbines, 31.5 kn (58.3 km/h; 36.2 mph)	1935	7 January 1939	Sunk at the Battle of North Cape, 26 December 1943
Gneisenau	9 × 28 cm (11 in)	38,100 long tons (38,700 t)	3 screws, steam turbines, 31.2 kn (57.8 km/h; 35.9 mph)	1935	21 May 1938	Scuttled in Gotenhafen in 1945, raised and scrapped in 1951

=== Bismarck class ===
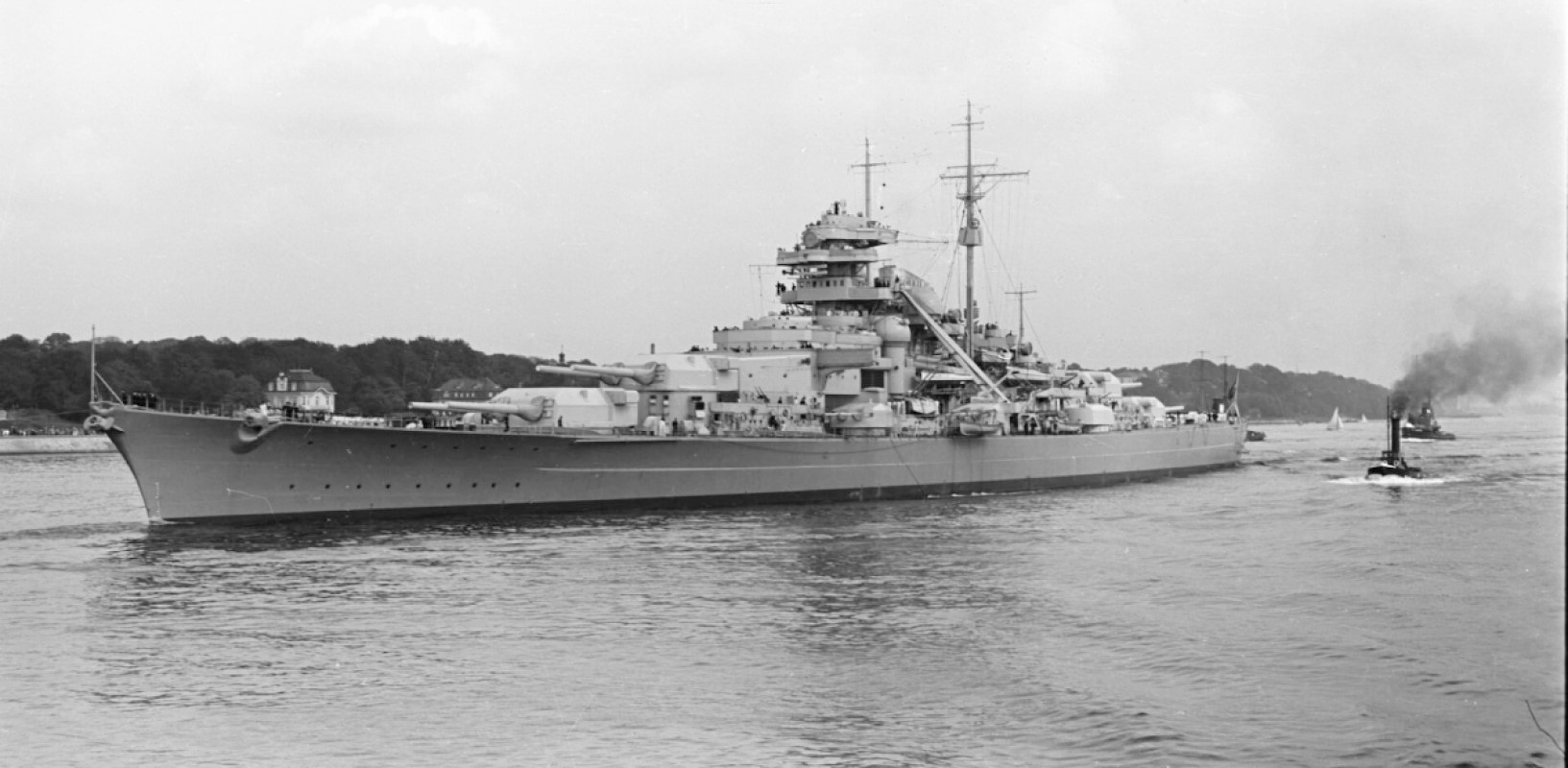
Bismarck in 1940

Bismarck and Tirpitz were the last and largest battleships completed by the German navy, as well as the heaviest ever built in Europe. They were built according to the terms of the Anglo-German Naval Agreement signed in 1935, and ostensibly displaced no more than the 35,000 long tons (36,000 t) specified in the agreement. The ships were, in actuality, some 15,000 long tons (15,000 t) heavier at full load. The ships were built to counter new French battleships then under construction.

Both ships saw combat during World War II. Bismarck was deployed in May 1941 to raid British shipping in the Atlantic Ocean along with the heavy cruiser Prinz Eugen. During the operation, Bismarck sank the battlecruiser HMS Hood and heavily damaged the new battleship HMS Prince of Wales and forced her to retreat. All of the available British naval assets were mobilized in a massive hunt to track and destroy Bismarck. Several days later, Bismarck was disabled by a torpedo hit from a Fairey Swordfish launched from HMS Ark Royal and subsequently destroyed by the battleships HMS Rodney and HMS King George V on 27 May.

Tirpitz's career was less active; she spent the majority of the war as a fleet in being in occupied Norway. The Royal Navy attempted to sink her with midget submarines, but these efforts were unsuccessful. In November 1944, RAF Lancaster bombers hit the ship three times with 12,000 lb (5,400 kg) bombs, which caused her to capsize and sink. The wreck was eventually broken up in 1948–1957.

Summary of the Bismarck class
Ship	Armament	Displacement	Propulsion	Service		
Ship	Armament	Displacement	Propulsion	Laid down	Commissioned	Fate
Bismarck	8 × 38 cm (15 in)	50,300 t (49,500 long tons)	3 screws, steam turbines, 30 kn (56 km/h; 35 mph)	1936	28 April 1940	Sunk on 27 May 1941
Tirpitz	8 × 38 cm (15 in)	52,600 t (51,800 long tons)	3 screws, geared steam turbines, 30.8 kn (57.0 km/h; 35.4 mph)	1936	25 February 1941	Sunk on 12 November 1944, scrapped 1948–1957

=== H-class proposals ===
The H-class was a series of battleship designs to fulfill the requirements of Plan Z in the late 1930s and early 1940s. The first variation, "H-39", called for six ships to be built, essentially as enlarged Bismarck-class battleships with 40.6 cm (16.0 in) guns. The "H-41" design improved the "H-39" ship with still larger main guns, with eight 42 cm (17 in) weapons. Two subsequent plans, "H-42" and "H-43", increased the main battery yet again, with 48 cm (19 in) pieces, and the monstrous "H-44" design ultimately resulted with 50.8 cm (20.0 in) guns. Due to the outbreak of war in 1939, none of the ships were ever built; only two of the "H-39" ships were laid down, and what work had been accomplished was scrapped shortly thereafter.

Summary of the H-class proposals
Ship	Armament	Displacement	Propulsion	Service		
Ship	Armament	Displacement	Propulsion	Laid down	Commissioned	Fate
H-39	8 × 40.6 cm (16 in)	62,600 long tons (63,600 t)	3 screws, diesel engines, 30 kn (56 km/h; 35 mph)	1939	—	Canceled 30 September 1939
H-41	8 × 42 cm (17 in)	74,803 long tons (76,003 t)	3 screws, diesel engines, 30 kn (56 km/h; 35 mph)	—	—	—
H-42	8 × 48 cm (19 in)	96,555 long tons (98,104 t)	Unknown	—	—	—
H-43	8 × 48 cm (19 in)	118,110 long tons (120,010 t)	Unknown	—	—	—
H-44	8 × 50.8 cm (20 in)	139,272 long tons (141,507 t)	Unknown	—	—	—
