= Freeden Bank =

- Submerged bank Freeden Bank (Antarctica)
- Interactive map of Freeden Bank
- Ocean: Southern Ocean

Freeden Bank (76°20′S 28°50′W) is a submarine bank in the Southern Ocean. It is named for Wilhelm von Freeden, the founder of the Norddeutsche Seewarte, the forerunner of the German Hydrographic Office. The name was proposed by Dr. Heinrich Hinze of the Alfred Wegener Institute for Polar and Marine Research, Bremerhaven, Germany, and was approved by the Advisory Committee for Undersea Features in June 1997.
