= Exclusive economic zone of Germany =

The Federal Republic of Germany declared the entry into force of the convention with effect from 1 January 1995, the establishment of a German Exclusive Economic Zone in the North and Baltic Seas. The relevant German legal provisions that are applicable within the exclusive economic zone include the Maritime Task Act (Seeaufgabengesetz) from 1965, the Maritime Facilities Act (Seeanlagengesetz) from 2017, before that the Sea Facilities Ordinance (Seeanlagenverordnung) since 1997, the Federal Mining Act (Bundesberggesetz) and the Regional Planning Act (Raumordnungsgesetz).

The German EEZ has an area of 32,982 km^{2}. 70% of the EEZ is the entire German North Sea area and about 29% is the entire German Baltic Sea area.

Driven by the approval process for planned Offshore-Windparks, a spatial planning plan issued by the Federal Ministry of Transport and Digital Infrastructure came into force for the North Sea area on 26 September 2009, for the much smaller Baltic Sea area on 19 December 2009. For the German exclusive economic zone, Germany has reported ten Natura 2000 areas to the EU Commission.

== Nature reserves ==
Naturschutzgebiet (green) in the German exclusive economic zone

Six marine areas in the German EEZ are designated as Naturschutzgebiet (nature reserves):

- Borkum-Riffgrund
- Doggerbank
- Fehmarnbelt
- Kadetrinne
- Pommersche Bucht
- Sylter Außenriff – Östliche Deutsche Bucht

== Historical disputes ==
In 2014, Germany and the Kingdom of the Netherlands resolved part of a centuries-old border dispute regarding the exact location of the border in the Dollart Bay.

== See also ==
- Entenschnabel (German EEZ in the North Sea)
- Continental shelf
- Mittelplate (oil field)
