= RV Atair =

German research and survey ship

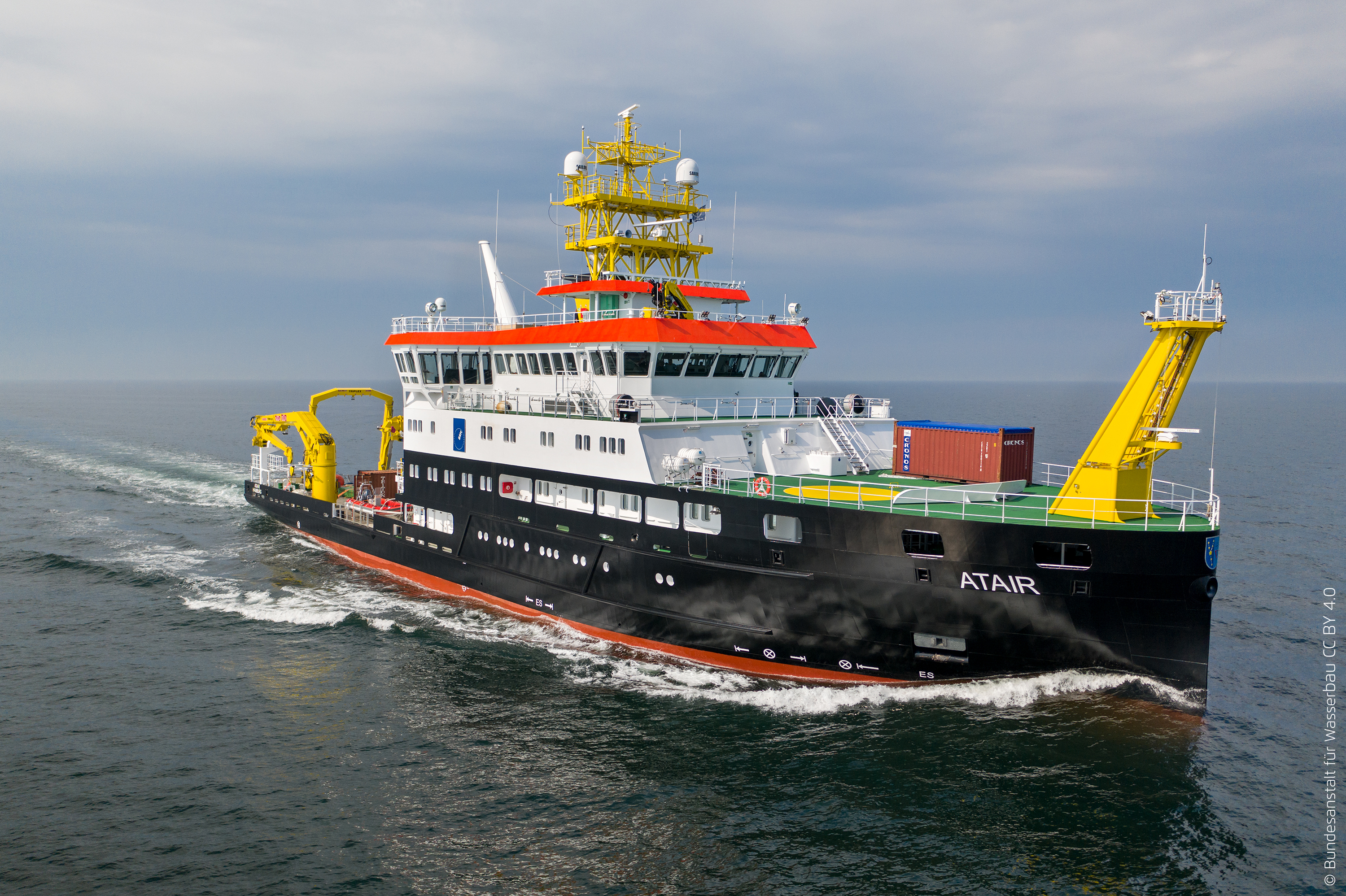
- Atair conducting sea trials in June 2020

History

Germany
- Name: RV Atair
- Owner: Federal Maritime and Hydrographic Agency of Germany
- Operator: Federal Maritime and Hydrographic Agency of Germany
- Port of registry: Germany
- Builder: Fassmer Werft and German Naval Yards
- Cost: €113.8 million
- Laid down: December 2017
- Launched: February 2019
- In service: April 2021
- Homeport: Hamburg
- Identification: IMO number: 9835496

General characteristics
- Class & type: Research vessel
- Length: 75 m (246 ft)
- Beam: 16.8 m (55 ft)
- Draft: 5 m (16 ft)
- Installed power: Wärtsilä dual fuel
- Speed: 13 knots (24 km/h)
- Crew: 18 crew; 15 passengers

RV Atair is a research vessel owned and operated by the Federal Maritime and Hydrographic Agency of Germany (BSH). She entered service in 2021 and replaces a 1987-built research vessel also named Atair.

== History ==
BSH issued a request for proposals for a new research vessel in October 2014, and completed design work for the ship early in 2015. The ship was originally planned to have a cost of about €80 million and enter service late in the decade. The €113.8 million contract for overall engineering and construction of the ship was awarded to Kongsberg. Construction of Atair was sub-contracted to two German shipyards—Fassmer Werft and German Naval Yards (GNY). Construction began in December 2017, and the hull and superstructure were launched at German Naval Yards in February 2019. Following some fitting out work, including the installation of the main powerplants, Atair was transported to Fassmer Werft the following month to be completed. Sea trials began in late 2019 and continued through September 2020 ahead of the expected delivery of Atair late in 2020. Upon her entry into service for BSH, which will own and operate Atair, she will replace the 1987-built Atair and operate primarily in the Baltic Sea, the North Sea, and the North Atlantic Ocean.

== Design ==
Atair measures 75 metres (246 ft) long, 16.8 metres (55 ft) wide, and has a draft of 5 metres (16 ft). She is powered by three Wärtsilä engines, two of which are LNG-capable, that give her a service speed of up to 13 knots (24 km/h) through a single propeller. Atair is the first research vessel in the world to have an LNG-fueled propulsion system. The crew complement is 18 sailors, with accommodations for up to 15 researchers. Scientific facilities on board include several types of sonar, laboratories, rigging to support the deployment of off-vessel equipment, and deck space to house additional temporary equipment.
