= Bay of Pomerania (nature reserve) =

Bay of Pomerania Pommersche Bucht
- Marine protected area
- Bay of Pomerania (nature reserve) (Baltic Sea)
- Interactive map of Bay of Pomerania
- Sea: Baltic Sea
- State: Mecklenburg-Vorpommern
- Country: Germany

The Bay of Pomerania Nature Reserve (German: Naturschutzgebiet Pommersche Bucht) is a coastal region east of the German island of Rügen in Germany's exclusive economic zone and the continental shelf of the Baltic Sea. It was created on 15 September 2005 by the Red-Green federal government and, together with the Sylt Outer Reef Nature Reserve (Naturschutzgebiet Sylter Außenriff), is one of the few nature reserves established by the federation.

== Protected area ==
The area is part of a European bird reserve, i.e. a Special Protection Area under the Habitats Directive. It has an area of 200,938 hectares and lies east of the island of Rügen and runs from the northern edge of the Adlergrund south of the Arkonasee to the outer boundary of the German exclusive economic zone with Poland in the east as well as in the south to the boundary of the German coastal sea north of the Oder estuary. In the north the Rønnebank and the Adlergrund separate the region from the Arkona Basin.

The conservation order aims to preserve and reinstate the sea region's function as a feeding, overwintering, moulting, migration and rest area for the species living there, especially for red-throated loon (Gavia stellata), black-throated loon (Gavia arctica), horned grebe (Podiceps auritus), little gull (Larus minutus), common tern (Sterna hirundo), Arctic tern (Sterna paradisaea), red-necked grebe (Podiceps grisegena), long-tailed duck (Clangula hyernalis), scoter (Melanitta nigra), velvet scoter (Melanitta fusca), common gull (Larus canus), lesser black-backed gull (Larus fiscus), guillemot (Uria aalge), razorbill (Alca torda) and black guillemot (Cepphus grylle).

== See also ==
- Adlergrund
- Bay of Pomerania
