= Wilhelm von Freeden =

German mathematician (1822–1894)

Wilhelm Ihno Adolf von Freeden (12 May 1822 Norden, German Confederation – 11 January 1894 Bonn) was a German mathematician and expert on navigation. He was the founder of the North German Naval Observatory. Freeden Bank bears his name.

== Biography ==
He was educated at the universities of Bonn and Göttingen. He was director of the school of navigation at Elsfleth, Oldenburg, and later settled in Hamburg.

=== North German Naval Observatory ===
In Hamburg, in 1867, he founded the private North German Naval Observatory (Norddeutsche Seewarte), which he directed until 1875 when it became the German Naval Observatory (Deutsche Seewarte), an agency of the German Empire. The purpose of the observatory was to promote and to facilitate maritime intercourse. It was composed of a department of maritime meteorology; a bureau of nautical, meteorological, and magnetic instruments; a department of coast meteorology and signal service; and a bureau for testing chronometers. In 1945, the tasks of the German Naval Observatory were turned over to the German Hydrographic Institute (Deutsche Hydrographische Institut), and in 1990 that agency in turn became part of the present day Federal Department of Shipping and Hydrography (Bundesamt für Seeschifffahrt und Hydrographie).

=== Other activities ===
Freeden was a member of the Reichstag from 1871 to 1876. He founded, with H. Tecklenborg-Bremen, a publication entitled Hansa, Zeitschrift für Seewesen, which he edited until 1891.
