= Bay of Pomerania =

Landform in Poland and Germany

Coordinates: 54.067°N 14.083°E

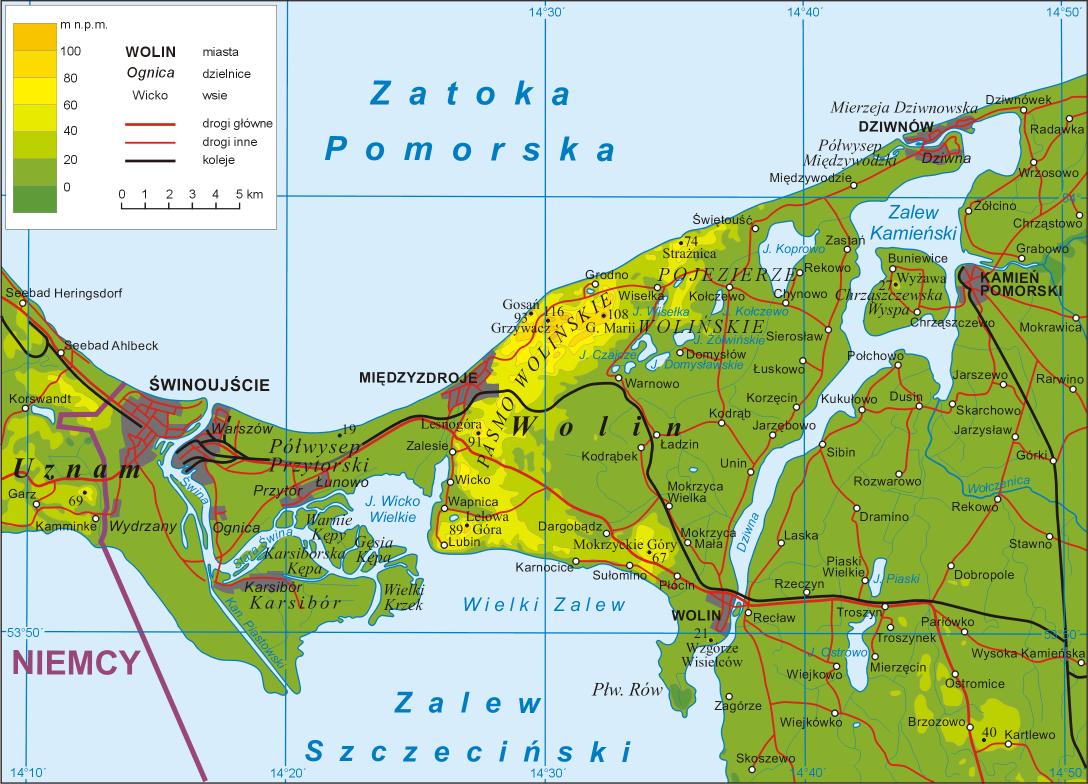
- Interactive map of Bay of Pomerania
- Location: Baltic Sea
- Type: Bay
- Basin countries: Coastal: Poland, Germany

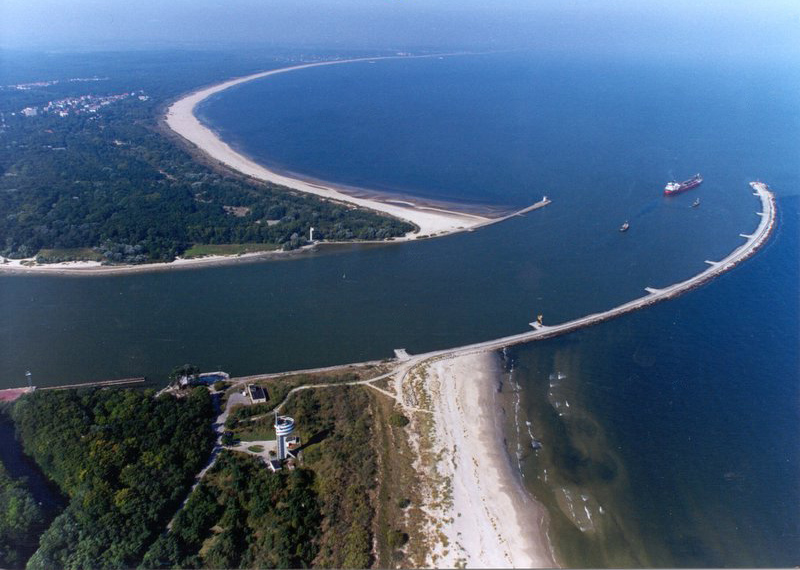
The river mouth of Świna at the Baltic Sea in Świnoujście, Poland

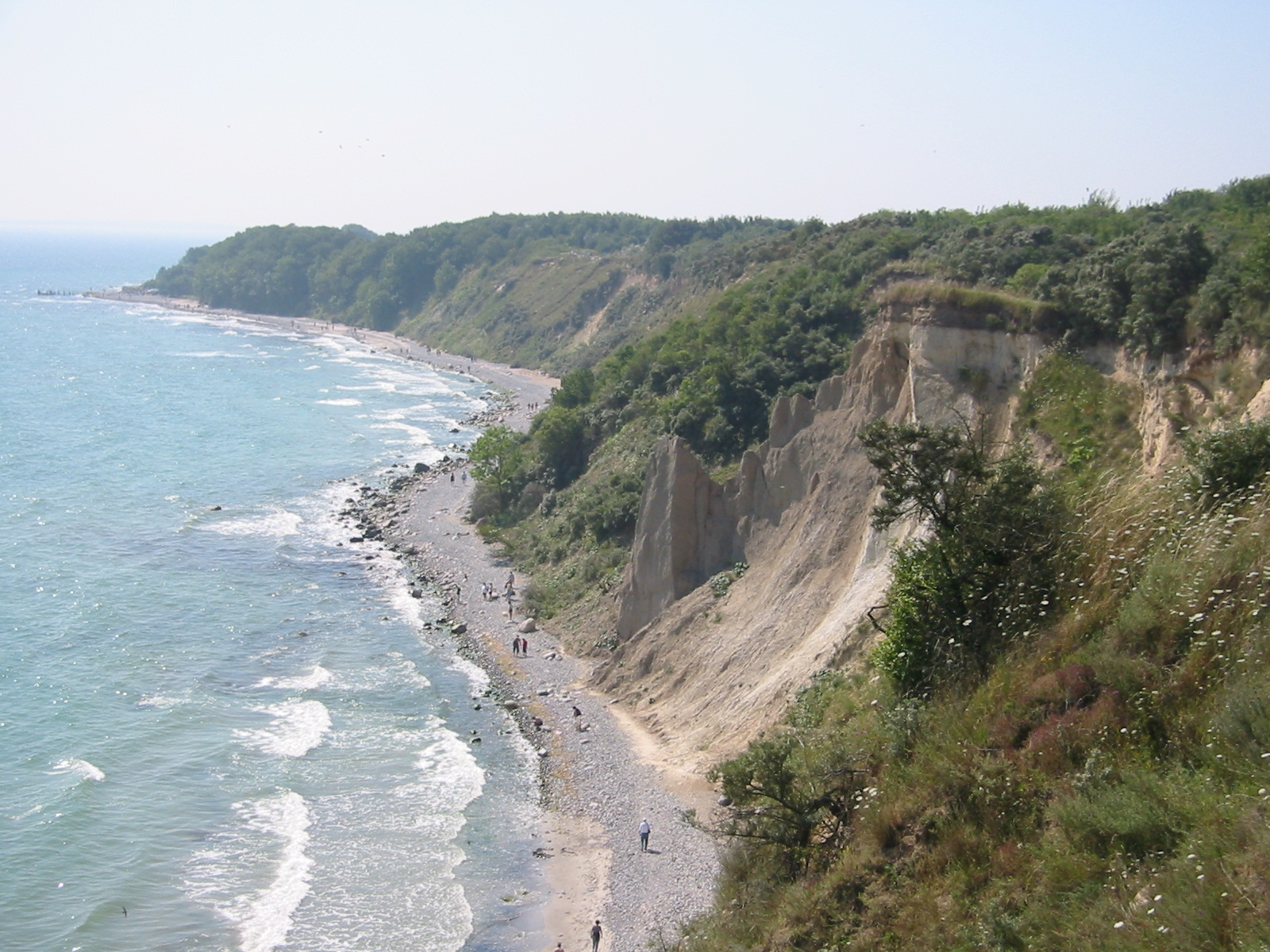
coast east of Cape Arkona on the island of Rügen, Germany

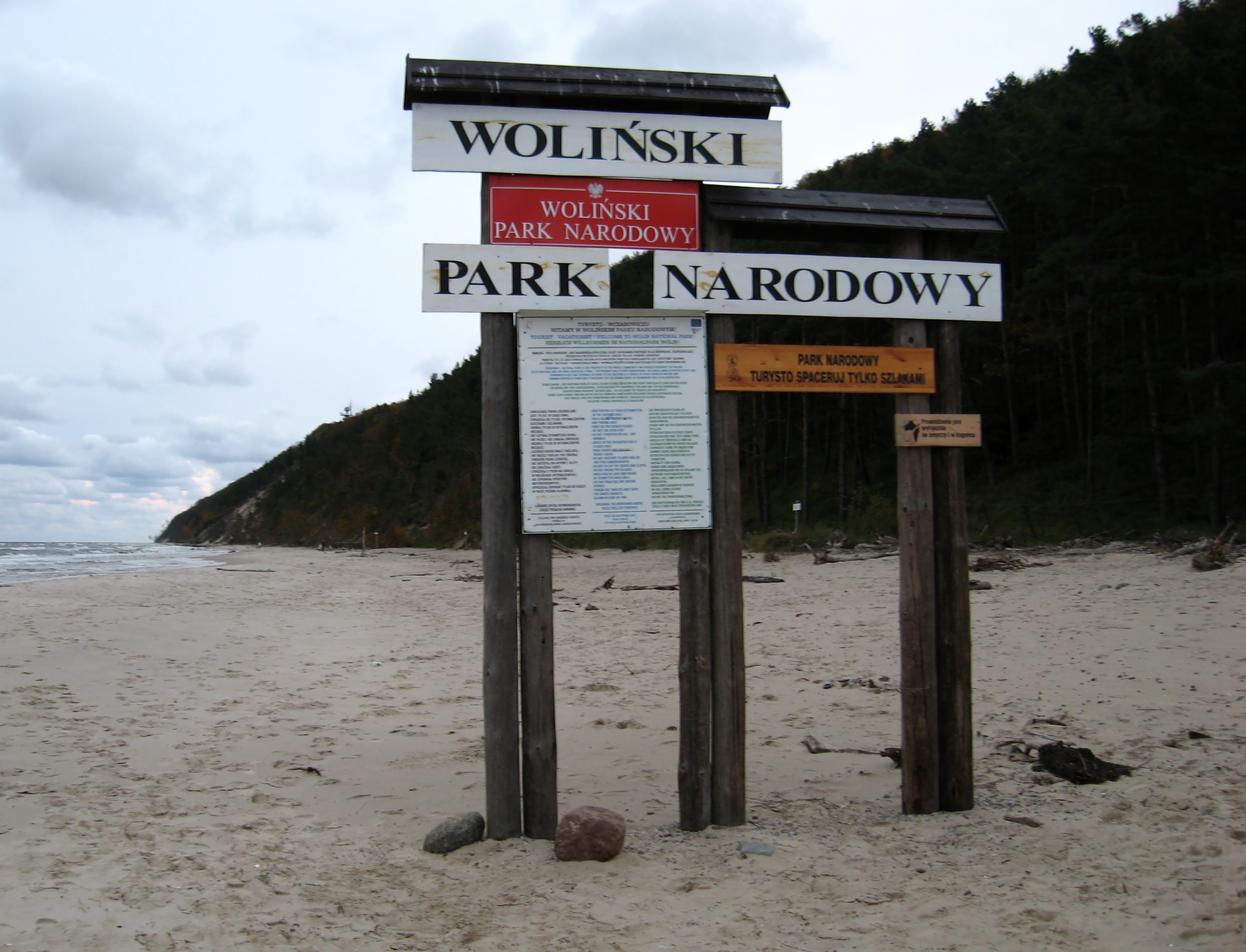
Wolin National Park, Poland

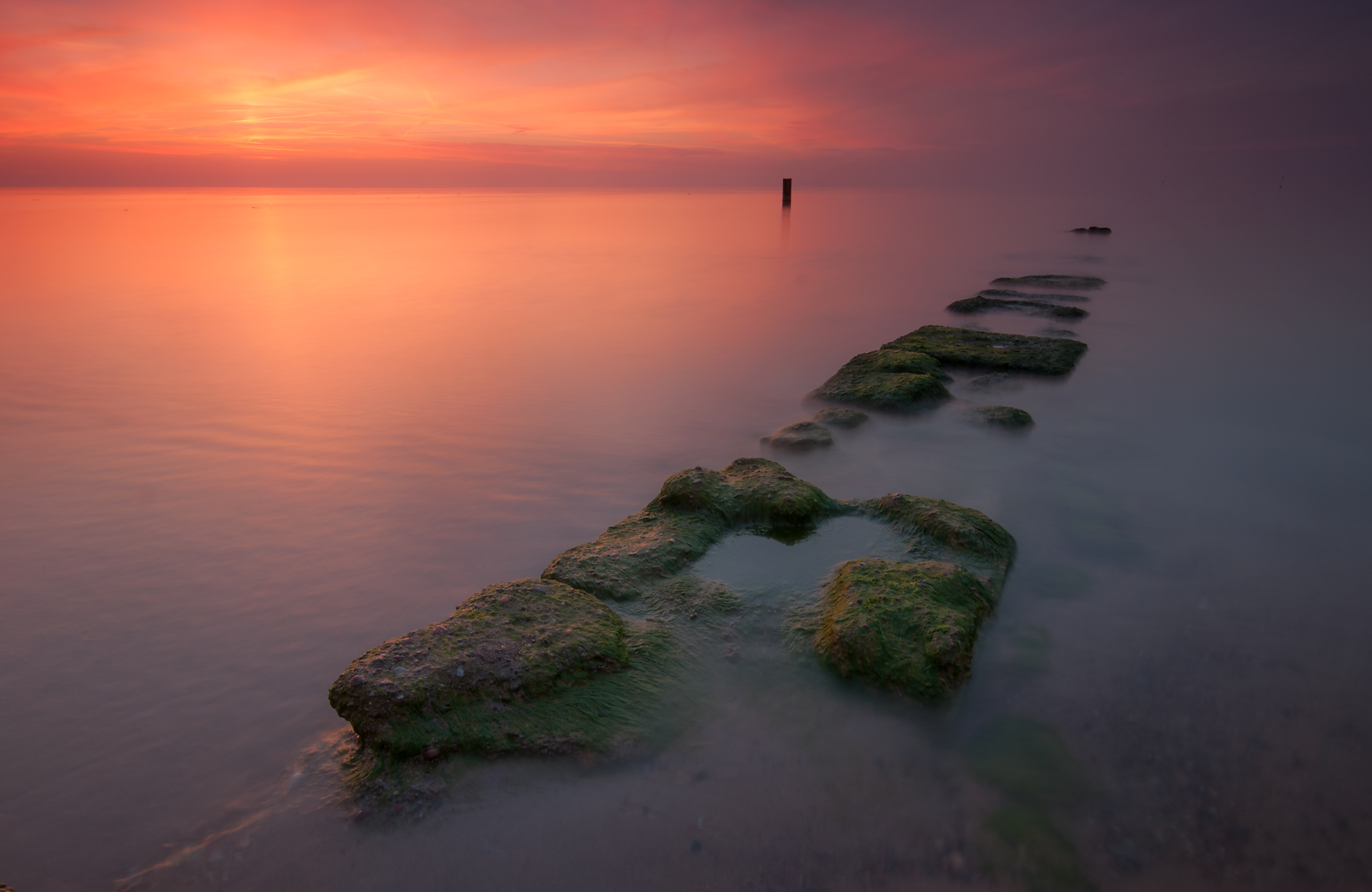
Breakwaters of Sarbinowo at sunset

The Bay of Pomerania or Pomeranian Bight (Polish: Zatoka Pomorska [zaˈtɔ.ka pɔˈmɔr.ska]; German: Pommersche Bucht; Kashubian: Pòmòrskô Hôwinga) is a basin in the southwestern Baltic Sea, off the Pomeranian shores of Poland and Germany. It stretches between the northernmost tip of the island of Rügen called Gellort northwest of Cape Arkona in the west, and the village of Jarosławiec in the east. In the south, it is bounded by the islands of Usedom/Uznam and Wolin, which separate it from the Szczecin Lagoon which is flown through by the Oder River, and is connected to the bay by three straits, the Dziwna, Świna, and Peenestrom.

The Bay of Greifswald with the islands of Koos and Vilm is a large sub-bay in the southwest of the Bay of Pomerania. Apart from Rügen, Usedom/Uznam, and Wolin, the islands Greifswalder Oie and Ruden also lie in the Bay of Pomerania. Maximum depth is 20 metres (66 ft) and salinity is about 8%. The main ports on the Bay of Pomerania are Mukran Port in Sassnitz-Mukran, the port of Świnoujście, the port of Kołobrzeg, the port of Greifswald on the mouth of the Ryck River in Greifswald-Wieck, the port of Dziwnów, and the port of Wolgast.

== See also ==
- Bay of Pomerania Nature Reserve
