= Adlergrund =

Adlergrund Ławica Orla
- Submerged bank
- Coordinates: 54°45′N 14°24′E
- Sea: Baltic Sea
- Region: Off Cape Arkona
- Country: Germany
- Minimum depth: 5 m

Adlergrund (Polish: Ławica Orla) , also known as Eagle’s Bench, is a shoal located in the Baltic Sea, at the SW end of the Rönnebank, Germany. It is the shallowest of the Baltic Sea banks, which is about 5 metres (15 ft) deep.

The shoal is a protected marine area with an extension of about 234 km^{2}.

== Geography ==
It lies roughly 55 km to the ENE of Cape Arkona, the headland at the northern end of Rügen Island, and 60 km to the SSW of Bornholm. Geographically it is a SW extension of the Rönnebank that runs south of Bornholm. The submerged shoal's shallowest point is about 5 meters deep at the time of the lowest astronomical tide.

== History ==
Since it comprises large shallow areas dangerous for navigation, Lightship Adlergrund —a lightvessel of the German Hydrographic Office, was anchored on the reef in the period 1884 – 1914 and again in 1922 – 1941.

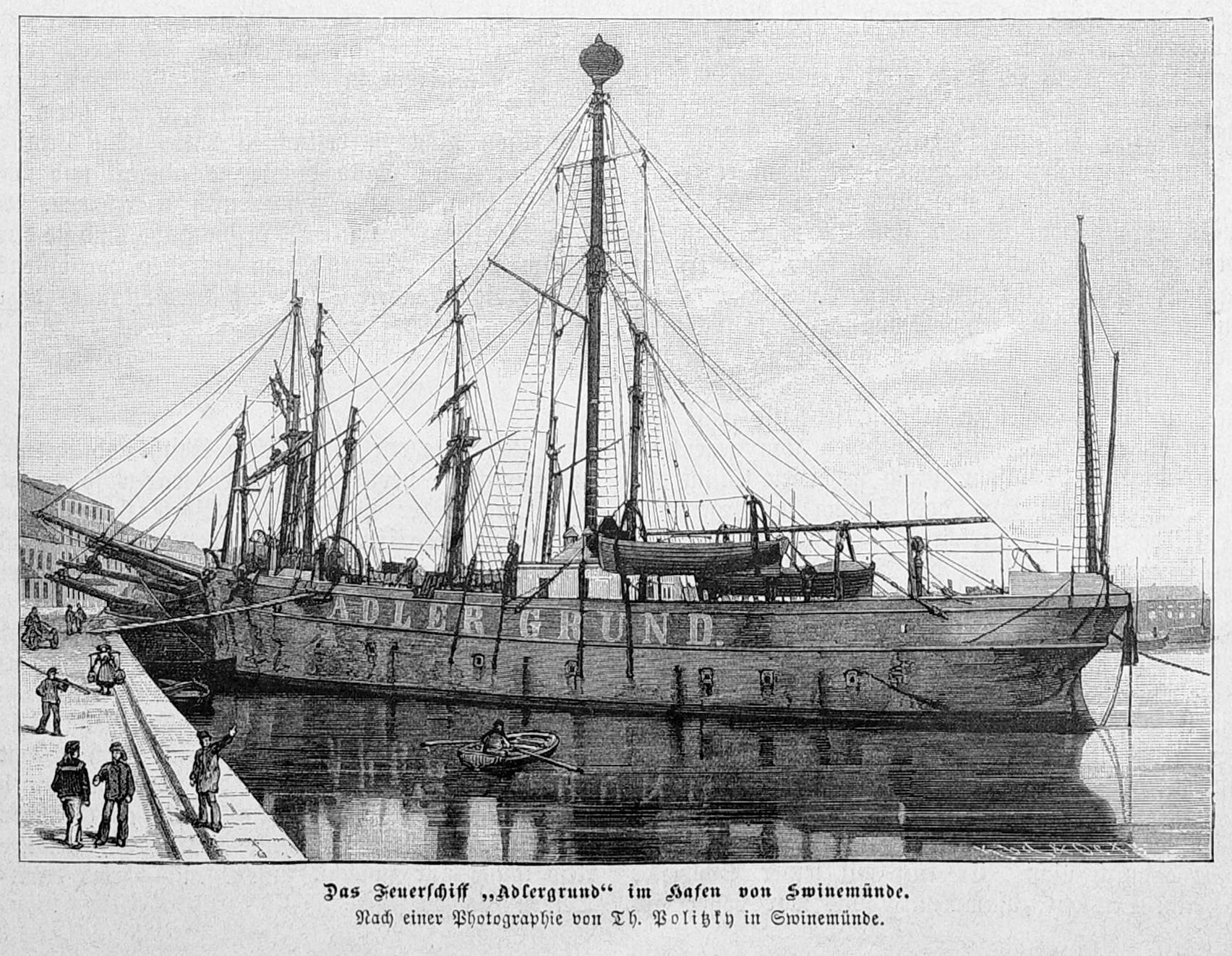
Lightship Adlergrund I (1884)

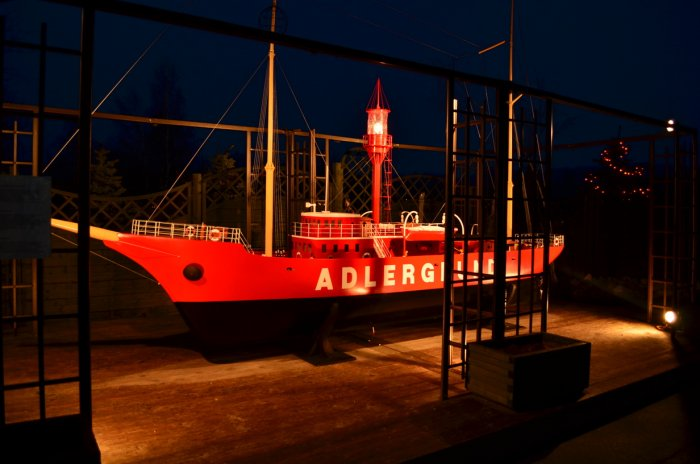
Lightship Adlergrund II (1922)

Currently the construction of two wind farms is planned on the Adlergrund Shoal under the name Wind Energy Network Rostock project.

== See also ==
- List of shipwrecks in 1938
- Lightvessels
