= Federal Maritime and Hydrographic Agency =

Federal office

Federal Maritime and Hydrographic Agency Bundesamt für Seeschifffahrt und Hydrographie

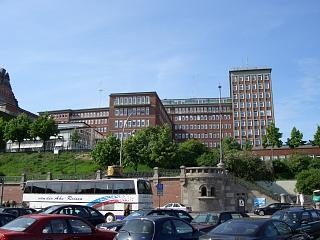
- BSH buildings in Hamburg-St. Pauli, Bernhard-Nocht-Straße
- Abbreviation: BSH
- Formation: 1868 as Norddeutsche Seewarte
- Type: Government agency
- Purpose: Maritime and navigational safety, environmental monitoring
- Headquarters: Hamburg
- Region served: Germany
- Official language: German
- President: Helge Heegewaldt
- Parent organization: Federal Ministry of Transport and Digital Infrastructure
- Website: www.bsh.de

The Federal Maritime and Hydrographic Agency of Germany (German: Bundesamt für Seeschifffahrt und Hydrographie, BSH) is a German federal authority based in Hamburg and Rostock. With some 800 employees, the agency's tasks include maritime safety, hydrographic survey, maritime pollution monitoring, and approvals of offshore installations.

== History ==
The agency can be traced back to Norddeutsche Seewarte (North German Naval Observatory), founded in 1867 by Wilhelm von Freeden, which issued individual sailing directions based on nautical and meteorological observations as early as 1868. After World War II, the Deutsches Hydrographisches Institut (DHI) [German Hydrographical Institute] was founded in 1945 and took over these tasks. While it was first active throughout all four zones of Allied-occupied Germany, operations in the Soviet zone ceased when the DHI became part of the Western Allies' unified zone which was to become the state of West Germany. After the German reunification of 1990, the DHI was merged with Bundesamt für Schiffsvermessung (BAS) [Federal Agency for Tonnage Measurement] to form the Federal Maritime and Hydrographic Agency. At the same time, the Seehydrographischer Dienst [Maritime Hydrographical Service] of East Germany which was part of the People's Navy was taken over.

== Tasks ==
The Federal Maritime and Hydrographic Agency provides maritime services for shipping, economy and marine environment. It is a federal agency within the portfolio of the Federal Ministry of Transport and Digital Infrastructure. The various tasks include:

- Facilitation of the German merchant marine,
- Tonnage measurement and matter related to flags of convenience,
- Issue of certificates for sailors,
- Testing and approval of navigational and radio equipment,
- Maritime hazard control,
- Issue of official nautical charts, handbooks and other nautical publications such as notice to mariners for professional and recreational shipping,
- Bathymetry of North Sea and Baltic Sea,
- Calculation and forecasts of tide tables, water levels and storm tides,
- Monitoring of the marine environment which includes the operation of several fixed automated stations,
- Investigation of environmental pollution at sea,
- Maritime spatial planning for the exclusive economic zone (EEZ) of Germany,
- Approval of commercial offshore activities like wind farming, pipelines or submarine communications cables in the German EEZ of North Sea and Baltic.

The agency is moreover represented in a number of national and international panels.

The head office of Federal Bureau for Maritime Casualty Investigation is in the BSH facility.

== Vessels ==
The Federal Maritime and Hydrographic Agency maintains a fleet of five survey vessels as of 2013. Atair is expected to be replaced in 2020 by a new vessel, also named Atair.

- Atair, based in Hamburg
- Deneb, based in Rostock
- Wega, based in Hamburg
- Capella, based in Hamburg
- Komet, based in Hamburg

== Messages in bottles ==
According to its own accounts, the BSH's library hosts the world's largest known collection of messages in a bottle amounting to 660 items.
