= Armstrong =

Armstrong(s) may refer to:

== Places ==
- Armstrong Creek (disambiguation), various places
- Armstrong River (disambiguation), various rivers

=== Antarctica ===
- Armstrong Reef, Biscoe Islands

=== Argentina ===
- Armstrong, Santa Fe

=== Australia ===
- Armstrong, Victoria

=== Canada ===
- Armstrong, British Columbia
- Armstrong, Ontario
- Armstrong, Thunder Bay District, Ontario
- Armstrong, Ontario (Indian settlement)

=== United States ===
- Armstrong, California
- Armstrong, Delaware
- Armstrong, Florida
- Armstrong, Georgia
- Armstrong, Illinois
- Armstrong, Indiana
- Armstrong, Iowa
- Armstrong, Minnesota
- Armstrong, Missouri
- Armstrong, Oklahoma
- Armstrong, Bell County, Texas
- Armstrong, Kenedy County, Texas
- Armstrong, Wisconsin
- Armstrong County, Pennsylvania
- Armstrong County, Texas
- Armstrong Lake (Blue Earth County, Minnesota), a lake in Minnesota
- Armstrong Township, Vanderburgh County, Indiana
- Armstrong Township, Pennsylvania (disambiguation), more than one, including
  - Armstrong Township, Indiana County, Pennsylvania
  - Armstrong Township, Lycoming County, Pennsylvania
- Louis Armstrong New Orleans International Airport
- Armstrong Tunnel, in Pittsburgh, Pennsylvania

== People and fictional characters ==
- Armstrong (surname), including a list of people with the surname
- Clan Armstrong, a Scottish clan from the border area between England and Scotland
- Armstrong Williams (born 1962), American political commentator
- Armstrong, a character in the Valiant Comics comic book Archer & Armstrong

== Companies ==
- Armstrong Audio, a British audio/hi-fi manufacturer
- Armstrong Flooring, a manufacturer of flooring
- Armstrong Group of Companies, a conglomerate begun in Armstrong County, Pennsylvania
- Armstrong Studios, Australian recording studios (1965–2006; also known as Armstrong's)
- Armstrong Telephone Company, a telecommunications provider serving as a local exchange carrier in rural market
- Armstrong Tools, an industrial hand tool manufacturer
- Armstrong Whitworth, the British engineering conglomerate which became Vickers-Armstrong
- Armstrong Whitworth Aircraft, a separate entity
- Armstrong World Industries, a manufacturer of ceilings and walls

== Other uses ==
- 6469 Armstrong, minor planet
- Armstrong (automobile), an early English car
- Armstrong (content management system), an open source news publishing platform
- Armstrong (crater), a lunar crater
- "Armstrong" (DuckTales episode)
- "Armstrong" (song), a song by French singer Claude Nougaro
- Armstrong Atlantic State University, a public university in Savannah, Georgia
- Armstrong Flight Research Center, a NASA research center
- Armstrong Gun, a rifled breech-loading artillery piece
- Armstrong Whitworth Whitley, World War II bomber
- The Armstrongs, a British television series
- Armstrongs, a band including Billie Joe Armstrong and Tim Armstrong
- Armstrong's axioms, a set of axioms used to infer all the functional dependencies on a relational database

== See also ==
- Ångström (disambiguation)
- Armstrong-CCM Motorcycles
- Armstrongs Mills, Ohio
- Armstrong's mixture
- Armstrong's Point
- Armstrong's Wife, a film
- George Armstrong Custer
- Vickers-Armstrongs
