= Ottoman ironclad Orhaniye =

Ironclad warship of the Ottoman Navy

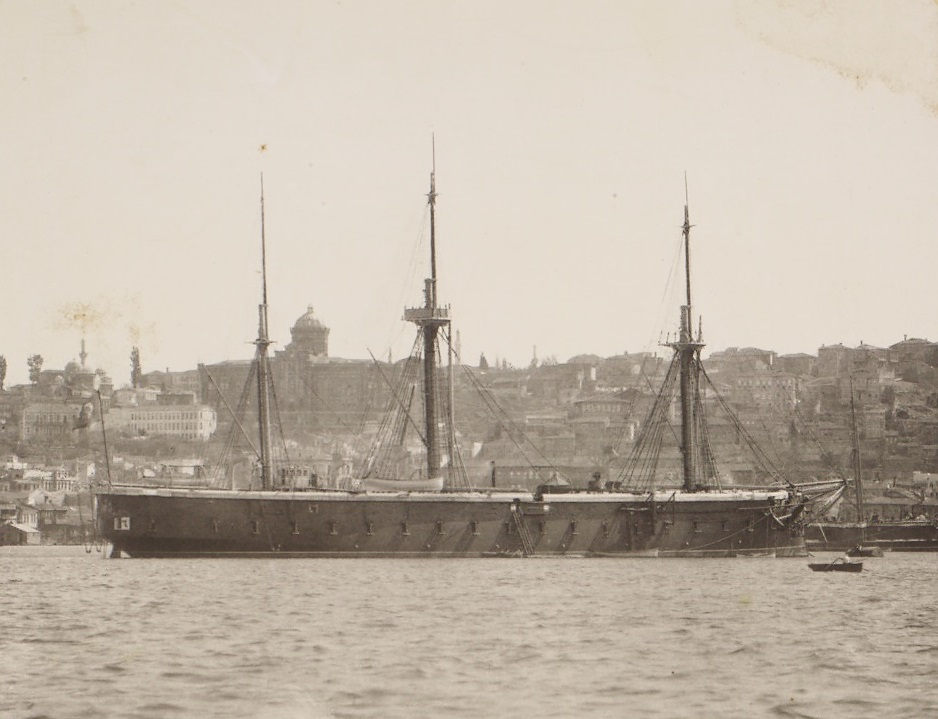
- Orhaniye in the Golden Horn

History

Ottoman Empire
- Name: Orhaniye
- Builder: Robert Napier and Sons
- Laid down: 1863
- Launched: 26 June 1865
- Commissioned: 1866
- Decommissioned: 31 July 1909
- Fate: Broken up, 1913

General characteristics
- Class & type: Osmaniye class
- Displacement: 6,400 metric tons (6,300 long tons; 7,100 short tons)
- Length: 91.4 m (299 ft 10 in) (loa)
- Beam: 16.9 m (55 ft 5 in)
- Draft: 7.9 m (25 ft 11 in)
- Installed power: 6 × box boilers
- Propulsion: 1 × compound steam engine; 1 × screw propeller
- Speed: 13.5 knots (25.0 km/h; 15.5 mph)
- Complement: 26 officers; 335 enlisted men
- Armament: 1 × 229 mm (9 in) RML Armstrong gun; 14 × 203 mm (8 in) RML Armstrong guns; 10 × 36-pounder Armstrong guns
- Armor: Belt: 140 mm (5.5 in); Battery: 127 mm (5 in)

Orhaniye was an ironclad warship built for the Ottoman Navy by Robert Napier and Sons of the United Kingdom in the 1860s, the third of four members of the Osmaniye class. The ship's keel was laid down in 1863 and she was launched in June 1865. A broadside ironclad, Orhaniye carried a battery of fourteen 203 mm (8 in) RML Armstrong guns and ten 36-pounder Armstrongs in a traditional broadside arrangement, with a single 229 mm (9 in) RML as a chase gun. Among the more powerful of Ottoman ironclads, the Navy decided to keep the ship safely in the Mediterranean Sea during the Russo-Turkish War of 1877–1878 to preserve the vessel. She spent the 1880s out of service, though she was heavily rebuilt in the early 1890s and converted into a more modern barbette ship. She was nevertheless in poor condition by the time of the Greco-Turkish War in 1897, as a result saw no action, and was disarmed after the war. She was used as a barracks ship following her decommissioning in 1909, though this duty lasted only until 1913, when she was sold for scrap.

== Design ==
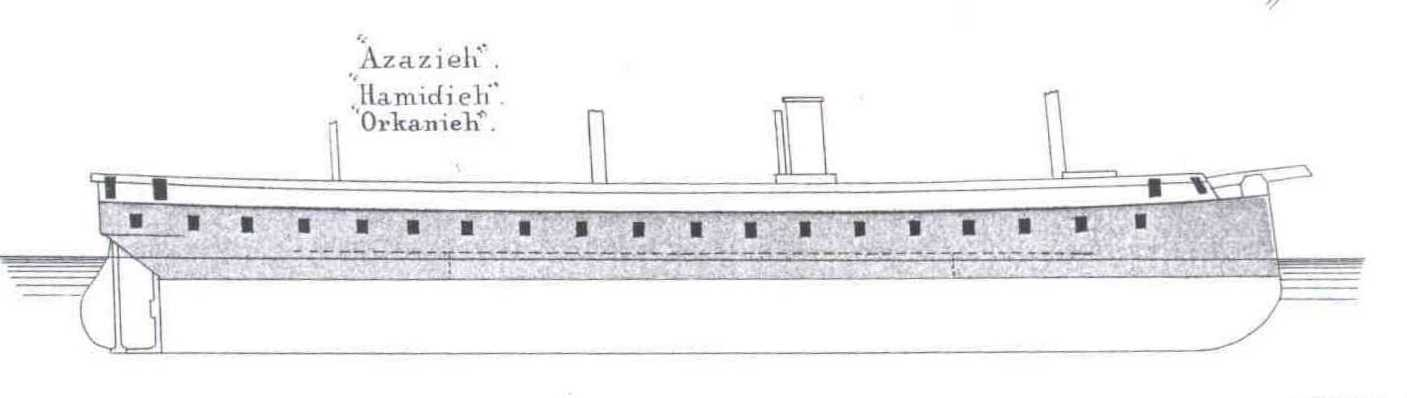
Profile drawing of the Osmaniye class

Orhaniye was 91.4 m (299 ft 10 in) long overall, with a beam of 16.9 m (55 ft 5 in) and a draft of 7.9 m (25 ft 11 in). The hull was constructed with iron, incorporated a ram bow, and displaced 6,400 metric tons (6,300 long tons; 7,100 short tons) normally and 4,211 t (4,144 long tons; 4,642 short tons) BOM. She had a crew of 26 officers and 335 enlisted men as completed, but only 250 after 1894.

The ship was powered by a single horizontal compound steam engine which drove one screw propeller. Steam was provided by six coal-fired box boilers that were trunked into a single, retractable funnel amidships. The engine produced a top speed of 13.5 knots (25.0 km/h; 15.5 mph) on sea trials, though by 1891, decades of poor maintenance had reduced the ship's speed to 6 knots (11 km/h; 6.9 mph). Orhaniye carried 750 t (740 long tons; 830 short tons) of coal. A supplementary barque rig with three masts was also fitted.

The ship was armed with a battery of one 229 mm (9 in) rifled muzzle-loading (RML) Armstrong gun and fourteen 203 mm (8 in) RML Armstrongs. These were supplemented with ten 36-pounder guns, also manufactured by Armstrong. The 229 mm gun was placed on the upper deck, forward, and the rest of the guns were mounted on each broadside. The ship's wrought iron armored belt was 140 mm (5.5 in) thick, and was capped with 76 mm (3 in) thick transverse bulkhead at either end. Above the belt were strakes of armor 127 mm (5 in) thick that protected the battery, transverse bulkheads 114 mm (4.5 in) connected the battery armor.

== Service history ==
Orhaniye was built by the Robert Napier and Sons shipyard in Glasgow, where she was ordered in 1862. Her keel was laid down in 1863 and she was launched on 26 June 1865. She began sea trials in 1866 and was commissioned into the fleet later that year. Early in the ship's career, the Ottoman ironclad fleet was activated every summer for short cruises from the Golden Horn to the Bosporus to ensure their propulsion systems were in operable condition.

The Ottoman fleet began mobilizing in September 1876 to prepare for a conflict with Russia, as tensions with the country had been growing for several years, an insurrection had begun in Ottoman Bosnia in mid-1875, and Serbia had declared war on the Ottoman Empire in July 1876. At the start of 1877, the ship was assigned to the 2nd Division of the Mediterranean Fleet, based in Crete, along with the ironclads Muin-i Zafer and Asar-i Tevfik. The Russo-Turkish War began on 24 April 1877 with a Russian declaration of war, but unlike many of the other, smaller Ottoman ironclads, Orhaniye and her sister ships remained in the Mediterranean Fleet. The Navy feared losing the largest ships of its fleet, and so kept them primarily in port for the duration of the conflict. The wooden warships of the Mediterranean Fleet sortied in April 1877 to patrol the coast of Albania, but Orhaniye and the rest of the ironclads remained in Souda Bay.

After the conclusion of the war in 1878, Orhaniye was laid up in Constantinople. The annual summer cruises to the Bosporus ended. By the mid-1880s, the Ottoman ironclad fleet was in poor condition, and Orhaniye was unable to go to sea. Many of the ships' engines were unusable, having seized up from rust, and their hulls were badly fouled. The British naval attache to the Ottoman Empire at the time estimated that the Imperial Arsenal would take six months to get just five of the ironclads ready to go to sea. During this period, the ship's crew was limited to about one-third the normal figure. In 1884, the 36-pounder gun were removed and a light battery of four 47 mm (1.9 in) quick-firing (QF) Hotchkiss guns and two 4-barreled 25.4 mm (1 in) Nordenfelt guns were added. During a period of tension with Greece in 1886, the fleet was brought to full crews and the ships were prepared to go to sea, but none actually left the Golden Horn, and they were quickly laid up again. By that time, most of the ships were capable of little more than 4 to 6 knots (7.4 to 11.1 km/h; 4.6 to 6.9 mph).

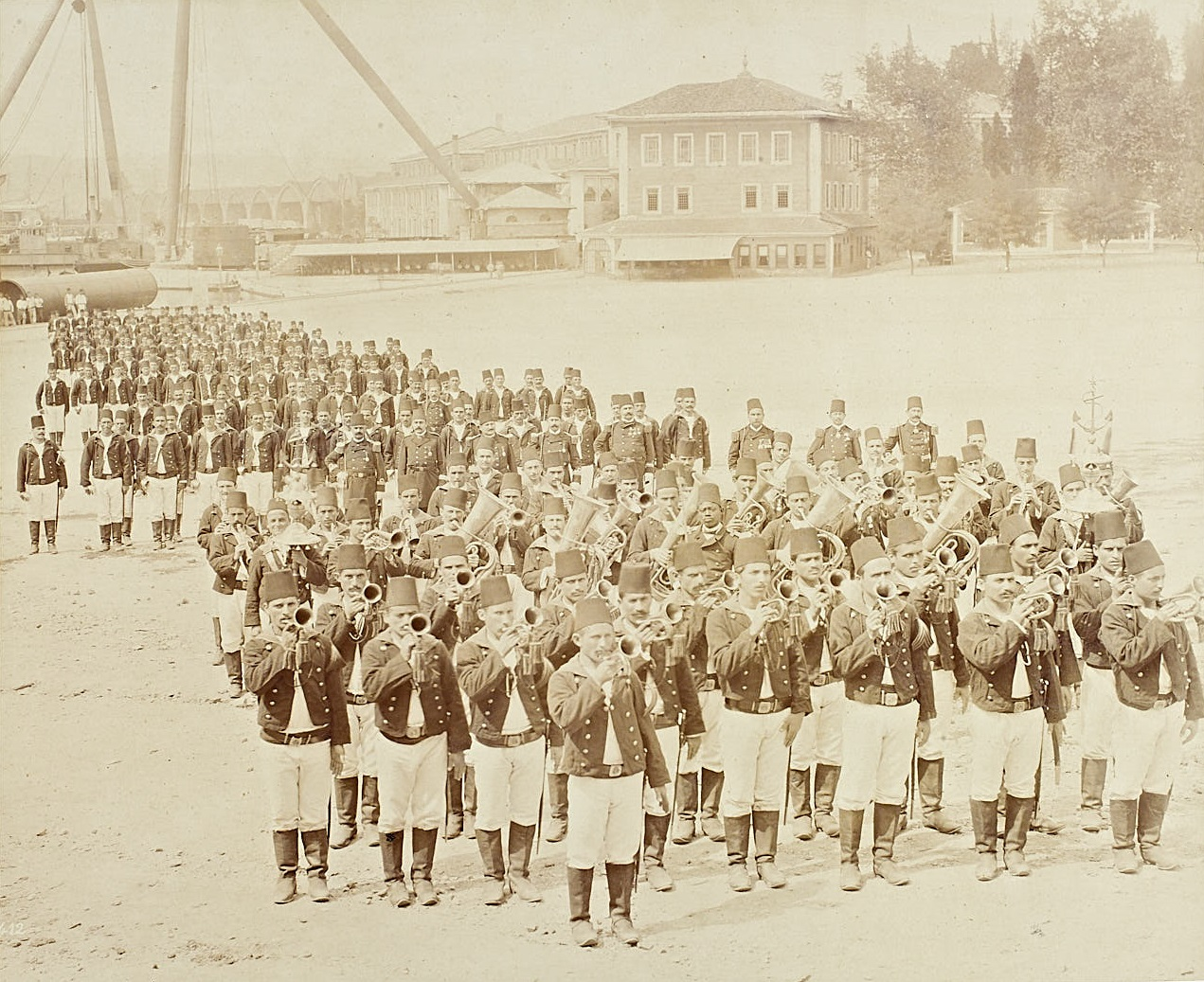
Crew of Orhaniye in the 1890s

She was again refitted at the Imperial Arsenal from 1892 to 1894. The nature of the refit is unclear; according to Bernd Langensiepen and Ahmet Güleryüz, the alterations were extensive. They state that she received two vertical triple-expansion engines in place of her original machinery, and six coal-fired Scotch marine boilers replaced the box boilers; the new propulsion system allowed her to steam at a speed of 10 knots (19 km/h; 12 mph). Her armament was radically revised; all of the old muzzle-loaders were removed and a battery of new Krupp breech-loading guns were installed. Two Krupp 240 mm (9.4 in) K L/35 guns were added in individual barbettes, one forward and one aft. Eight 150 mm (5.9 in) L/25 Krupp guns and six 105 mm (4.1 in) L/25 Krupp guns were installed on the broadside. Two of the 47 mm guns were removed and three more Nordenfelt guns were added. But Ian Sturton reports less significant alterations, noting that half of the original main battery guns were removed and six sponsons for light guns were added to the upper deck, three per side. He notes that the reconstruction described by Langensiepen and Güleryüz was only definitively carried out to Osmaniye and Aziziye and provides a photograph dated 1898 showing Orhaniye in the configuration he describes, stating, "this 1898 image...shows fewer alterations than in [Osmaniye and Aziziye]."

With the outbreak of the Greco-Turkish War in February 1897, Orhaniye was mobilized into the 1st Squadron. The Ottomans inspected the fleet and found that almost all of the vessels, including Orhaniye, to be completely unfit for combat against the Greek Navy, which possessed the three modern Hydra-class ironclads. Despite the fact that Orhaniye and her sisters had been refit just three years previously, the inspectors discovered that many of the pistons on their Krupp guns were bent, rendering the guns useless. Through April and May, the Ottoman fleet made several sorties into the Aegean Sea in an attempt to raise morale among the ships' crews, though the Ottomans had no intention of attacking Greek forces. With no possibility left to use the fleet in an active way, the Navy withdrew Orhaniye from service and removed her guns at Çanakkale.

The condition of the Ottoman fleet could not be concealed from foreign observers, particularly the British Admiral Henry Wood and the German Admiral Eugen Kalau vom Hofe, who led the inspection. The fleet proved to be an embarrassment for the government and finally forced Sultan Abdul Hamid II to authorize a modernization program, which recommended that the ironclads be modernized in foreign shipyards. German firms, including Krupp, Schichau-Werke, and AG Vulcan, were to rebuild the ships, but after having surveyed the ships, withdrew from the project in December 1897 owing to the impracticality of modernizing the ships and the inability of the Ottoman government to pay for the work due to its weak finances. Following a lengthy process of negotiations, Krupp received the contract to rebuild Orhaniye on 11 August 1900, along with several other warships. By December 1902, however, Krupp withdrew from the deal, and Orhaniye was ultimately not reconstructed. In 1908, she was towed to Constantinople and decommissioned there on 31 July 1909. She served briefly as a barracks ship in Kasımpaşa until 1913, when she was broken up.

== Legacy ==
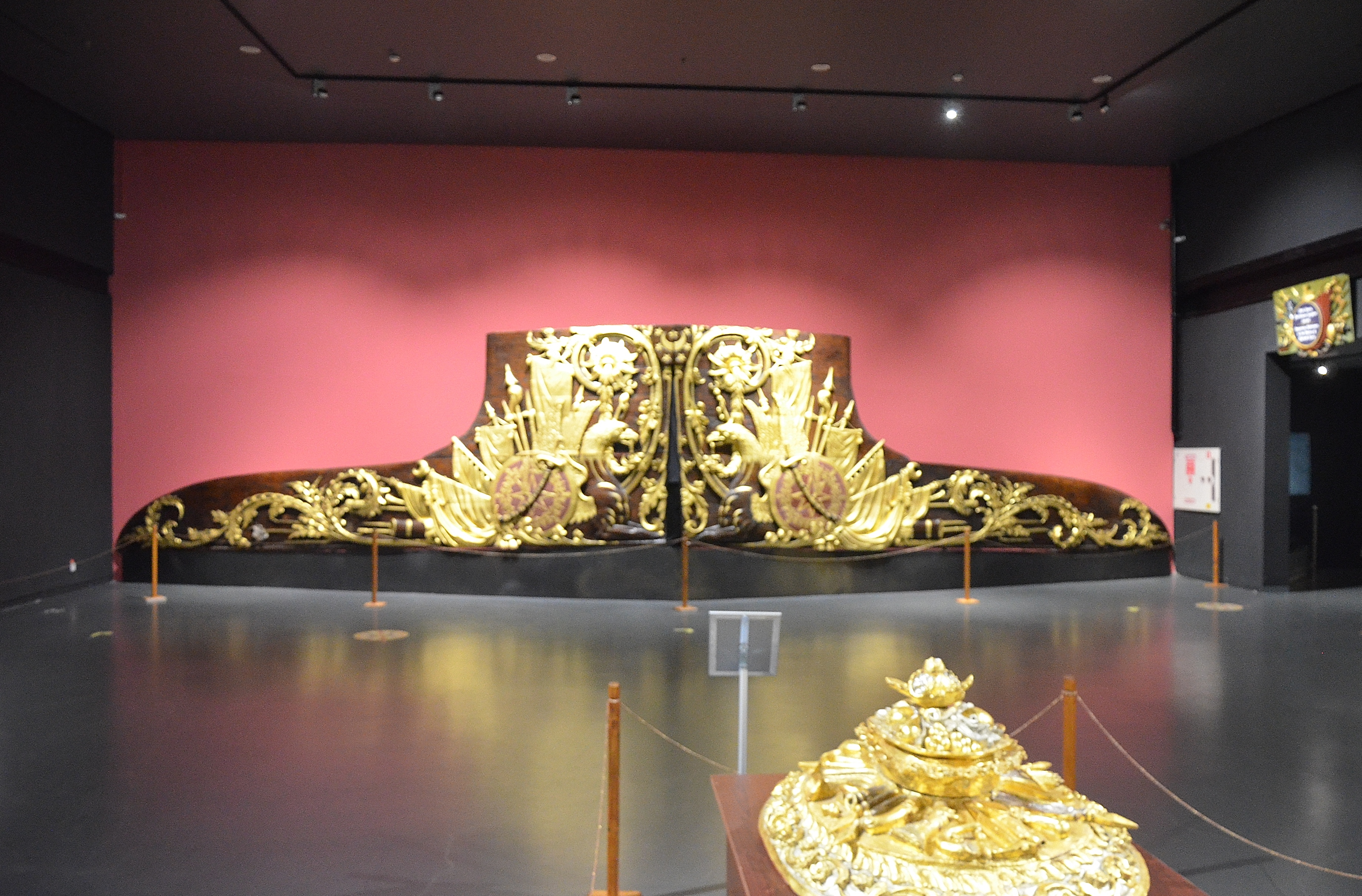
Coat of arms at the Istanbul Naval Museum

Her wooden coat of arms is preserved at the Istanbul Naval Museum.
