= Osmaniye-class ironclad =

Ironclad warship class of the Ottoman Navy

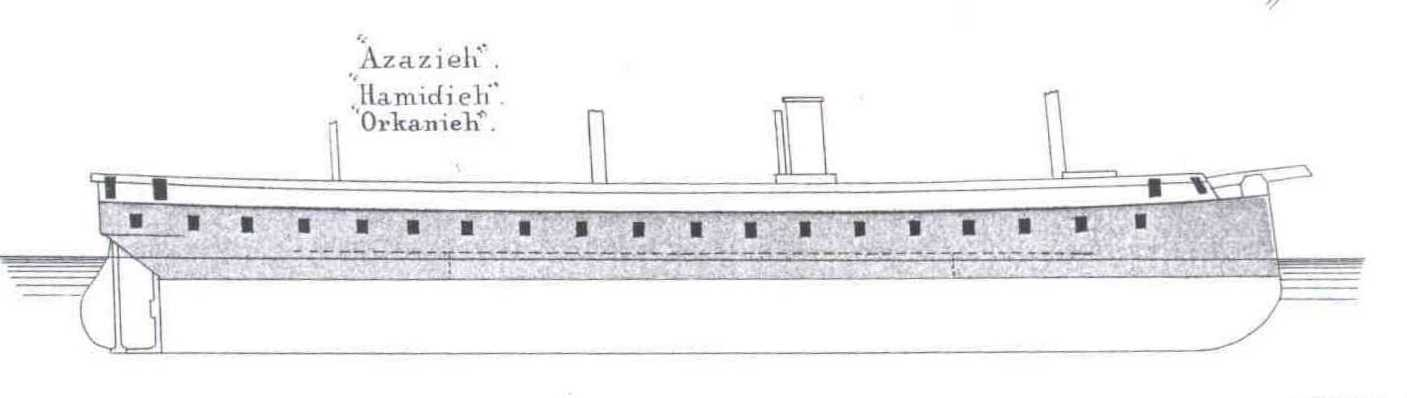
- Line-drawing of the Osmaniye class

Class overview
- Builders: Robert Napier and Sons (3); Thames Ironworks (1)
- Operators: Ottoman Empire
- Preceded by: None
- Succeeded by: Asar-i Tevfik
- Built: 1863–1866
- In commission: 1865–1909
- Completed: 4
- Scrapped: 4

General characteristics
- Type: Ironclad frigate
- Displacement: 6,400 metric tons (6,300 long tons; 7,100 short tons)
- Length: 91.4 m (299 ft 10 in) (loa)
- Beam: 16.9 m (55 ft 5 in)
- Draft: 7.9 m (25 ft 11 in)
- Installed power: 6 × box boilers
- Propulsion: 1 × compound steam engine; 1 × screw propeller
- Speed: 13.5 knots (25.0 km/h; 15.5 mph)
- Complement: 26 officers; 335 enlisted men
- Armament: 1 × 229 mm (9 in) RML Armstrong gun; 14 × 203 mm (8 in) RML Armstrong guns; 10 × 36-pounder Armstrong guns
- Armor: Belt: 140 mm (5.5 in); Battery: 127 mm (5 in)

The Osmaniye class was a group of four ironclad warships built for the Ottoman Navy in the 1860s. The class comprised Osmaniye, the lead ship, Aziziye, Orhaniye, and Mahmudiye. They were the first vessels of the type to be built for the Ottoman Empire; all four were built in Great Britain, the first three by Robert Napier and Sons and the fourth by Thames Iron Works. The ships were broadside ironclads, carrying a battery of fourteen 203 mm (8 in) Armstrong guns and ten 36-pounder Armstrong guns in a bank of guns on each broadside.

The ships saw little active service, in part because they were considered too large and thus too valuable to risk during the Russo-Turkish War of 1877–1878. The Ottoman fleet was placed in reserve for the following two decades, during which the four ships of the Osmaniye class were heavily rebuilt into more modern barbette ships. They were in poor condition by the outbreak of the Greco-Turkish War in 1897, like much of the rest of the fleet, and as a result saw no action during the war. The Navy considered rebuilding the ships for the second time in the early 1900s, but abandoned the idea due to their deteriorated state. As a result, the four ships were decommissioned in 1909 and Mahmudiye and Orhaniye were broken up in 1913, with Osmaniye and Aziziye remaining in the Navy's inventory until 1923, when they too were scrapped.

== Design ==
In 1861, Abdülaziz became sultan of the Ottoman Empire, and thereafter began a construction program to strengthen the Ottoman Navy, which had incurred heavy losses during the Crimean War of 1853–1856. The Navy ordered ironclad warships from shipyards in Britain and France, though the program was limited by the Ottoman Empire's limited finances. The Osmaniye class were the first ironclads to be ordered as part of the program.

=== Characteristics ===
The Osmaniye-class ships were 91.4 m (299 ft 10 in) long overall, with a beam of 16.9 m (55 ft 5 in) and a draft of 7.9 m (25 ft 11 in). Their hulls were constructed with iron, incorporated a ram bow, and displaced 6,400 metric tons (6,300 long tons; 7,100 short tons) normally and 4,211 t (4,144 long tons; 4,642 short tons) BOM. They had a crew of 26 officers and 335 enlisted men as completed, but only 250 after 1894.

The shading represents areas of the hull covered by armor

The ships were powered by a single horizontal compound steam engine which drove one screw propeller. Steam was provided by six coal-fired box boilers that were trunked into a single, retractable funnel amidships. Their engine produced a top speed of 13.5 knots (25.0 km/h; 15.5 mph) on sea trials, though by 1891, decades of poor maintenance had reduced the ships' speed to 6 knots (11 km/h; 6.9 mph). Osmaniye and her sister ships carried 750 t (740 long tons; 830 short tons) of coal. A supplementary barque rig with three masts was also fitted.

The ships were armed with a battery of one 229 mm (9 in) rifled muzzle-loading (RML) Armstrong gun and fourteen 203 mm (8 in) RML Armstrongs. These were supplemented with ten 36-pounder guns, also manufactured by Armstrong. The 229 mm gun was placed on the upper deck, forward, and the rest of the guns were mounted on each broadside on the upper and main decks.

The ships' wrought iron armored belt was 140 mm (5.5 in) thick, and was capped with 76 mm (3 in) thick transverse bulkhead at either end. The belt extended from 1 m (2 ft 6 in) above the waterline and 2 m (6 ft) below amidships, with the depth of the belt reduced to 1 m (4 ft 6 in) at either end of the ship. Above the belt were strakes of armor 127 mm (5 in) thick that protected the battery, transverse bulkheads 114 mm (4.5 in) connected the battery armor. The 229 mm gun in the bow was protected by a breastwork that was sheathed with 102 mm (4 in) of iron plate.

=== Modifications ===
In 1884, the 36-pounder guns were removed and a light battery of four 47 mm (1.9 in) quick-firing (QF) Hotchkiss guns and two 4-barreled 25.4 mm (1 in) Nordenfelt guns were added.

All four ships were refitted at the Imperial Arsenal, with work lasting from 1890 to 1894. During the refit, they received two vertical triple-expansion engines in place of their original machinery, and six coal-fired Scotch marine boilers replaced the box boilers; the new propulsion system allowed them to steam at a speed of 10 knots (19 km/h; 12 mph). Their armament was radically revised; all of the old muzzle-loaders were removed and a battery of new Krupp breech-loading guns were installed. Two Krupp 240 mm (9.4 in) K L/35 guns were added in individual barbettes, one forward and one aft. Eight 150 mm (5.9 in) L/25 Krupp guns and six 105 mm (4.1 in) L/25 Krupp guns were installed on the broadside. Two of the 47 mm guns were removed and three more Nordenfelt guns were added.

== Ships ==
Ship	Builder	Laid down	Launched	Completed
Osmaniye	Robert Napier and Sons	1863	2 September 1864	November 1865
Aziziye	Robert Napier and Sons	1863	January 1865	August 1865
Orhaniye	Robert Napier and Sons	1863	26 June 1865	1866
Mahmudiye	Thames Iron Works	1863	13 December 1864	1866

== Service history ==
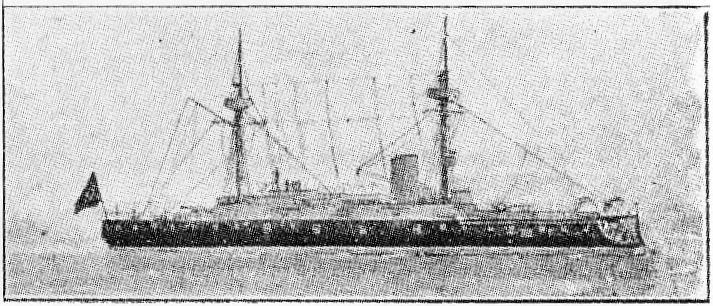
Osmaniye after her reconstruction

Unlike most of the other ironclads of the Ottoman fleet, the four Osmaniye-class ships were kept out of action during the Russo-Turkish War of 1877–1878, since they were among the largest and most powerful vessels of the fleet and the high command decided they ought to be preserved. As a result, they generally remained safely in the Sea of Marmara, though Osmaniye was briefly used as a troop transport in the Mediterranean Sea. The four ships were reduced to reserve status in Constantinople after the war, with the rest of the Ottoman fleet. The four ships were heavily rebuilt in the early 1890s, being converted into more modern barbette ships. Nevertheless, they were in poor condition by the outbreak of the Greco-Turkish War in February 1897, with many of their guns damaged or incomplete. Training exercises conducted in May highlighted the very low standard of training of their crews, and reinforced the decision not to confront the Greek Navy at sea.

All four ships were disarmed after the war and laid up. The Ottomans began a reconstruction program, which was to have included the four Osmaniye-class ships. The proposed alterations included a new propulsion system and a battery consisting of one 203 mm quick-firing gun and nine 150 mm QF guns. They were also to receive a new suite of steel armor, including a 254 mm (10 in) thick belt, 127 mm thick barbettes, 76 mm gun turrets, and a 38 mm (1.5 in) thick deck. But the ships were found to be not worth rebuilding a second time, and so all were ultimately decommissioned in 1909. Aziziye, Orhaniye, and Mahmudiye were briefly used as barracks ships; the latter two were sold for scrap in 1913, and Aziziye and Osmaniye followed them to the ship breakers in 1923.
