= Ottoman ironclad Aziziye =

Ironclad warship of the Ottoman Navy

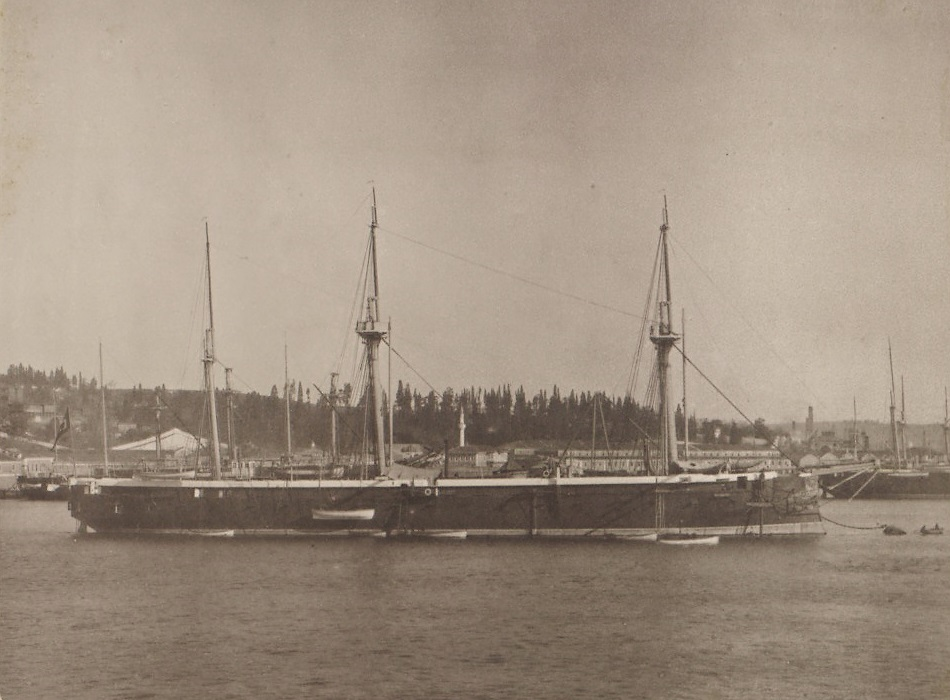
- Aziziye in Golden Horn

History

Ottoman Empire
- Name: Aziziye
- Namesake: Abdülaziz
- Builder: Robert Napier and Sons
- Laid down: 1863
- Launched: January 1865
- Commissioned: August 1865
- Decommissioned: 31 July 1909
- Fate: Broken up, 1923

General characteristics
- Class & type: Osmaniye class
- Displacement: 6,400 metric tons (6,300 long tons; 7,100 short tons)
- Length: 91.4 m (299 ft 10 in) (loa)
- Beam: 16.9 m (55 ft 5 in)
- Draft: 7.9 m (25 ft 11 in)
- Installed power: 6 × box boilers
- Propulsion: 1 × compound steam engine; 1 × screw propeller
- Speed: 13.5 knots (25.0 km/h; 15.5 mph)
- Complement: 26 officers; 335 enlisted men
- Armament: 1 × 229 mm (9 in) rifled muzzle loader (RML) Armstrong gun; 14 × 203 mm (8 in) RML Armstrong guns; 10 × 36-pounder Armstrong guns
- Armor: Belt: 140 mm (5.5 in); Battery: 127 mm (5 in)

Aziziye, named for Sultan Abdülaziz, was the second of four Osmaniye-class ironclads built for the Ottoman Navy in the 1860s. The ship was laid down at the Robert Napier and Sons shipyard in 1863, was launched in January 1865 and was commissioned in August that year. A broadside ironclad, Aziziye carried a battery of fourteen 203 mm (8 in) rifled muzzle loader (RML) Armstrong guns and ten 36-pounder Armstrongs in a traditional broadside arrangement, with a single 229 mm (9 in) RML as a chase gun. Among the more powerful of Ottoman ironclads, the Navy decided to keep the ship safely in the Mediterranean Sea during the Russo-Turkish War of 1877–1878 to preserve the vessel. She spent the 1880s out of service, though she was heavily rebuilt in the early 1890s and converted into a more modern barbette ship. She was nevertheless in poor condition by the time of the Greco-Turkish War in 1897, as a result saw no action, and was disarmed after the war. She saw no further active service, being used briefly as a barracks ship from 1904 to 1909. In 1923, she was sold to ship breakers and dismantled.

== Design ==
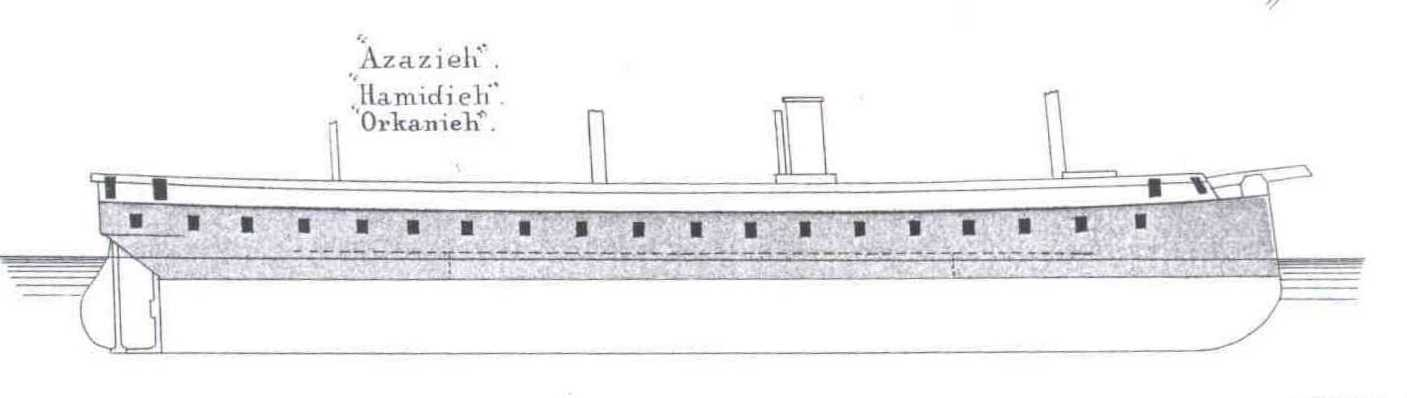
Profile drawing of the Osmaniye class

Aziziye was 91.4 m (299 ft 10 in) long overall, with a beam of 16.9 m (55 ft 5 in) and a draft of 7.9 m (25 ft 11 in). The hull was constructed with iron, incorporated a ram bow, and displaced 6,400 metric tons (6,300 long tons; 7,100 short tons) normally and 4,211 t (4,144 long tons; 4,642 short tons) BOM. She had a crew of 26 officers and 335 enlisted men as completed, but only 250 after 1894.

The ship was powered by a single horizontal compound steam engine which drove one screw propeller. Steam was provided by six coal-fired box boilers that were trunked into a single, retractable funnel amidships. The engine produced a top speed of 13.5 knots (25.0 km/h; 15.5 mph) on sea trials, though by 1891, decades of poor maintenance had reduced the ship's speed to 6 knots (11 km/h; 6.9 mph). Aziziye carried 750 t (740 long tons; 830 short tons) of coal. A supplementary barque rig with three masts was also fitted.

The ship was armed with a battery of one 229 mm (9 in) rifled muzzle-loading (RML) Armstrong gun and fourteen 203 mm (8 in) RML Armstrongs. These were supplemented with ten 36-pounder guns, which were also manufactured by Armstrong. The 229 mm gun was placed on the upper deck, forward, and the rest of the guns were mounted on each broadside. The ship's wrought iron armored belt was 140 mm (5.5 in) thick, and was capped with 76 mm (3 in) thick transverse bulkhead at either end. Above the belt were strakes of armor 127 mm (5 in) thick that protected the battery, transverse bulkheads 114 mm (4.5 in) connected the battery armor.

== Service history ==
=== Construction and early career ===
Aziziye was ordered in 1862, originally under the name Abdül Aziz to commemorate Sultan Abdülaziz. She was laid down at the Robert Napier and Sons shipyard in Glasgow in May 1863. She was launched in January 1865 under her original name, but by the time she was commissioned into the fleet in August that year, she had been renamed Aziziye, another reference to the sultan. Early in the ship's career, the Ottoman ironclad fleet was activated every summer for short cruises from the Golden Horn to the Bosporus to ensure their propulsion systems were in operable condition.

The Ottoman fleet began mobilizing in September 1876 to prepare for a conflict with Russia, as tensions with the country had been growing for several years, an insurrection had begun in Ottoman Bosnia in mid-1875, and Serbia had declared war on the Ottoman Empire in July 1876. At the start of 1877, the ship was assigned to the 2nd Division of the Mediterranean Fleet, based in Crete, along with the ironclads Mukaddeme-i Hayir and Iclaliye. The Russo-Turkish War began on 24 April 1877 with a Russian declaration of war, but unlike many of the other, smaller Ottoman ironclads, Aziziye and her sister ships remained in the Mediterranean Fleet. The Navy feared losing the largest ships of its fleet, and so kept them primarily in port for the duration of the conflict. The wooden warships of the Mediterranean Fleet sortied in April 1877 to patrol the coast of Albania, but Aziziye and the rest of the ironclads remained in Souda Bay.

=== 1880s–1890s: inactivity and reconstruction ===
After the conclusion of the war in 1878, Aziziye was laid up in Constantinople. The annual summer cruises to the Bosporus ended. By the mid-1880s, the Ottoman ironclad fleet was in poor condition, and Aziziye was unable to go to sea. Many of the ships' engines were unusable, having seized up from rust, and their hulls were badly fouled. The British naval attache to the Ottoman Empire at the time estimated that the Imperial Arsenal would take six months to get just five of the ironclads ready to go to sea. During this period, the ship's crew was limited to about one-third the normal figure.

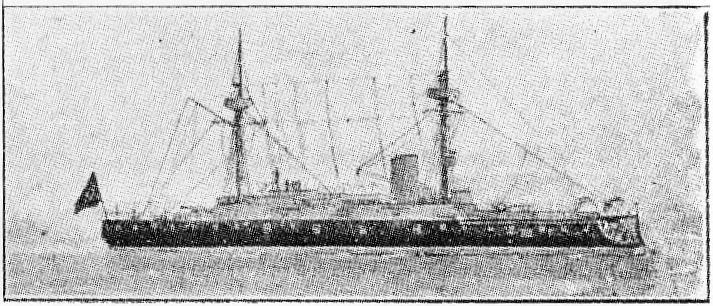
Osmaniye after her reconstruction; Aziziye appeared similarly

In 1884, the 36-pounder gun were removed and a light battery of four 47 mm (1.9 in) quick-firing (QF) Hotchkiss guns and two 4-barreled 25.4 mm (1 in) Nordenfelt guns were added. In 1885–1886, the navy conducted experiments with converting Krupp fortress guns for use aboard Aziziye. These were breech-loading old guns manufactured in the mid-1870s, and the navy attempted to use the gun carriages from the existing muzzle-loading guns or the fortress mountings the Krupp guns had used ashore. The navy first installed them aboard her sister ship Osmaniye before fitting the guns to Aziziye. During a period of tension with Greece in 1886, the fleet was brought to full crews and the ships were prepared to go to sea, but none actually left the Golden Horn, and they were quickly laid up again. By that time, most of the ships were capable of little more than 4 to 6 knots (7.4 to 11.1 km/h; 4.6 to 6.9 mph).

Aziziye was again refitted at the Imperial Arsenal from 1890 to 1894, the first vessel to receive these updates. The ship's main battery was strengthened by the installation of two Krupp 240 mm (9.4 in) K L/35 guns. The upper deck was cut down forward and aft, where these guns were installed in individual barbettes. The barbettes, which appeared to be standard, heavily armored mountings, actually consisted of about 250 mm (10 in) of wood and a thin 13 mm (0.5 in) plating. The guns themselves were fitted with 25 mm thick gun shields. Eight 150 mm (5.9 in) L/25 Krupp guns and six 105 mm (4.1 in) L/25 Krupp guns were installed on the broadside. The 150 mm guns took the place of the old Krupp guns in the gun battery, though half of the gun ports were plated over, while the 105 mm guns were installed in sponsons in the upper deck. Two of the 47 mm guns were removed and three more Nordenfelt guns were added. During the refit, she also received two vertical triple-expansion engines in place of her original machinery, and six coal-fired Scotch marine boilers replaced the box boilers; the new propulsion system allowed her to steam at a speed of 10 knots (19 km/h; 12 mph). She was again placed out of service in 1897 in Çanakkale.

=== Later career ===
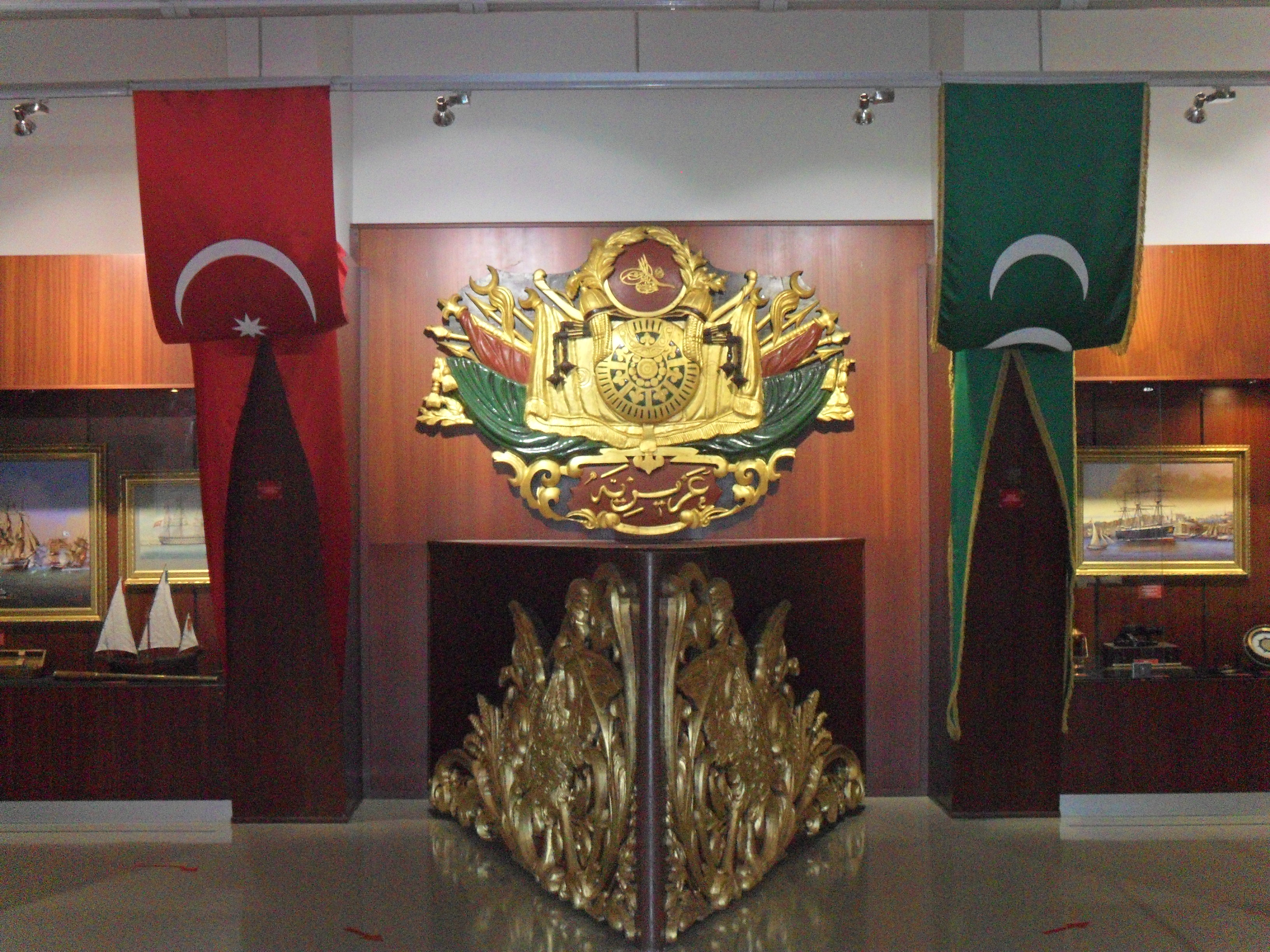
Aft decoration of Aziziye, Mersin Naval Museum

With the outbreak of the Greco-Turkish War in February 1897, Aziziye was mobilized into the 1st Squadron. On 19 March, Aziziye and the ironclads Mesudiye, Hamidiye, and Necm-i Şevket and three torpedo boats departed the Golden Horn, bound for the Dardanelles. The squadron stopped off Lapseki on 22 March, having lost two of the torpedo boats to unseaworthiness. The Ottomans inspected the fleet and found that almost all of the vessels, including Aziziye, to be completely unfit for combat against the Greek Navy, which possessed the three modern Hydra-class ironclads. Despite the fact that Aziziye and her sisters had been refit just three years previously, the inspectors discovered that many of the pistons on their Krupp guns were bent, rendering the guns useless. Worse, the breeches for Aziziye's 240 mm guns were left at the Imperial Arsenal.

Through April and May, the Ottoman fleet made several sorties into the Aegean Sea in an attempt to raise morale among the ships' crews, though the Ottomans had no intention of attacking Greek forces. During this period, she, Necm-i Şevket, and the river monitor Hizber escorted troop transports from western Anatolia to Gelibolu, though their presence was simply for show. While on this duty, the ships conducted gunnery training outside the Bosporus. On 15 May, Aziziye and the ironclads Mesudiye, Necm-i Şevket, Osmaniye, and Hamidiye, along with several other vessels conducted a major training exercise, where severe deficiencies in the level of training were revealed, particularly with the men's ability to operate the ships' guns.

The condition of the Ottoman fleet could not be concealed from foreign observers, particularly the British Admiral Henry Wood and the German Admiral Eugen Kalau vom Hofe, who led the inspection. The fleet proved to be an embarrassment for the government and finally forced Sultan Abdul Hamid II to authorize a modernization program, which recommended that the ironclads be modernized in foreign shipyards. German firms, including Krupp, Schichau-Werke, and AG Vulcan, were to rebuild the ships, but after having surveyed the ships, withdrew from the project in December 1897 owing to the impracticality of modernizing the ships and the inability of the Ottoman government to pay for the work due to its weak finances. Following a lengthy process of negotiations, Krupp received the contract to rebuild Aziziye on 11 August 1900, along with several other warships. By December 1902, however, Krupp withdrew from the deal, and Aziziye was ultimately not reconstructed. She became a barracks ship in 1904, based in Kasımpaşa. On 31 July 1909, she was decommissioned, but remained in the Navy's inventory until 1923 when she was broken up.
