= Armstrong Township =

Armstrong Township may refer to several places in the United States:

- Armstrong Township, Vanderburgh County, Indiana
- Armstrong Township, Indiana County, Pennsylvania
- Armstrong Township, Lycoming County, Pennsylvania

== See also ==
- Armstrong (disambiguation)
