= Armstrong Telephone Company =

American telecommunications provider

- Company type: Privately held
- Industry: Telecommunications
- Founded: 1946
- Headquarters: Butler, Pennsylvania, United States
- Products: Landline Telephone Service
- Website: armstrongonewire.com

Armstrong Telephone Company is a telecommunications provider, and part of the Armstrong Group of Companies. The company primarily operates as a local exchange carrier in rural markets in West Virginia, Maryland, Pennsylvania, New York and Ohio.

The following Armstrong companies are registered with the FCC : Armstrong Digital Services, Inc., Armstrong Telephone Company – New York, Armstrong Telephone Company – Pennsylvania, Armstrong Telephone Co. – North, Armstrong Telephone Company – Maryland, Armstrong Telecommunications, Inc., Armstrong Telephone Company – Northern Division, and Armstrong Telephone Company – West Virginia.
