= Armstrong Lake (Blue Earth County, Minnesota) =

Lake in the state of Minnesota, United States

- Location within Minnesota
- Location: Blue Earth County, Minnesota
- Coordinates: 44°9′11″N 94°20′41″W
- Type: Lake
- Surface elevation: 984 feet (300 m)

Armstrong Lake is a lake in Blue Earth County, Minnesota, in the United States.

Armstrong Lake was named for John Armstrong, an early settler.
