= Armstrong Township, Pennsylvania =

Armstrong Township is the name of some places in the U.S. state of Pennsylvania:

- Armstrong Township, Indiana County, Pennsylvania
- Armstrong Township, Lycoming County, Pennsylvania
