= Armstrong Audio =

Armstrong Audio Ltd.
- Type: Private
- Industry: Audio equipment
- Founded: 1932; 94 years ago
- Founder: Claude Charles Jackson
- Headquarters: London, England
- Products: Stereo amplifiers, radio

Armstrong Audio Ltd., originally called Armstrong Wireless and Television Ltd., was a British manufacturer of radios and other audio equipment based in London, England. Founded by Claude Charles Jackson in 1932.

== History ==
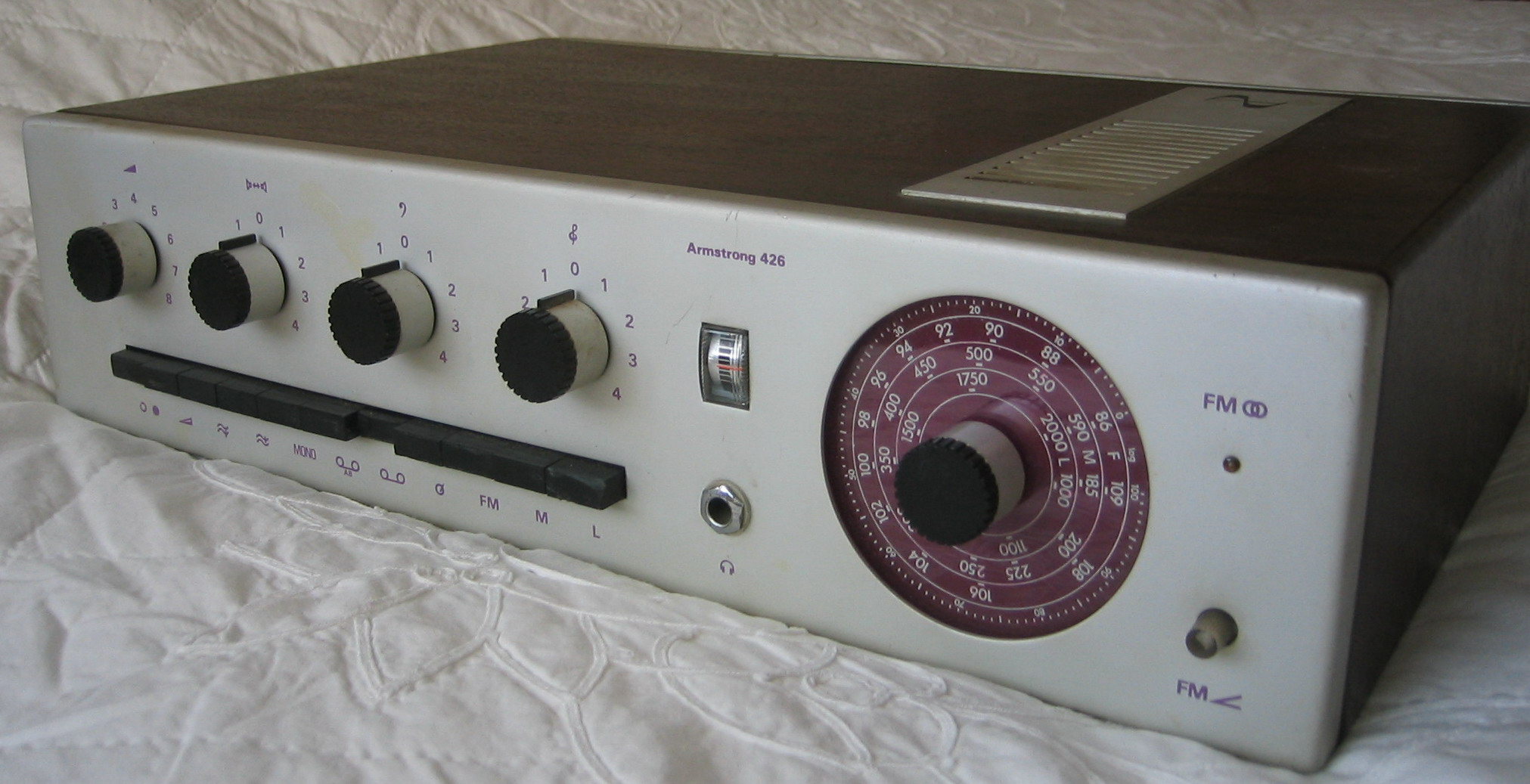
Armstrong 426 combined amplifier and tuner from the mid-1960s

Initially created to manufacture portable radios, during World War II their factory was used to manufacture radios, public address systems, and various electronic parts. After the war, they began to produce television sets, as well as long range radios for ships, but eventually ceased production of those lines to manufacture radios, amplifiers and tuners for home consumer use. In the 1950s when the high fidelity market began to take shape, the company name was changed to Armstrong Audio and they focused their marketing and manufacturing at becoming hi-fi specialists.

During the 1960s and 1970s they were extremely successful, creating several durable radio models which are still in use by consumers today, but by the end of the 1970s their lease on their factory ran out and it was decided not to invest in a new one. The building was torn down and the owners redeveloped it. Using plans developed for a further radio model, some of the staff continued on as Armstrong Amplifiers, but due to a lack of capital and suitable manufacturing space, production did not last long.

Today, what once was Armstrong Audio is now called Armstrong Hi-Fi and Video Services and is based in Walthamstow, and they provide maintenance contract to a number of retail stores.

== Armstrong 521 ==
The Armstrong 521 was a stereo hi-fi amplifier from the Armstrong Audio company and was marketed as 2 x 25W amplifier.

It employed germanium AL102 transistors in its output stages and these had a reputation for failure and are now unobtainable although it is possible, with modification to replace these with newer, silicon transistors. The amplifier was a single rail design and employed an electrolytic output capacitor in the output stage. The amplifier featured inputs for tape, tuner and MM gramophone and on the front panel had 4 rotary controls for volume, bass, treble and balance. Underneath these controls were a series of black push buttons which allowed control of the input sources as well as loudness, high pass filters, rumble filters and tape bypass. The amplifier was presented with an aluminium, silk-screened front panel with a teak case and a matte black rear panel. The amplifiers were marketed from the 1968–1972 when it was replaced by 600 series.

== Product reviews ==
PCU25 Preamp/Control Unit + A20 Valve Power Amp

- Gramophone, rev. by Philip G. Tandy, April 1962
- Hi Fi News, rev. by George W. Tillett, April 1962
- Amateur Tape Recording, rev. by Fred Judd, May 1962
- Audio and Record Review, September 1962

400 Range

- Hi Fi News, 426 Receiver (Amp + AM/FM tuners) rev., by George Goodall, October 1968

500 Range amplifier

- Hi Fi Sound, review of 521 Amplifier, by Fred Judd, April 1969
- Audio and Record Review, review of 521 Amplifier, by Frank Roberts & Donald Aldous, 1969
- Luister [Dutch], review of 521 Amplifier by Jan Kool, 1969
- Which, Large comparison review including the 521 Amplifier, April 1970
- Hi Fi Sound, review of 526, by Fred Judd, May 1970
- Hi Fi Sound, 526 included in comparison of 10 tuner-amps, by Fred Judd, October 1920

600 Range amplifier

- Audio, 626 Receiver (Amp + AM/FM tuners) rev., by Fred Judd, May 1973
- Hi Fi News, 626 Receiver (Amp + AM/FM tuners) rev., by Fred Judd, October 1973
- Hi Fi Answers, 626 Receiver (Amp + AM/FM tuners) review., December 1974
- Luister [Dutch], 621 Amplifier rev., by Jan Kool, November 1973
- Hi Fi choice, Receivers 626 Review, by Angus McKenzie, 1976 Issue 2
- Hi Fi choice, Amplifiers 621 Review, by Hugh Ford, 1976 Issue 6
- Hi Fi choice, Receivers 626 Review, by Angus McKenzie, 1977 Issue 7
- Audio (USA), 625 Receiver (Amp + FM tuner) rev. by Leonard Feldman, March 1978
- Practical HiFi, 602 Speakers as part of a 'system' rev., by Philip Mount, March 1978

700 Range

- Hi Fi News, 730/732 Amplifier rev. by Martin Colloms, July 1982
- Popular HiFi 730/732 Amplifier rev. by Noel Keywood & Chris Thomas, September 1982
- Hi Fi News, postscript to July review, September 1982
