= Ottoman ironclad Osmaniye =

Ironclad warship of the Ottoman Navy

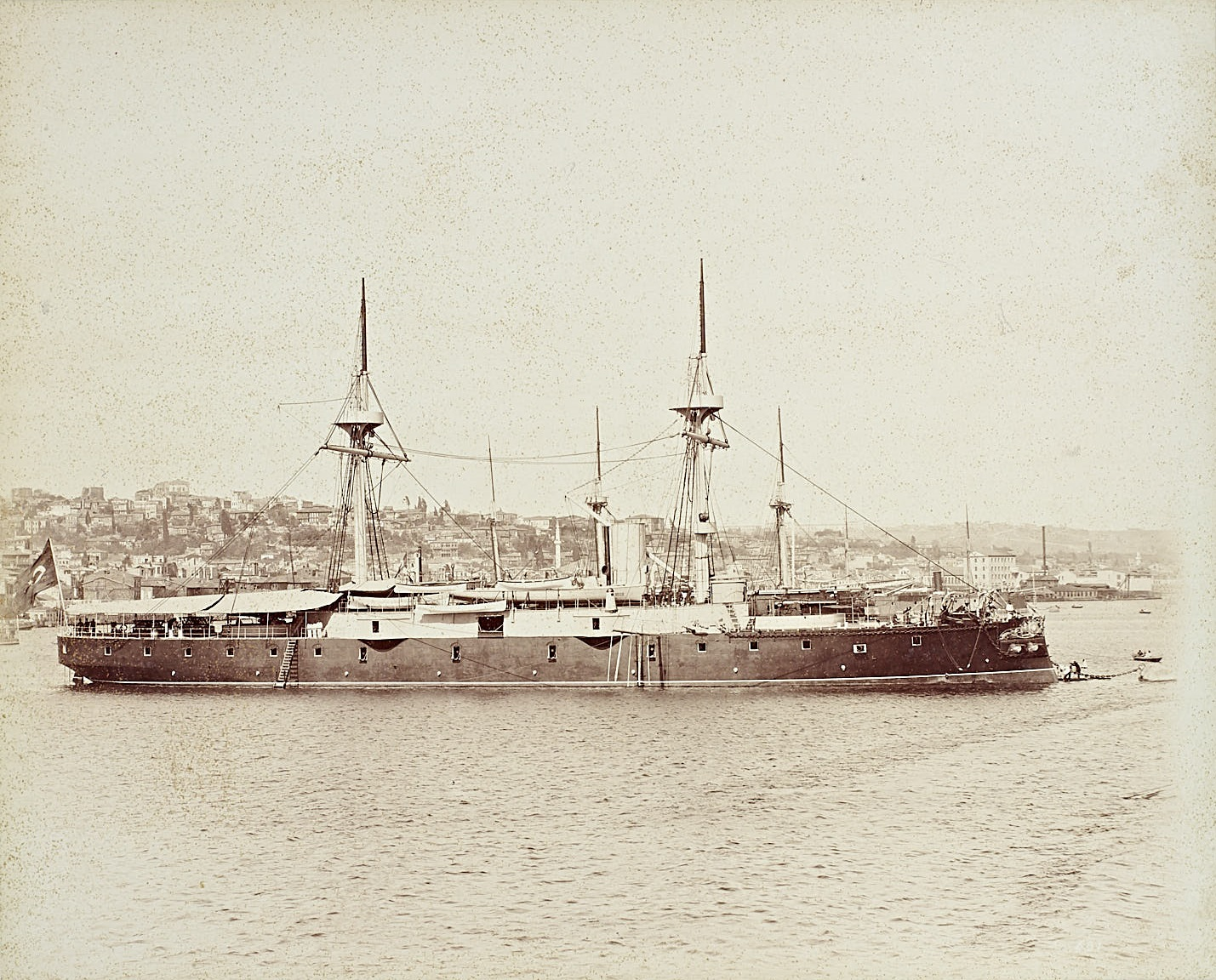
- Osmaniye in Istanbul

History

Ottoman Empire
- Name: Osmaniye
- Namesake: Osman I
- Builder: Robert Napier and Sons
- Laid down: 1863
- Launched: 2 September 1864
- Commissioned: November 1865
- Decommissioned: 31 July 1909
- Fate: Broken up, 1923

General characteristics
- Class & type: Osmaniye class
- Displacement: 6,400 metric tons (6,300 long tons; 7,100 short tons)
- Length: 91.4 m (299 ft 10 in) (loa)
- Beam: 16.9 m (55 ft 5 in)
- Draft: 7.9 m (25 ft 11 in)
- Installed power: 6 × box boilers
- Propulsion: 1 × compound steam engine; 1 × screw propeller
- Speed: 13.5 knots (25.0 km/h; 15.5 mph)
- Complement: 26 officers; 335 enlisted men
- Armament: 1 × 229 mm (9 in) RML Armstrong gun; 14 × 203 mm (8 in) RML Armstrong guns; 10 × 36-pounder Armstrong guns
- Armor: Belt: 140 mm (5.5 in); Battery: 127 mm (5 in)

Osmaniye, named for Sultan Osman I, was the lead ship of the Osmaniye class of ironclad warships built for the Ottoman Navy in the 1860s by Robert Napier and Sons of the United Kingdom. A broadside ironclad, Osmaniye carried a battery of fourteen 203 mm (8 in) RML Armstrong guns and ten 36-pounder Armstrongs in a traditional broadside arrangement, with a single 229 mm (9 in) RML as a chase gun. Among the more powerful of Ottoman ironclads, the Navy decided to keep the ship out of the action during the Russo-Turkish War of 1877–1878 to preserve the vessel. She spent the 1880s out of service, though she was heavily rebuilt in the early 1890s and converted into a more modern barbette ship. She was nevertheless in poor condition by the time of the Greco-Turkish War in 1897, as a result saw no action, and was disarmed after the war. She remained in commission until 1909 but saw no further service, and was broken up in 1923.

== Design ==
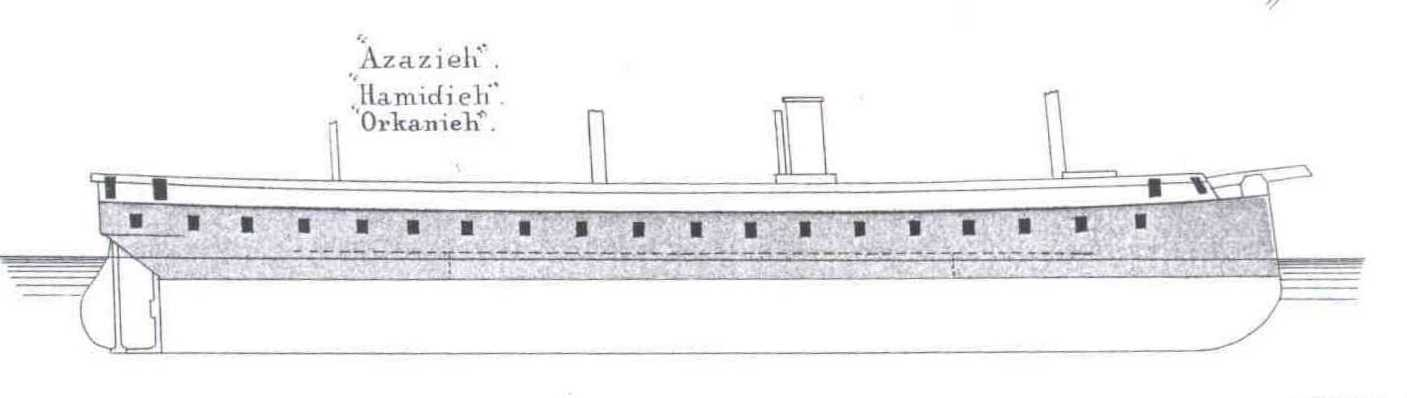
Profile drawing of the Osmaniye class

Osmaniye was 91.4 m (299 ft 10 in) long overall, with a beam of 16.9 m (55 ft 5 in) and a draft of 7.9 m (25 ft 11 in). The hull was constructed with iron, incorporated a ram bow, and displaced 6,400 metric tons (6,300 long tons; 7,100 short tons) normally and 4,211 t (4,144 long tons; 4,642 short tons) BOM. She had a crew of 26 officers and 335 enlisted men as completed, but only 250 after 1894.

The ship was powered by a single horizontal compound steam engine which drove one screw propeller. Steam was provided by six coal-fired box boilers that were trunked into a single, retractable funnel amidships. The engine produced a top speed of 13.5 knots (25.0 km/h; 15.5 mph) on sea trials, though by 1891, decades of poor maintenance had reduced the ship's speed to 6 knots (11 km/h; 6.9 mph). Osmaniye carried 750 t (740 long tons; 830 short tons) of coal. A supplementary barque rig with three masts was also fitted.

The ship was armed with a battery of one 229 mm (9 in) rifled muzzle-loading (RML) Armstrong gun and fourteen 203 mm (8 in) RML Armstrongs. These were supplemented with ten 36-pounder guns, also manufactured by Armstrong. The 229 mm gun was placed on the upper deck, forward, and the rest of the guns were mounted on each broadside. The ship's wrought iron armored belt was 140 mm (5.5 in) thick, and was capped with 76 mm (3 in) thick transverse bulkhead at either end. Above the belt were strakes of armor 127 mm (5 in) thick that protected the battery, transverse bulkheads 114 mm (4.5 in) connected the battery armor.

== Service history ==
=== Construction and early career ===
Osmaniye was ordered from the Robert Napier and Sons shipyard in Glasgow in 1862. Her keel was laid down in March 1863 and she was launched on 2 September 1864, originally under the name Gazi Osman. She began sea trials on 27 June 1865, by which time she had been renamed Osmaniye for Sultan Osman I, and she was commissioned into the Ottoman fleet in November that year. Early in the ship's career, the Ottoman ironclad fleet was activated every summer for short cruises from the Golden Horn to the Bosporus to ensure their propulsion systems were in operable condition.

The Ottoman fleet began mobilizing in September 1876 to prepare for a conflict with Russia, as tensions with the country had been growing for several years, an insurrection had begun in Ottoman Bosnia in mid-1875, and Serbia had declared war on the Ottoman Empire in July 1876. The Russo-Turkish War began on 24 April 1877 with a Russian declaration of war, but unlike many of the other, smaller Ottoman ironclads, Osmaniye and her sister ships remained in the Mediterranean Fleet. The Navy feared losing the largest ships of its fleet, and so kept them primarily in port for the duration of the conflict. The wooden warships of the Mediterranean Fleet sortied in April 1877 to patrol the coast of Albania, but Osmaniye and the rest of the ironclads remained in Souda Bay. In January 1878, as Russian forces approached the Ottoman capital through the Balkans, several vessels began transporting a reserve army from Dedeagac to Gelibolu; Osmaniye and the royal yacht Sultaniye joined the operation and carried the last elements of the army on 31 January.

=== 1880s–1890s: inactivity and reconstruction ===
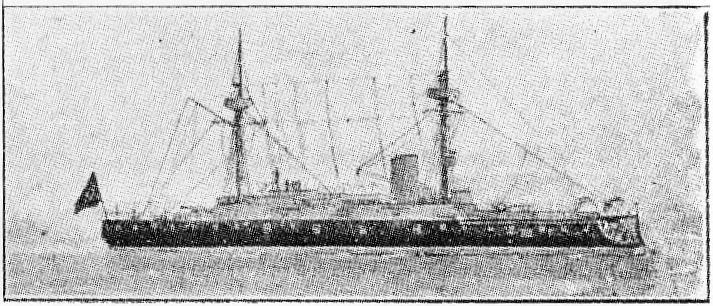
Osmaniye after her reconstruction

After the conclusion of the war in 1878, Osmaniye was laid up in Constantinople. The annual summer cruises to the Bosporus ended and the ships rarely left the Golden Horn. By 1883, the Ottoman ironclad fleet was in poor condition, and Osmaniye was unable to go to sea. Many of the ships' engines were unusable, having seized up from rust, and their hulls were badly fouled. The British naval attache to the Ottoman Empire at the time estimated that the Imperial Arsenal would take six months to get just five of the ironclads ready to go to sea. During this period, the ship's crew was limited to about one-third the normal figure.

In 1884, the 36-pounder guns were removed and a light battery of four 47 mm (1.9 in) quick-firing (QF) Hotchkiss guns and two 4-barreled 25.4 mm (1 in) Nordenfelt guns were added. In 1885–1886, the navy conducted experiments with converting Krupp breeck-loading fortress guns for use aboard Osmaniye. These were old guns manufactured in the mid-1870s, and the navy attempted to use the gun carriages from the existing muzzle-loading guns or the fortress mountings the Krupp guns had used ashore. After the work was completed in 1886, the ship briefly went to sea to test the guns, one of the only times the ship left the Golden Horn in the 1880s. During a period of tension with Greece in 1886, the fleet was brought to full crews and the ships were prepared to go to sea, but none actually left the Golden Horn, and they were quickly laid up again. By that time, most of the ships were capable of little more than 4 to 6 knots (7.4 to 11.1 km/h; 4.6 to 6.9 mph).

Osmaniye was again refitted at the Imperial Arsenal from 1890 to 1894, the first vessel to receive these updates. The ship's main battery was strengthened by the installation of two Krupp 240 mm (9.4 in) K L/35 guns. The upper deck was cut down forward and aft, where these guns were installed in individual barbettes. The barbettes, which appeared to be standard, heavily-armored mountings, actually consisted of about 250 mm (10 in) of wood and a thin 13 mm (0.5 in) plating. The guns themselves were fitted with 25 mm thick gun shields. Eight 150 mm (5.9 in) L/25 Krupp guns and six 105 mm (4.1 in) L/25 Krupp guns were installed on the broadside. The 150 mm guns took the place of the old Krupp guns in the gun battery, though half of the gun ports were plated over, while the 105 mm guns were installed in sponsons in the upper deck. Two of the 47 mm guns were removed and three more Nordenfelt guns were added. During the refit, she also received two vertical triple-expansion engines in place of her original machinery, and six coal-fired Scotch marine boilers replaced the box boilers; the new propulsion system allowed her to steam at a speed of 10 knots (19 km/h; 12 mph). She was again placed out of service in 1897 in Çanakkale.

=== Later career ===
That year, with the outbreak of the Greco-Turkish War in February 1897, Osmaniye was mobilized into the 1st Squadron. The Ottomans inspected the fleet and found that almost all of the vessels, including Osmaniye, to be completely unfit for combat against the Greek Navy, which possessed the three modern Hydra-class ironclads. Despite the fact that Osmaniye and her sisters had been refit just three years previously, the inspectors discovered that many of the pistons on their Krupp guns were bent, rendering the guns useless. Through April and May, the Ottoman fleet made several sorties into the Aegean Sea in an attempt to raise morale among the ships' crews, though the Ottomans had no intention of attacking Greek forces. On 15 May, Osmaniye took part in a training exercise that only served to highlight the poor training of the crews. With no possibility left to use the fleet in an active way, the Navy withdrew Osmaniye from service and removed her guns.

The condition of the Ottoman fleet could not be concealed from foreign observers, particularly the British Admiral Henry Wood and the German Admiral Eugen Kalau vom Hofe, who led the inspection. The fleet proved to be an embarrassment for the government and finally forced Sultan Abdul Hamid II to authorize a modernization program, which recommended that the ironclads be modernized in foreign shipyards. German firms, including Krupp, Schichau-Werke, and AG Vulcan, were to rebuild the ships, but after having surveyed the ships, withdrew from the project in December 1897 owing to the impracticality of modernizing the ships and the inability of the Ottoman government to pay for the work due to its weak finances. Following a lengthy process of negotiations, Krupp received the contract to rebuild Osmaniye on 11 August 1900, along with several other warships. By December 1902, however, Krupp withdrew from the deal, and Osmaniye was ultimately not reconstructed. In 1908, Osmaniye was towed back to Constantinople, where on 31 July 1909 she was decommissioned. She remained in the Navy's inventory until 1923, however, when she was sold to ship breakers.
