= Armstrong Creek =

Armstrong Creek may refer to:

== United States ==
- Armstrong Creek (Pennsylvania), a tributary of the Susquehanna River in Pennsylvania
- Armstrong Creek (West Virginia), a stream
- Armstrong Creek, Wisconsin, a town in Forest County, Wisconsin
  - Armstrong Creek (community), Wisconsin, an unincorporated community in the above town

== Australia ==
- Armstrong Creek, Queensland, a locality within the Moreton Bay region
- Armstrong Creek, Victoria, a suburb of the Geelong region
- Armstrong Creek Growth Area, a growth area of the Geelong region

== See also ==
- Armstrong River (disambiguation)
