= Armstrong (automobile) =

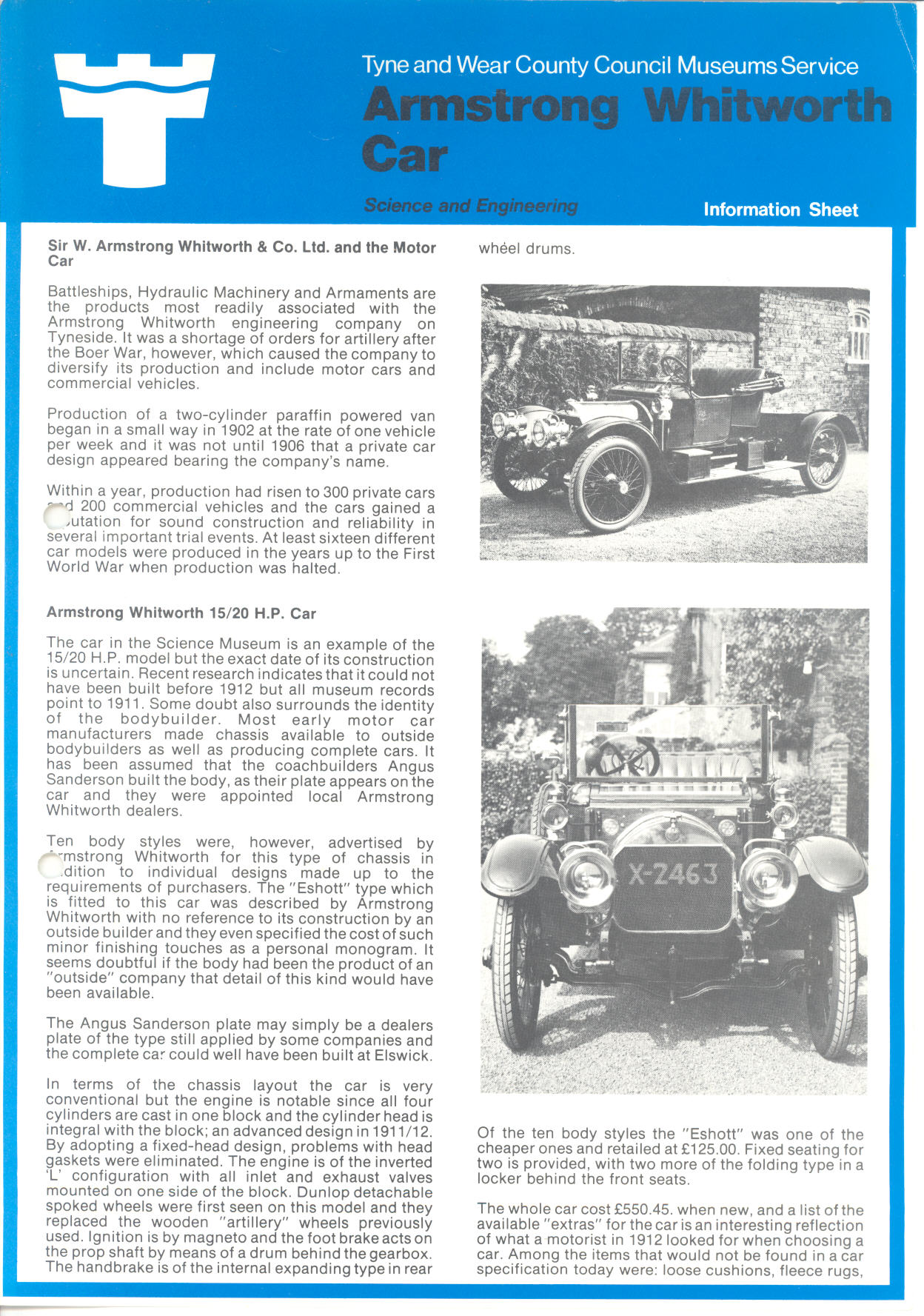
Tyne & Wear County Council Museums Service Information Sheet Armstrong Whitworth car front.Unknown date about 1979

The Armstrong was an English automobile manufactured from 1902 to 1904; "claimed to be the best hill-climber extant", the car featured an 8 hp (6.0 kW) International engine.

After 1904, vehicle production came under Armstrong Whitworth.
