= Armstrong, Georgia =

Coordinates: 33.8101251°N 82.7623643°W

Armstrong is an extinct town in Wilkes County, in the U.S. state of Georgia.

== History ==
A post office called Armstrong was established in 1900, and remained in operation until 1905. The community was located inland away from railroads.
