= Armstrong River =

Armstrong River may refer to:

- Armstrong River (Manitoba), United States
- Armstrong River (Minnesota), United States
- Armstrong River (Northern Territory), Australia

== See also ==
- Armstrong Creek (disambiguation)
