= The Armstrongs =

Documentary series

- Created by: Fergus O'Brien
- Starring: Ann Armstrong; John Armstrong; Michael Handel; Basil Mienie
- Country of origin: United Kingdom
- No. of episodes: 8 (Series 1); and a Christmas special

Production
- Running time: 30 minutes Christmas Special: 90 minutes

Original release
- Network: BBC Two
- Release: 22 February – 10 May 2006

The Armstrongs is a British documentary television series broadcast on BBC Two in the UK. The Armstrongs is an access-all-areas insight into the unorthodox and sometimes ruthless business antics that are routine at "U-Fit", Coventry's third-biggest double glazing company. The show is narrated by actor Bill Nighy.

This was the second TV outing for the Armstrongs. The first was in a one-off documentary in 2003 called The Office Christmas Party, which showed the preparations for U-Fit's Christmas party.

In July 2014, Ann Armstrong announced on Facebook that she and John had split up.

== Overview ==
Driven by the desire for profit, management team John and Ann Armstrong are constantly spying on their unwieldy sales force with CCTV cameras and phone taps. But motivating the team is an uphill struggle and John and Ann must resort to ever-more desperate measures to boost sales. Despite their best endeavours, their plans backfire with alarming frequency. However, woe betide anyone who gets in the way of their dream of becoming multi-millionaires.

The idea is a kind of all-too-real-life version of The Office, set in Coventry. Ann is the more talkative of the two, a mixture of starry-eyed optimist and petty disciplinarian. John mostly just swears a lot and criticises Ann's schemes for improving the company – such as hiring a Zimbabwean motivational guru called Basil Mienie (pronounced 'meanie').

== The Armstrongs: The Movie ==
A film length special was made for Christmas in 2006. It was compiled from material from the series.

== Aftermath ==
After the show was broadcast the pair released a book; The Armstrongs' A-Z Guide to Life. They went on to purchase and run a beauty salon called Younique.
