= Armstrong Group of Companies =

Cable, telecommunications and internet service provider

Armstrong
- Type: Private
- Industry: Telecommunication
- Founded: 1946
- Founder: Jud L. Sedwick
- Headquarters: Butler, Pennsylvania, United States
- Key people: Jay L. Sedwick (Chairman); Kirby J. Campbell (Vice Chairman); Dru A. Sedwick (President and CEO); Jeff Ross (President Armstrong Utilities)
- Products: Broadband Internet, Cable television, Telephone
- Number of employees: 2,300+
- Website: http://armstrongonewire.com

Armstrong is a major northeastern cable television, telecommunications and internet service provider servicing Pennsylvania, Ohio, New York, West Virginia, Kentucky, and Maryland. Armstrong Utilities, Inc. ranks among the 15 largest multi-system operators in the United States.

== History ==
Armstrong began in 1946 and was originally called Armstrong County Line Construction. Founded by Jud L. Sedwick, the company was headquartered in Kittanning, Armstrong County, in Pennsylvania. Together with his brother Ned, Sedwick ran two crews consisting of six men each, whose job consisted of hanging telephone lines, setting telephone poles, and clearing right of way throughout western Pennsylvania, and managed to grow the company to 12 crews by the end of its first year of operations.

== Today ==
Armstrong is in Pennsylvania, Ohio, Maryland, New York, West Virginia, and Kentucky for its digital cable services, most commonly providing television, telephone and high-speed Internet service. Currently, Armstrong employs over 2,300 people. The company's headquarters are in Butler County, western Pennsylvania, with local offices scattered throughout the region.

== Services offered ==
=== Armstrong Cable ===
In 1963, Armstrong's first cable television customers were connected in Butler, Pennsylvania. These customers were provided with nine viewing channels. For the next 40+ years Armstrong continued to grow in western Pennsylvania and the surrounding states virtually uncontested for television service until the expansion of satellite service became more widespread. With the increase in competitors, new services emerged. Armstrong cable now offers personal video recorders (PVR), video on demand service (VOD), pay-per-view service (PPV), as well as high-definition digital programming.

=== Armstrong Zoom Internet ===
Armstrong also offers broadband internet service for residential and commercial customers. From 2013 to 2017 Armstrong instituted a 200GB monthly data cap. In March 2017, this was raised to 400GB. Consumers can pay more to increase the data cap. If the customer goes over the cap, they are not throttled nor shut off but instead pay an additional $10 for every 50GB they go over. As of March 2018, that data cap was raised to 1024GB(1TB) with the Zoom level of service, but the Zoom 2 and above levels have a 2048GB(2TB) data cap, while Zoom Extreme offers no data cap. Armstrong no longer has data caps on any plan as of May 2023.

=== Armstrong Cable Telephone ===
Armstrong offers a cable telephone service that can be bundled with either the video or internet product or as a stand-alone product. This service provides unlimited nationwide calling, as well as calling to Canada, Puerto Rico, and Guam.

=== Armstrong Telephone Company ===
Originated in 1950 by purchasing Ritchie Telephone Company in Harrisville, West Virginia, Armstrong owns and operates independent telephone companies in West Virginia, Maryland, Pennsylvania, and New York. These local offices are set up to provide local and long-distance calling services, optional digital calling features, and DSL Internet services.

== Awards and recognition ==
=== 2012 Best Customer Service Award ===
CableFAX Magazine, a leading telecommunications publication, awarded Armstrong the 2012 Best Customer Service Award for service excellence among independent cable operators nationwide.

Armstrong has been rated #1 in customer service by Consumer Reports for two years. (2014 & 2015) Internet Service Providers were ranked at the bottom of Consumer Reports lists for those years.

== Political activities ==
In 2012, Armstrong offered 2016: Obama's America for free to its customers. In that same year, Armstrong donated over $1 million in the form of "in-kind cable access" to American Crossroads, a Republican Super PAC. Armstrong also donated $40,000 to Fight for the Dream PAC, a Super PAC that opposed the re-election of Senator Bob Casey.
