= Robert Napier and Sons =

Scottish shipbuilding company

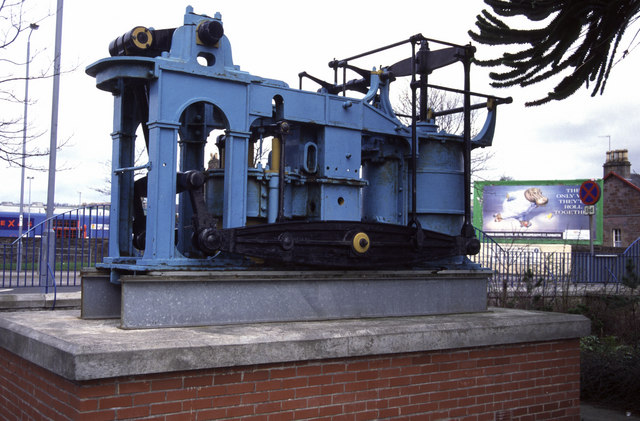
Early side-lever engine designed by Napier, from PS Leven (1823), on display at the Scottish Maritime Museum in Dumbarton

Messrs Robert Napier and Sons was a famous firm of Clyde shipbuilders and marine engineers at Govan, Glasgow founded by Robert Napier in 1826. It was moved to Govan for more space in 1841. His sons James and John were taken into partnership in 1853.

The whole Clyde, every engineer and shipbuilder in it, was considered to have benefitted from the firm's achievements and celebrity. By the 1840s it was universally recognised as the finest in Britain. Many firms were founded by former employees.

After Robert Napier's death in 1876 the plant and goodwill were sold by auction in March 1877 and purchased by a group of engineers led by the previous manager, A C Kirk. It continued to build ships and engines until 1900 when it was incorporated in William Beardmore and Company.

== Beginnings ==
In 1800 Glasgow had no shipbuilding firms. Aged 23, Robert Napier set himself up in his own smith business (Note: define) in Glasgow's Greyfriars Wynd Gallowgate in 1815.

=== Engines ===
In 1821 he took over his first cousin David Napier's Camlachie foundry and works and for his works manager chose David Elder (1795–1866) (in 1824 father of John Elder). They made city water pipes then a stationary engine. They built Napier's first marine engine for Leven in 1823. David Elder designed many of his engines. Contracts were won for the supply of engines to a steamer called Eclipse in 1826 and four years later for the vessels of the Glasgow Steam Packet Company. In 1834 they won the contract to supply engines to the Dundee and London Shipping Company.

In 1828 Robert Napier expanded his operations to the nearby Vulcan Foundry re-equipping it, two years later handing over Camlachie to one of his brothers. Eight years later he leased (then in 1841 he bought) his cousin David Napier's Lancefield Quay Foundry and Docks on the north side of the Clyde.

There in 1836 he built Berenice, the East India Company's first steamer, he sub-contracted the hull to John Wood and Company, and their Zenobia and in 1841, HMS Akbar. His first contract for a steamer for Her Majesty's Government won in 1840 was for HMS Vesuvius and followed by HMS Stromboli.

Between 1843 and 1864 the firm built 114 vessels and by 1864 employed more than 3,000 men. The yard built the first Cunard Line ships and later added many more.

=== Hulls of Iron and Steel ===
From 1842 Robert Napier and Son built at a new yard across the Clyde at Govan their own iron-hulled vessels, river-steamers at first, instead of contracting out for the supply of wooden hulls. Parkhead Forge was bought in 1848 to supply wrought iron plates and forgings. Steel hulls were introduced in the early 1880s.

== Cunard ==
Between 1840 and 1855 Napier's supplied engines for the entire Cunard Line paddle fleet, the timber hulls were made for Napier's by John Wood of Port Glasgow and Steele & Co of Greenock. In 1850 Napier's began to build iron-hulled river steamers then deep sea vessels and in 1852 launched a screw steamship for the Peninsular and Oriental Steamship Company.

- RMS Persia, an iron paddle steamer, was launched from Napier's yard in 1854, one of the largest then afloat.

== Naval engines and ships ==
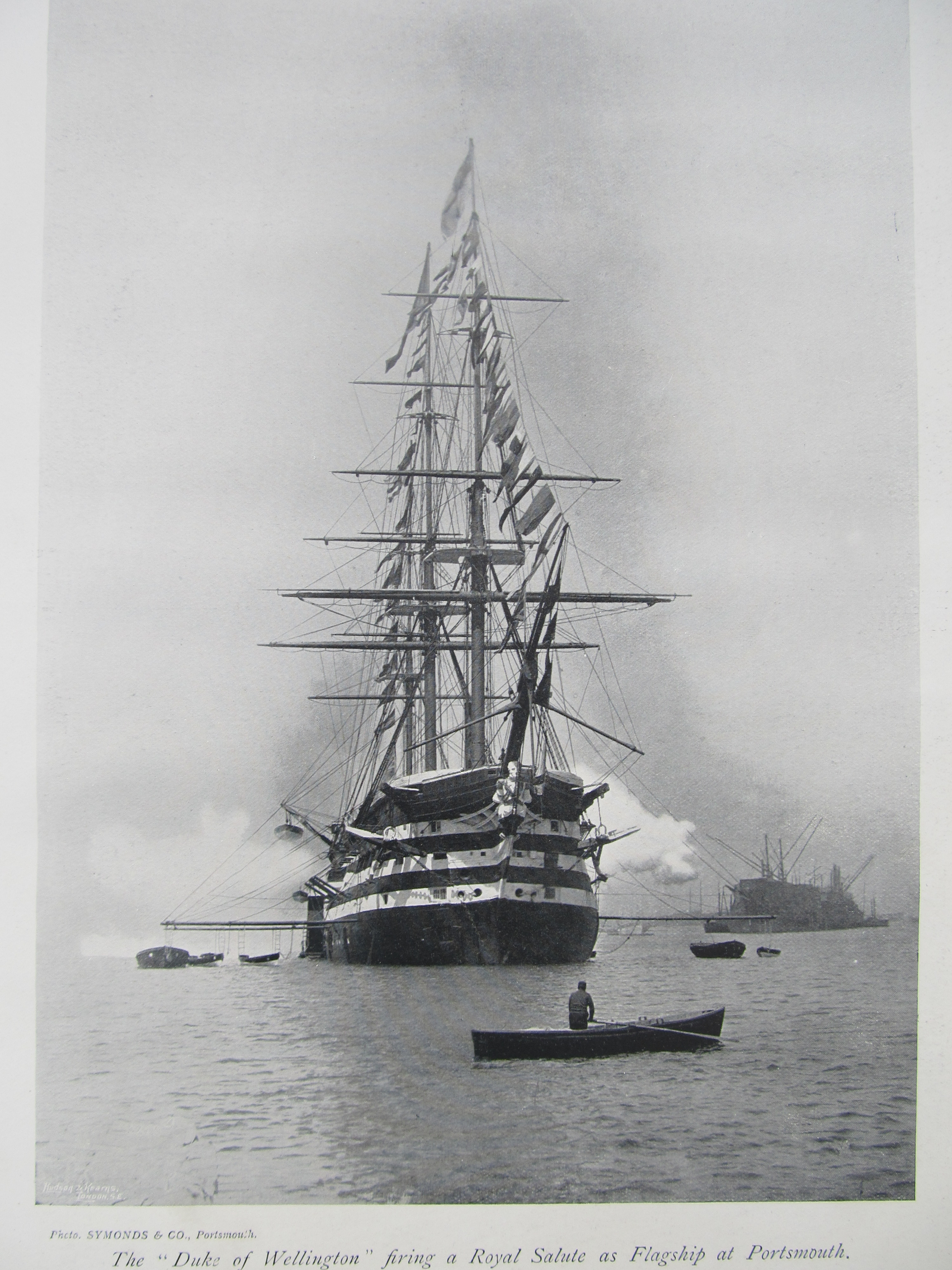
HMS Duke of Wellington 1852, the Navy's largest warship (her Napier engines were transferred from the frigate Simoon) firing a gun salute in Portsmouth Harbour during her time as flagship there.

- Engines for a further 52 vessels were supplied to the Royal Navy as well as for the vessels listed below
- Engines were "extensively" employed by private shipowners
- Engines were supplied to 29 foreign governments

=== Royal Navy ===
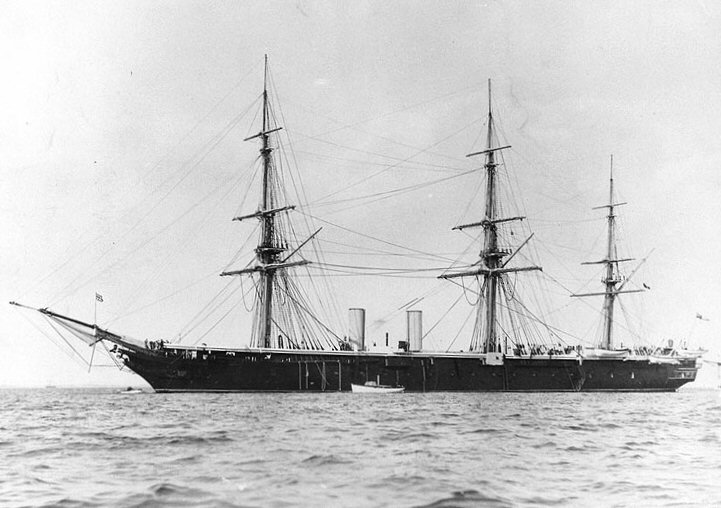
HMS Black Prince in the 1880s

Ships built for the Royal Navy included:

Erebus
Black Prince
Hector
Audacious
Invincible
Hotspur
Northampton

These ships were all armour-clad with a tonnage of 26,938 tons and the engines together represent 5,450 horsepower

=== Danish Navy ===
One turret ship, Rolf Krake (1863)

=== Ottoman government ===
Three of 4,000 tons each with engines of 400 horsepower

- Osmaniye
- Aziziye
- Orhaniye

=== Dutch government ===
Two ships, monitor Tijger (1868) and coast defence ship Buffel (1868)

=== Japanese government ===
SS Meiji Maru was built for the Japanese government as a lighthouse tender.

=== Management ===
James Napier took over active management of Napier's after his father nominally retired in 1852 but left it to younger brother John in 1857. Elder brother James (1821–1879) was one of the most distinguished marine engineers of his time. However Napier's began to lose its technical lead.

Financial difficulties arose in 1859 brought on by difficulties in constructing HMS Black Prince to the Admiralty's specification. Father and sons failed to agree on the business's future. In 1871 there was a forced sale of Parkhead Forge and then Robert Napier was persuaded to enter full retirement and the brothers were able to achieve financial stability.

== New partnership 1877 ==
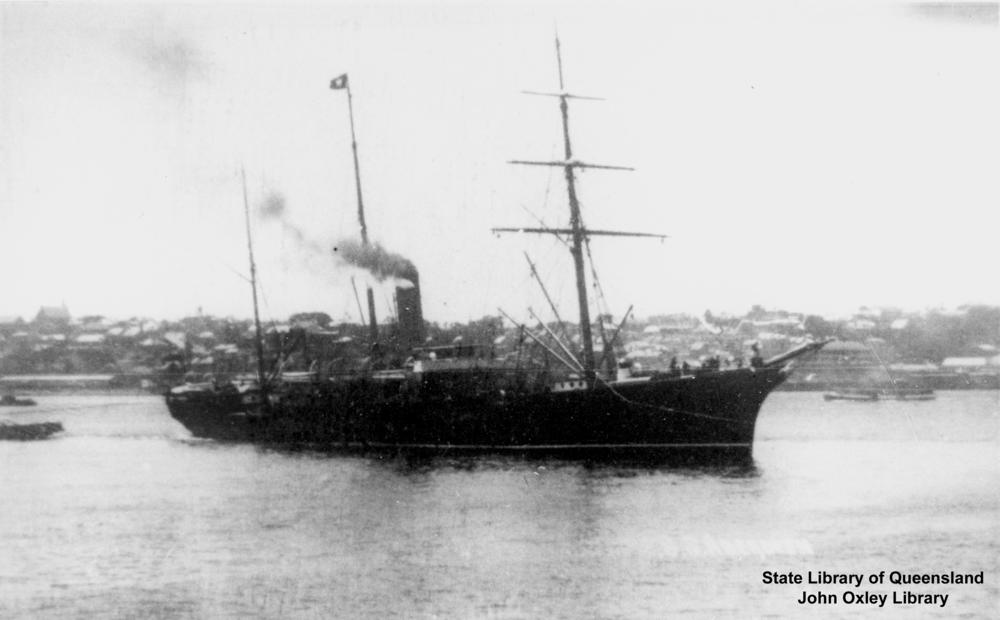
SS Aberdeen

After Robert Napier's death new partners led by marine engineer Dr Kirk (Note: Alexander Carnegie Kirk born Barry, Forfarshire 1830, died Glasgow 5 October 1892) the previous manager, built for George Thompson's Aberdeen White Star Line the single screw iron SS Aberdeen with a three crank triple expansion engine and delivered in 1881. It was designed for the Australia trade passing through the Suez canal. Aberdeen had an iron hull. Sold to Turkey in 1906 it was eventually scrapped in 1919.

== Innovation ==
In late 1881 they delivered Parisian to the Allan Line. It was the first steel-hulled vessel to cross the Atlantic.

The engine of Aberdeen was the prototype of thousands of triple expansion engines constructed in the following decades.

== Caledonian Maritime Research Trust ==
The Trust's database of Clyde-built ships lists 256 vessels built by Robert Napier and Sons.
