= Armstrong gun =

British artillery piece

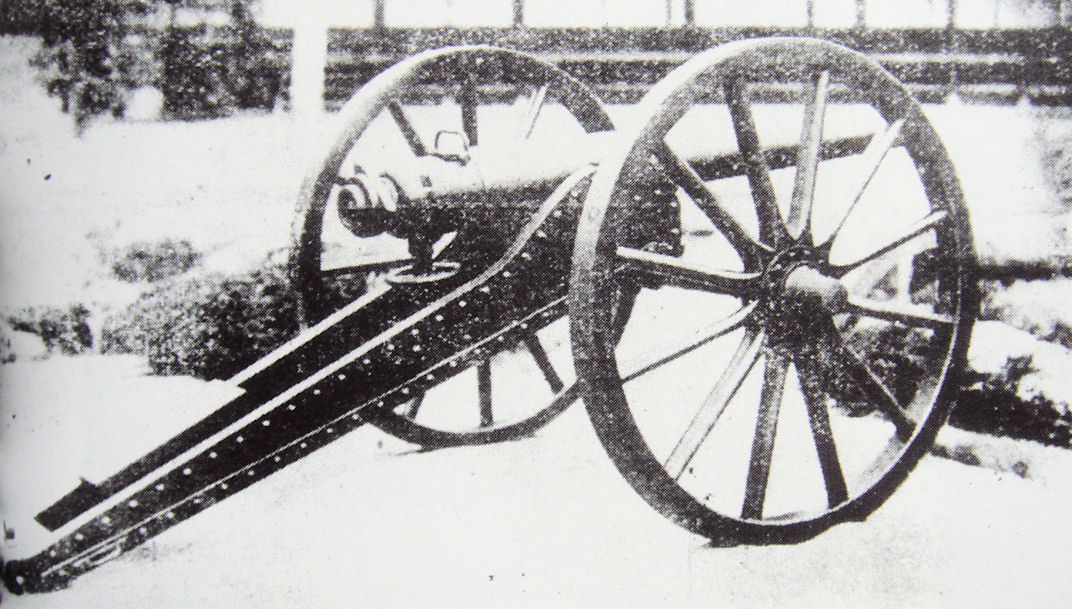
Armstrong gun deployed by Japan during the Boshin War (1868–69).

An Armstrong gun was a type of rifled breech-loading field and heavy artillery piece designed by Sir William Armstrong. It was first manufactured in England starting in 1855 by the Elswick Ordnance Company and the Royal Arsenal at Woolwich. The Armstrong gun employed a distinctive built-up gun construction method. The core of the gun consisted of a wrought iron (and later, mild steel) inner tube, which was reinforced by a series of wrought-iron coils shrunk over it. This design kept the inner tube under constant compression, increasing its strength and resistance to internal pressure generated during firing.

== The Armstrong rifled breechloading guns of the 1850s-1860s ==
In 1854, Armstrong approached the Secretary of State for War with a proposal to construct a rifled breech-loading 3-pounder gun for evaluation. The gun was later modified to a 5-pounder, and the design proved successful in terms of both range and accuracy. Over the next three years, Armstrong further developed his system of construction and adapted it to guns of larger calibres.

Armstrong’s system was officially adopted in 1858, initially for “special service in the field.” At first, production was limited to smaller artillery pieces, including 6-pounder/2.7 kg (2.5 in/64 mm) mountain or light field guns, 9-pounder/4.1 kg (3 in/76 mm) guns for horse artillery, and 12-pounder/5.4 kg (3 in/76 mm) field guns.

Although Armstrong did not consider his system suitable for heavier guns, the government directed him to develop larger calibres, including the 20-pounder/9.1 kg (3.75 in/95 mm) field and naval gun, the 40-pounder/18 kg (4.75 in/121 mm) siege gun, and the 110-pounder/50 kg (7 in/180 mm) heavy gun. The Royal Navy adopted all three guns, and all except the 20-pounder saw service in New Zealand.

=== Armstrong breech-loading system ===
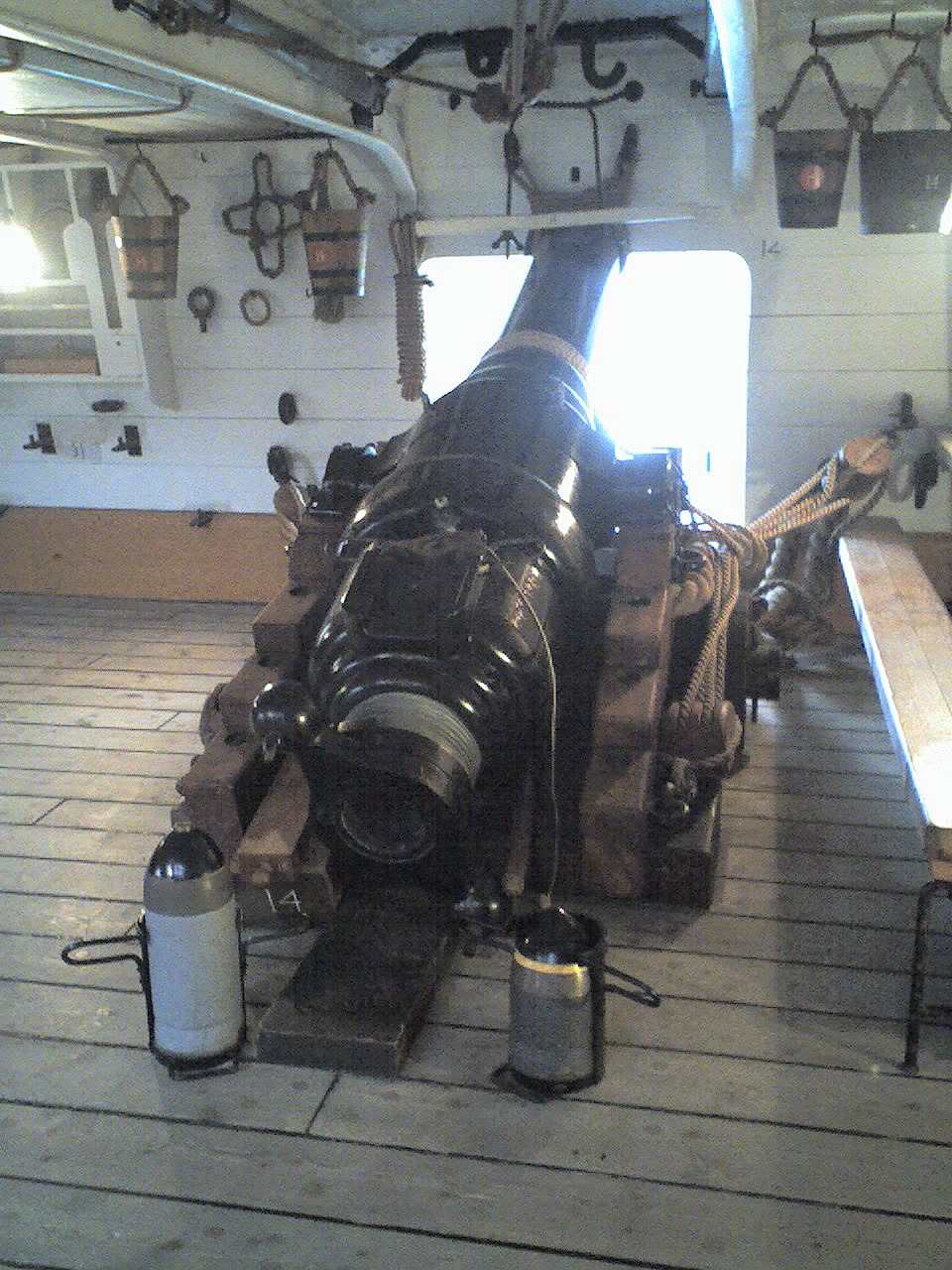
Fibreglass replica of the 7-inch 110-pounder Armstrong gun on HMS Warrior

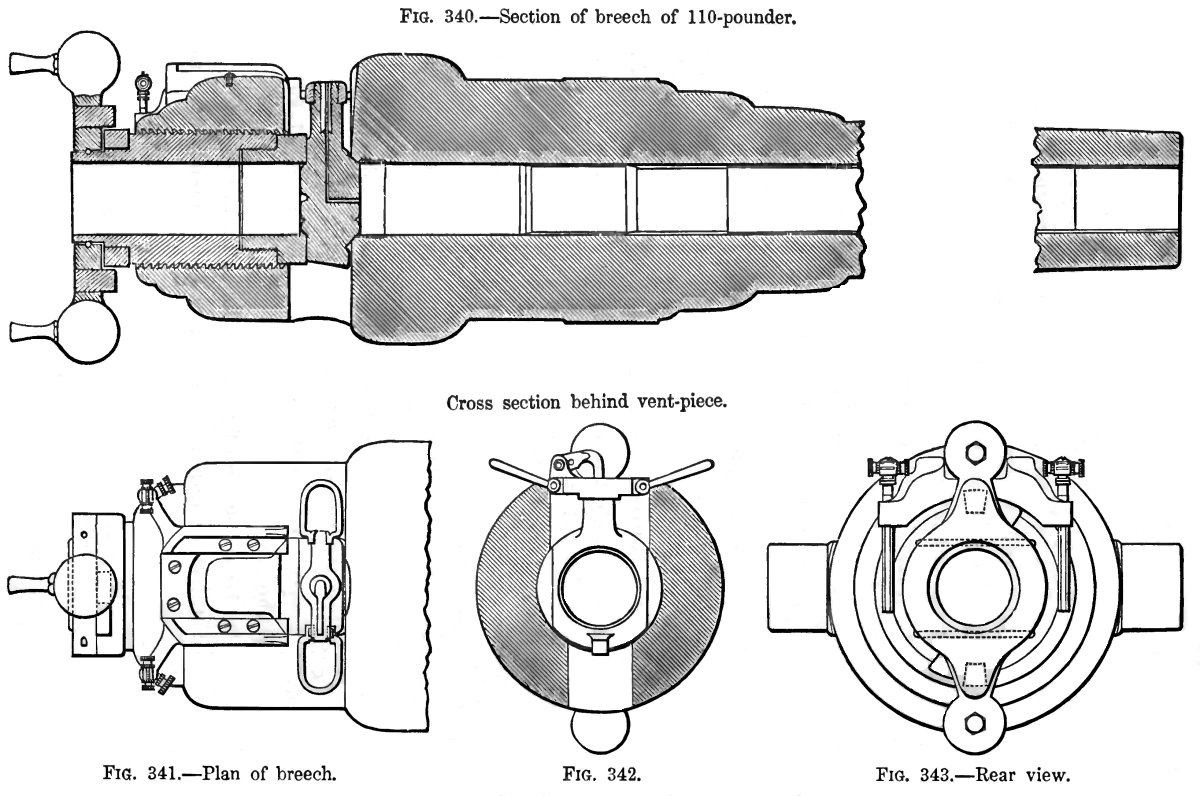
Screw breech mechanism of the 7-inch Armstrong gun

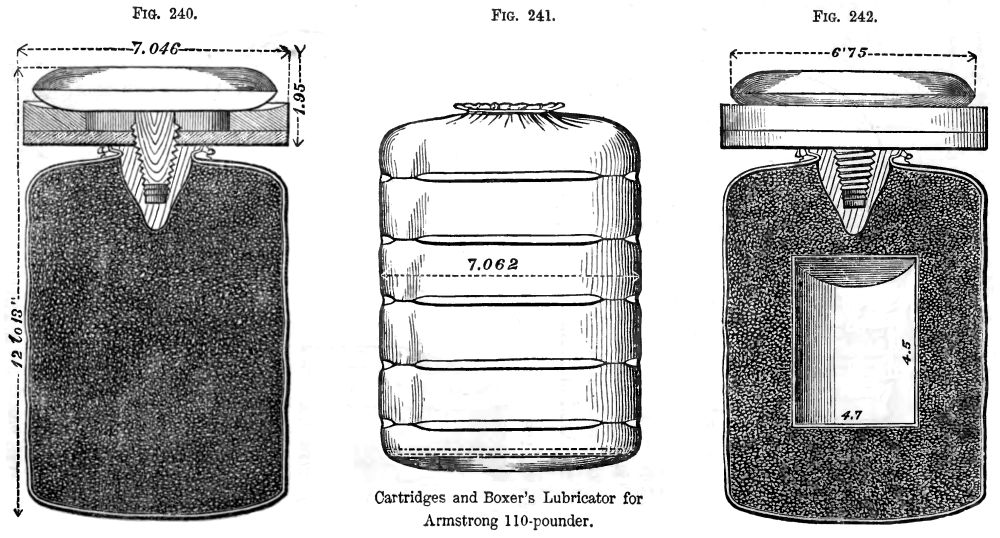
Powder cartridge with lubricator

Armstrong’s guns used a “built-up” construction, comprising a central “A” tube—initially made of wrought iron, and from 1863 onwards of mild steel toughened by oil treatment—forming the bore. Over this tube were shrunk several wrought-iron coils which kept the central tube under compression, along with a breech-piece and a trunnion ring. The guns employed a “polygroove” rifling system: the bore had 38 grooves along its length, with a twist rate of one complete turn per 38 calibres.

The cast iron shell, shaped similarly to a Minié ball, had a thin lead coating making it slightly larger than the bore diameter; this coating engaged with the rifling grooves to impart spin. This system was originally developed by Martin von Wahrendorff and Giovanni Cavalli in Sweden. The spin stabilization, combined with the elimination of windage due to the tight fit, allowed the gun to achieve greater range and accuracy than contemporary smoothbore muzzle-loaders while using a smaller powder charge.

Each gunpowder cartridge was topped with a “lubricator” composed of a mixture of tallow and linseed oil contained between two tin plates, backed by a felt wad coated with beeswax, and finally sealed with millboard. The lubricator followed the shell down the bore; the lubricant was squeezed out between the tin plates, while the wad cleaned lead deposits left by the shell’s coating, leaving the bore clean for subsequent rounds.

A particularly innovative feature, more commonly associated with 20th-century artillery, was Armstrong’s “grip”: a slight reduction in diameter over the last 6 inches (150 mm) of the bore at the muzzle end, effectively a squeeze bore. This section centred the shell before leaving the barrel and swaged down its lead coating slightly, reducing its diameter and improving ballistic performance.

The Armstrong breech loaders used a vertical sliding block called a vent-piece, which had a conical copper-ringed plug on its front surface to seal the firing chamber and close the breech. The guns featured a hollow breech screw behind the vent-piece, which the gunner rotated to tighten and seal the breech before firing, hence the name “screw breech.”

To load and fire the gun, the following steps were performed:

- The breech screw was loosened by turning it.
- The vent-piece was raised.
- The shell was inserted through the hollow breech screw and rammed into the bore.
- The powder cartridge was inserted through the breech screw into the chamber.
- A primer tube was inserted into the vent-piece (only necessary for the 40-pounder and 110-pounder due to their size).
- The vent-piece was lowered.
- The breech screw was tightened to seal the breech.
- A friction tube with an attached lanyard was inserted into the hole at the top of the vent-piece.
- The gunner pulled the lanyard, igniting a gunpowder charge in the vent tube; the flash passed through the vent in the vent-piece, assisted by the primer if present, into the powder chamber, igniting the main charge.

=== Armstrong guns in action ===
The British used Armstrong guns extensively and with great effect during the Second Opium War. As reported by the translator Robert Swinhoe after the British attack on the Chinese fort at Pehtang:

Numbers of dead Chinese lay about the guns, some most fearfully lacerated. The wall afforded very little protection to the Tartar gunners, and it was astonishing how they managed to stand so long against the destructive fire that our Armstrongs poured on them; but I observed, in more instances than one, that the unfortunate creatures had been tied to the guns by the legs.

The Armstrong gun—primarily the 12-pounder—was used extensively during the 1863 conflict in New Zealand between British troops and Māori in the Waikato. A well-preserved 12-pounder/5.4 kg used at the Battle of Rangiriri is displayed at the Te Awamutu Museum. The barrel could traverse 6 degrees left or right without moving the gun carriage. The wheels were wooden with 75 mm wide steel bands, with a diameter of 1.7 m. The track width was 1.8 m, and the barrel width at the muzzle measured 140 mm. Such was the army’s confidence in the gun’s accuracy that, at the Battle of Hairini Ridge, the artillery fired over the heads of advancing infantry as they stormed the ridge. The infantry took cover in a slight depression in the ground in front of the Māori trenches and then charged the trenches once the shelling ceased.

On 4 July 1868, Armstrong guns were used at the Battle of Ueno by forces supporting the Imperial government of Japan.

Armstrong guns were also used against British and Indian troops during the Second Anglo-Afghan War, notably at the Battle of Charasiab. Howard Hensman describes six guns being captured by a combined Anglo-Indian expedition under the command of Brigadier-General Baker.

== Return to muzzle-loading guns ==
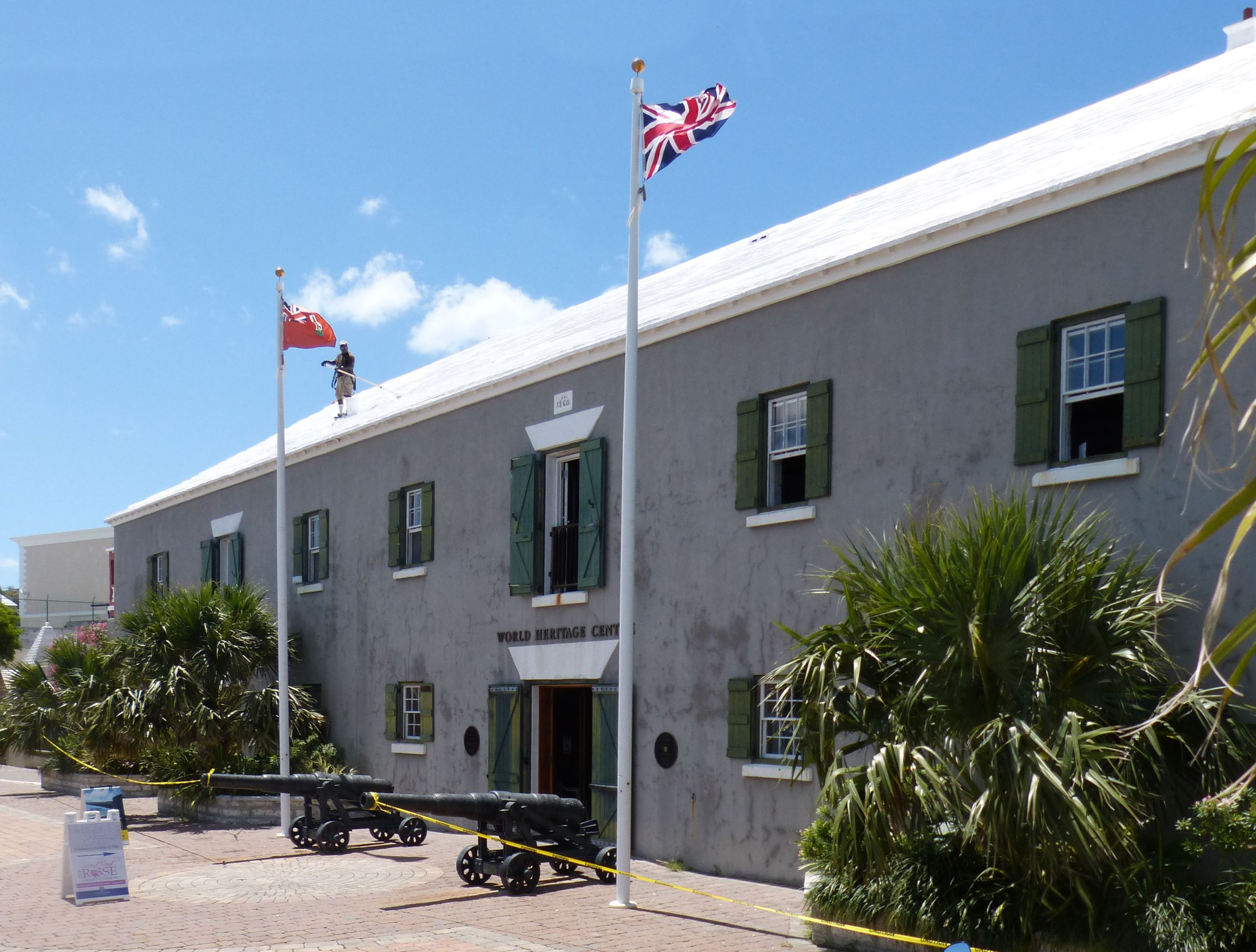
Two RBL 40-pounder Armstrong guns displayed at the St. George's Foundation's UNESCO World Heritage Centre, St. George's Town, Bermuda. Originally used as mobile guns for defending areas of Bermuda's South Shore without fixed coastal artillery, they were soon replaced and repurposed as part of a saluting battery at Fort Victoria before being set into a wharf as bollards.

In 1863, an ordnance Select Committee was convened to assess the relative merits of muzzle-loading and breech-loading guns. In 1864, even before the committee had concluded its investigation, the British Government halted the manufacture of Armstrong breech-loaders. When the committee issued its final report in August 1865, it concluded:

The many-grooved system of rifling with its lead-coated projectiles and complicated breech-loading arrangements is far inferior for the general purposes of war to the muzzle-loading system and has the disadvantage of being more expensive in both original cost and ammunition. Muzzle-loading guns are far superior to breech-loaders in simplicity of construction and efficiency for active service; they can be loaded and worked with perfect ease and abundant rapidity.

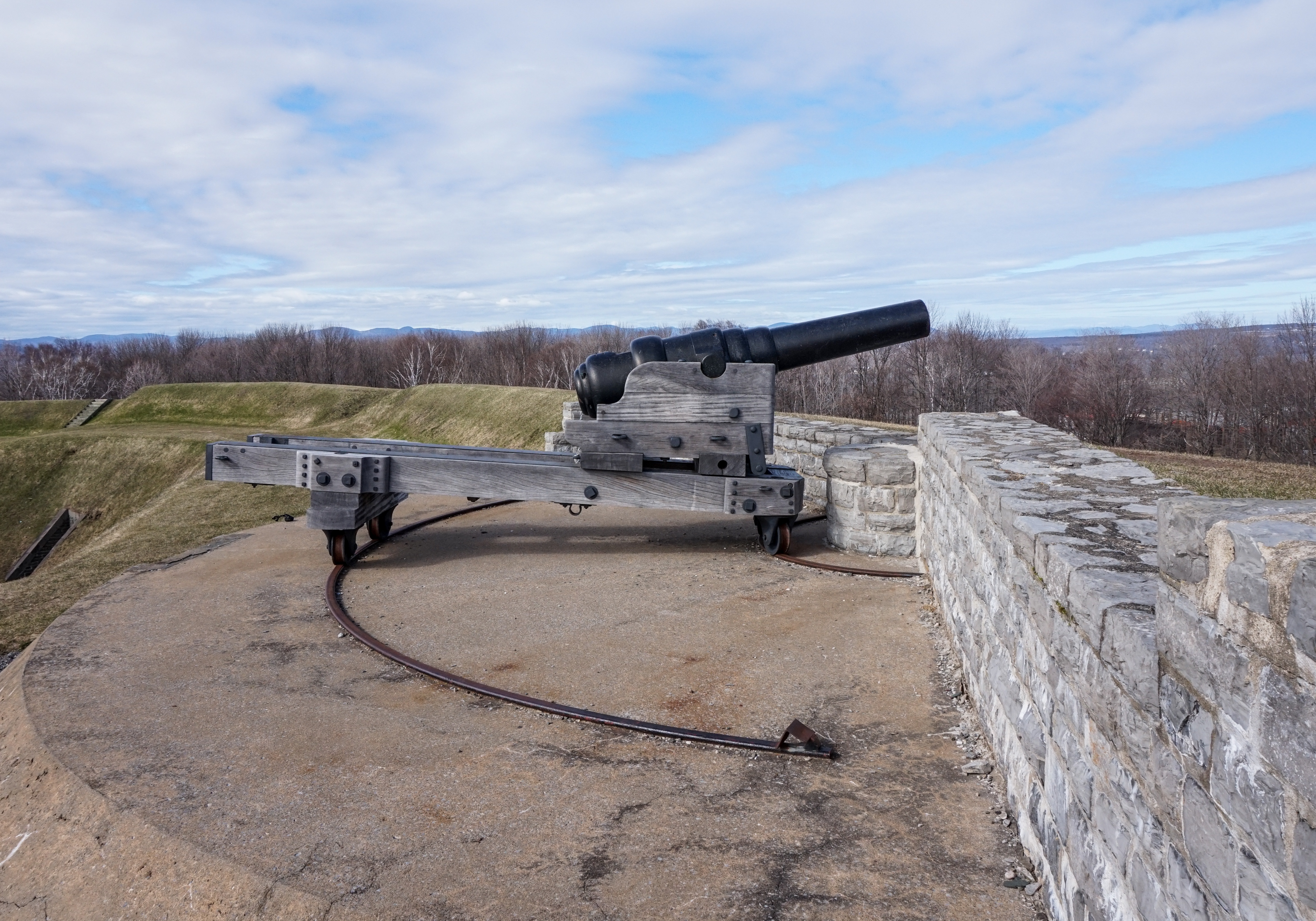
Armstrong gun at Fort No. 1, Lévis, Quebec, Canada

However, the report also acknowledged that while Armstrong guns were more costly, they were undoubtedly safer. It was not uncommon for cast-iron muzzle-loaders to burst during firing, but no Armstrong gun had ever done so. Moreover, misfires could be safely cleared from the breech in Armstrong designs. In contrast, a misfire in a muzzle-loader—such as the RML 17.72 inches (450 mm) gun at the Napier of Magdala Battery in Gibraltar—required extreme measures; in one instance, a gunner had to be lowered head-first down the bore to attach an extractor to the shell. Smaller muzzle-loading guns, however, were typically equipped with standard extraction tools.

Despite a subsequent report that highlighted the advantages of breech-loaders, cost considerations prevailed. The Committee ultimately concluded that "the balance of advantages is in favour of muzzle-loading field guns," and in 1865 Britain officially reverted from breech-loading ordnance to muzzle-loading systems.

Tests conducted in 1859 with the Armstrong 40-pounder/18 kg, and again in 1869 with the Armstrong rifled 100-pounder/45 kg, demonstrated that neither gun was capable of penetrating 4 inches (102 mm) of armour, even at ranges as close as 50 yards (46 m). This limitation was significant, as Britain, a dominant maritime power, relied heavily on the ability of its naval ordnance to penetrate the armour of newly developed enemy warships.

In an effort to address the shortcomings of his original screw breech mechanism, Armstrong developed an alternative horizontal sliding wedge breech system for 40-pounder/18 kg and 64-pounder/29 kg guns. However, by that time, the Government had already committed to reverting to muzzle-loading artillery.

To enable rifling in muzzle-loaders, Armstrong proposed a new system in 1866 whereby shells were equipped with external studs that engaged with corresponding grooves in the barrel. This system was adopted by the Government for the first generation of rifled muzzle-loaders, designated "RML," and incorporated Armstrong’s built-up wrought-iron construction method, which was considered sound and reliable.

== Later Armstrong breechloaders ==
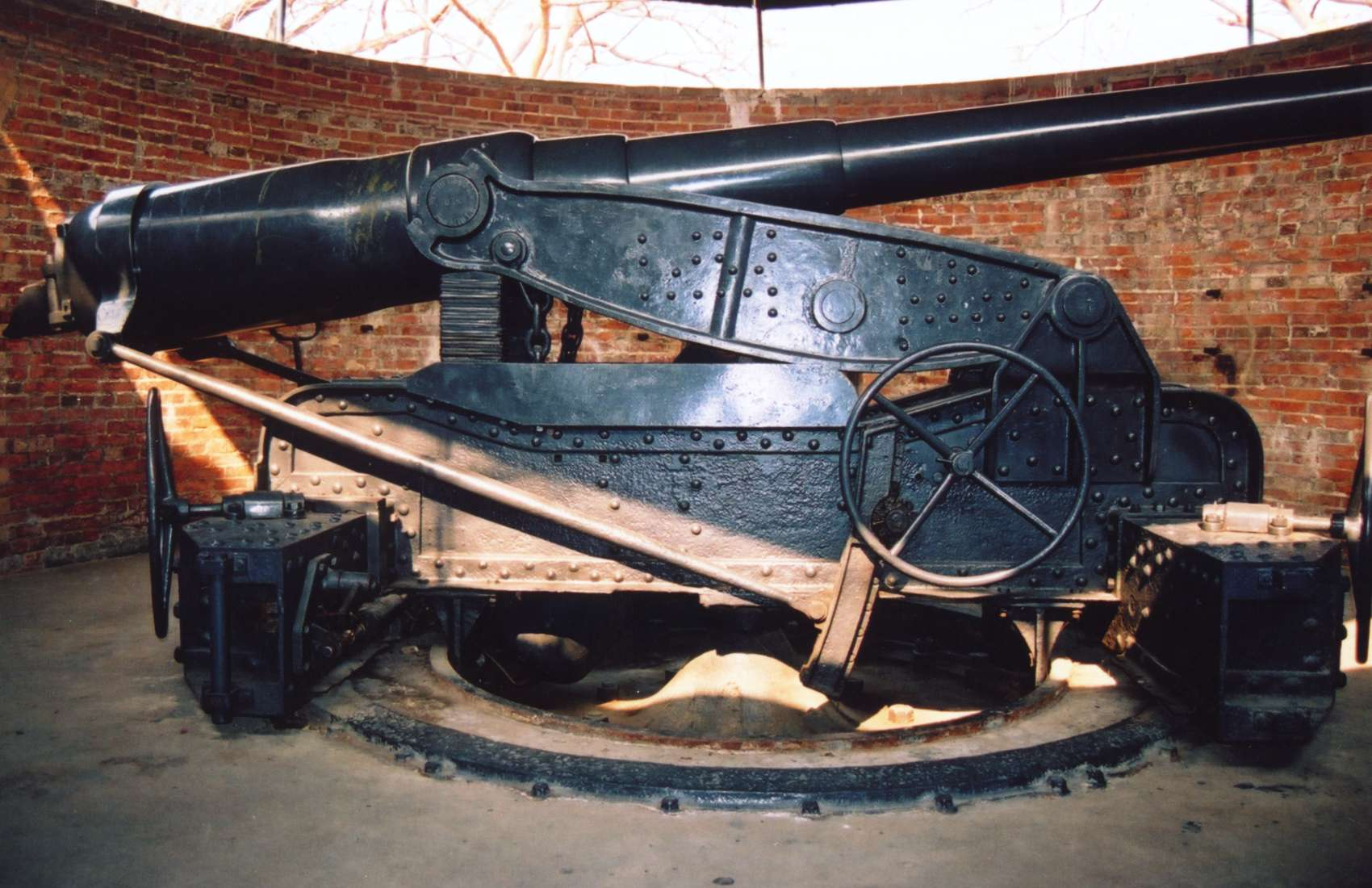
Armstrong 6 inches (150 mm) breech-loading disappearing gun of the 1880s at Chulachomklao Fort, Samut Prakan, Thailand

Armstrong returned to the manufacture of breech-loading guns in the 1880s, employing an interrupted thread breech mechanism that incorporated the proprietary "Armstrong cup" and later adopted the de Bange system of obturation. Unlike the earlier 1858 design, which relied on manual effort to create a gas seal, these newer methods used the explosive force of the gun’s firing to achieve obturation more effectively.

During this period, Armstrong became a major supplier of modern "BL" (breech-loading) guns to the Royal Navy, the British Army, and the international export market, continuing into the 1920s. However, it is the earlier generation of "RBL" (rifled breech-loading) guns from the mid-19th century that are most commonly referred to as "Armstrong guns."

== See also ==
- Rifled breech loader
- Disappearing gun for the Armstrong Disappearing Gun.
