= Rifled muzzle loader =

Mid-19th century artillery type

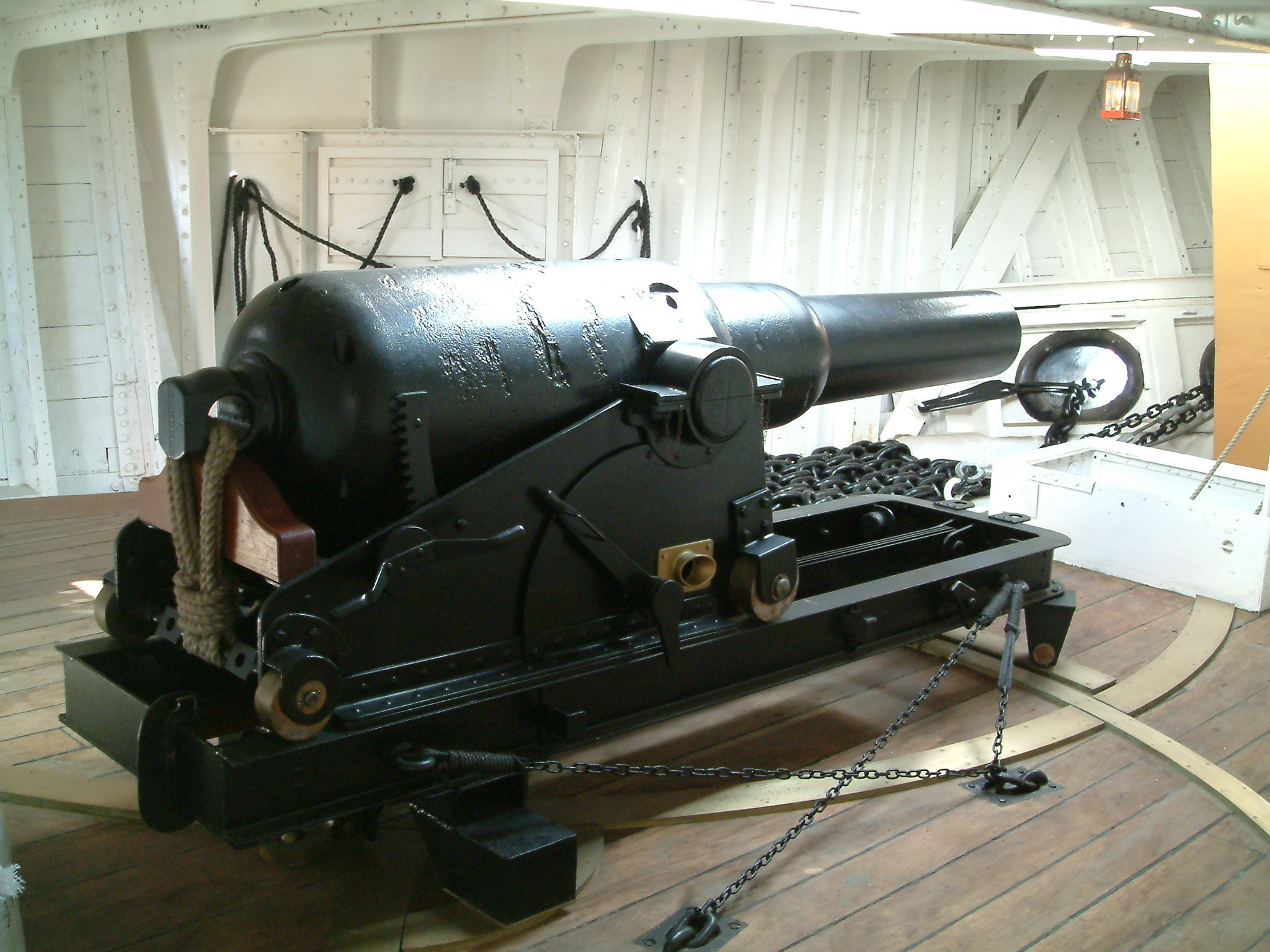
A rifled muzzle loader in the forecastle of HMS Gannet (1878)

A rifled muzzle loader (RML) is a type of artillery piece invented in the mid-19th century. In contrast to smooth bore cannon which preceded it, the rifling of the gun barrel allowed much greater range, accuracy and penetration as the spin induced to the shell gave it directional stability. During the 1860s and 1870s, rifled muzzle loaders were used as field guns, naval guns, and fortress guns, until they were superseded by effective and reliable breech-loading weapons.

In naval service, the rifled muzzle loader and the concurrent rifled breech loader (RBL) generated a huge arms race in the late 19th century, with rapid advances in fortifications and ironclad warships.

== Service History ==
The first RML to enter active service was the La Hitte canon de 4 rayé (4kg cannon - rifled), which made its debut with the French Army in Italy in the spring of 1859. The new gun demonstrated a massive improvement in range and accuracy compared to the Austrian smoothbore weapons, and so in the decade which followed, all western armies began to adopt rifled artillery.

The armies and navies of the American Civil War used a wide variety of rifled artillery throughout the conflict, alongside traditional smoothbores. The most common rifles were the 3-inch ordnance rifle and the 10-pounder Parrott rifle. The Union navy made extensive use of Dahlgren guns, many of which were rifled.

Rifled Muzzle Loaders remained in service with the French Army into the 1870s, with the La Hitte providing the main artillery piece during the Franco-Prussian War, in contrast to the Prussian breech-loading Krupp guns.

The British Army did not initially adopt RML weapons, instead pursuing the breech-loading Armstrong gun. However, concerns about cost and the effectiveness of the Armstrong guns led to them being replaced in 1871 by the technically simpler (and therefore cheaper) RML 9-pounder, which remained the army's primary field gun until the adoption of the BL 12-pounder 7 cwt in 1885.

During the 1870s, advances were made in gun metallurgy and design which made breech loaders more effective and reliable, leading to the eventual abandonment of muzzle loaders by most armies. In particular, the development of practical steel gun-founding by the Krupp company increased the strength of the breech area, and the perfection of the Obturating ring by Charles Ragon de Bange increased ranges by reducing gas leakage from around the breech block.

== Royal Navy experience ==
The largest rifled muzzle-loader carried on a warship was the 17.7-inch, 100-ton Elswick of the 1870s, four of which were installed in each of the Italian battleships Duilio and Enrico Dandolo (launched in 1872). The Royal Navy at the time was restricted to the weapons produced by Woolwich Arsenal, so that the heaviest guns that could be shipped were the 80-ton 16-inch guns of HMS Inflexible.

Introduction of the Armstrong rifled breechloaders (RBL) into the Royal Navy in 1860 was not very successful. The action of Kagoshima on 14 August 1863 led to 28 accidents in 365 rounds fired. Following this experience, the Royal Navy reverted to the muzzle-loader until the early 1880s. Other navies, notably France, continued to develop and deploy RBLs, but they were hardly superior in rate of fire or muzzle energy to their British counterparts.

During this period rapid burning black powder was used as the propellant, and the guns had a stubby, 'soda bottle' shape giving easy access to either end for loading. The RBLs of the time were notably weaker in the breech region, and more prone to failure.

A catastrophic accident on board HMS Thunderer in January 1879, in which a 35-ton 12-inch muzzle-loader hung fire (misfired) and was subsequently double-loaded, killing eleven sailors, motivated the Admiralty to re-consider the RBL.

Improvements in breech mechanisms in the period 1860 to 1880, together with the introduction of 60 lb (27 kg) "R.L.G." rifle large grain powder caused the Navy to re-adopt the RBL as the new powder required longer barrels which could not be withdrawn into the turret for loading. A new 12-inch gun was developed for HMS Edinburgh in 1879, but burst during trials. Following modifications the new weapon proved reliable.

== See also ==
- Muzzle-loading rifle
- Parrott rifle
- Brooke rifle
- James rifle
