= SMS Blitz (1882) =

Aviso of the German Imperial Navy

- Blitz in the 1880s or 1890s

History

German Empire
- Name: Blitz
- Builder: Norddeutsche Schiffbau-Gesellschaft, Kiel
- Laid down: 1881
- Launched: 26 August 1882
- Commissioned: 28 March 1883
- Stricken: 8 March 1921
- Fate: Scrapped, 1921

General characteristics
- Class & type: Blitz-class aviso
- Displacement: Design: 1,381 t (1,359 long tons); Full load: 1,486 t (1,463 long tons)
- Length: 78.43 m (257 ft 4 in) o/a
- Beam: 9.90 m (32 ft 6 in)
- Draft: 4.22 m (13 ft 10 in)
- Installed power: 8 × locomotive boilers; 2,700 PS (2,700 ihp)
- Propulsion: 2 × double-expansion steam engines; 2 × screw propellers
- Speed: 15.7 knots (29.1 km/h; 18.1 mph)
- Range: 2,440 nmi (4,520 km; 2,810 mi) at 9 knots (17 km/h; 10 mph)
- Complement: 7 officers; 127 enlisted men
- Armament: 1 × 12.5 cm (4.9 in) K L/23 gun; 4 × 8.7 cm (3.4 in) K L/23 guns; 1 × 35 cm (13.8 in) torpedo tube

SMS Blitz was an aviso of the German Kaiserliche Marine (Imperial Navy) built in the early 1880s. She was the lead ship of her class, which included one other vessel, SMS Pfeil. Her primary offensive armament consisted of a bow-mounted torpedo tube, and she was armed with a battery of light guns to defend herself against torpedo boats, a sign of the growing importance of torpedoes as effective weapons in the period. The Blitz class featured a number of innovations in German warship design: they were the first steel hulled warships and the first cruiser-type ships to discard traditional sailing rigs.

For much of her career, Blitz served as a flotilla leader for groups of torpedo boats. In the 1880s, these duties included conducting demonstrations of torpedo boat capabilities under the direction of Alfred von Tirpitz, then the head of torpedo development in the German Navy, who frequently used Blitz as his flagship. She also made numerous trips abroad, including several occasions escorting members of the House of Hohenzollern on visits to Britain, Russia, and elsewhere. By the 1890s, she began to be used in a variety of secondary roles in addition to her normal duties, including as a fisheries protection vessel, a training ship, and a tender. She began to operate as a dedicated tender for various units in the German fleet in the early 1900s.

The ship's activities during World War I are unclear, with one historian stating she was employed as a coastal defense vessel until 1915 and then as a tender until the end of the war in 1918, and another trio of historians who state that she remained in service as a tender for the fleet's battleships through 1917, took part in Operation Albion in the Baltic Sea in October 1917, and was slated to participate in Operation Schlußstein, the occupation of St. Petersburg, Russia in August 1918 before the operation was cancelled. Blitz was struck from the naval register in March 1921 and subsequently broken up.

== Design ==
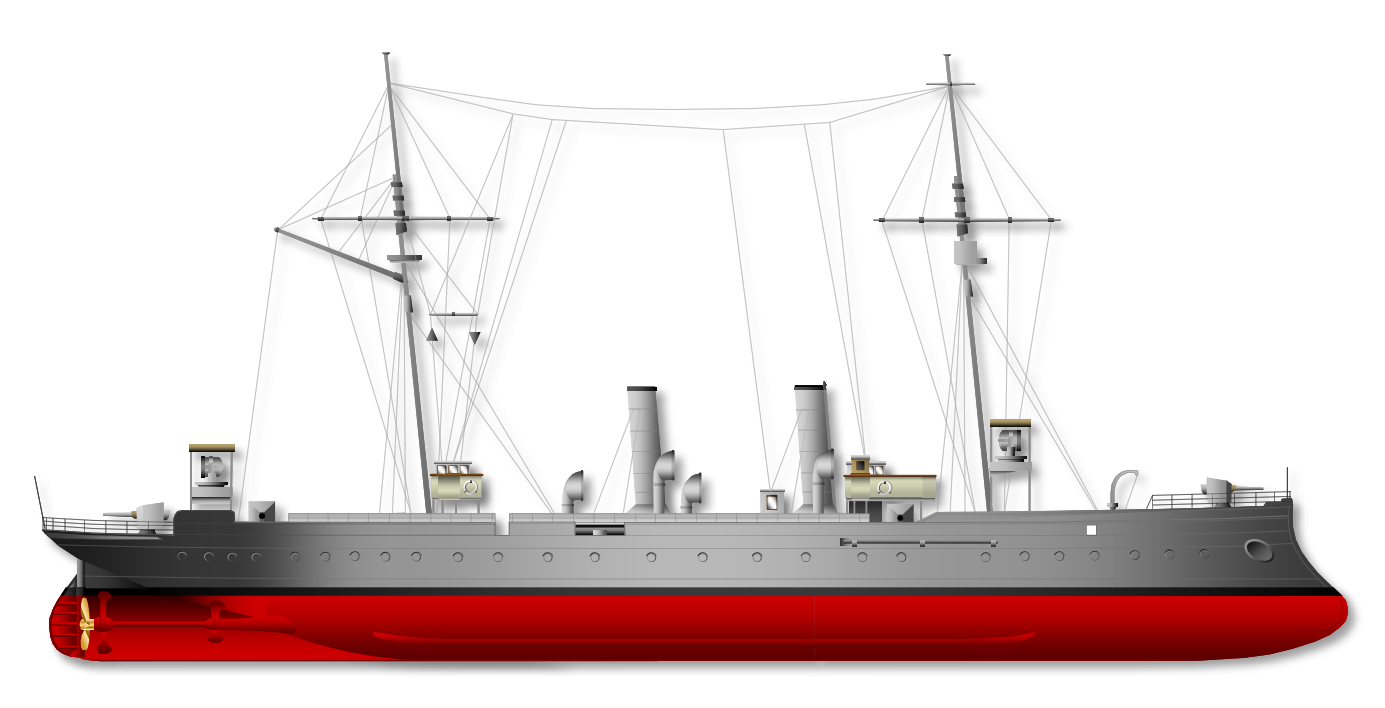
Illustration of Blitz

Designed in 1879, the Blitz-class avisos marked a significant advance in naval technology for the German fleet; they were the first steel-hulled vessels, and they were the first cruiser-type vessels to abandon traditional sailing masts. Their armament—a torpedo tube and a battery of light guns—reflected the growing importance of the torpedo as a weapon, since the guns were necessary to defend against the increasingly powerful torpedo boats of the period.

Blitz was 78.43 meters (257 ft 4 in) long overall and had a beam of 9.90 m (32 ft 6 in) and a maximum draft of 4.07 m (13 ft 4 in) forward. She displaced 1,381 metric tons (1,359 long tons) as designed and up to 1,486 metric tons (1,463 long tons; 1,638 short tons) at full combat load. She and her sister ship were the first steel-hulled warships of the German fleet. Blitz had a crew of 7 officers and 127 enlisted men.

Her propulsion system consisted of two horizontal 2-cylinder double expansion engines. Steam for the engines was provided by eight coal-fired locomotive boilers. The ship's propulsion system was rated for 2,700 metric horsepower (2,700 ihp) and provided a top speed of 15.7 knots (29.1 km/h; 18.1 mph) and a range of approximately 2,440 nautical miles (4,520 km; 2,810 mi) at 9 knots (17 km/h; 10 mph).

As built, the ship was armed with one 12.5 cm (4.9 in) K L/23 gun placed in a pivot mount. The gun was supplied with 100 rounds of ammunition. The ship was also equipped with four 8.7 cm (3.4 in) K L/23 guns, also in single pivot mounts and one 35 cm (13.8 in) torpedo tube mounted in the bow. In 1892–1893, the ship was rearmed with six 8.8 cm (3.5 in) SK L/30 pattern quick-firing guns in single mounts and three 35 cm torpedo tubes, one in the bow and one on each broadside, all submerged in the hull. She carried no armor protection.

== Service history ==
=== Construction – 1887 ===
Blitz in Kiel in the late 1880s or early 1890s

Blitz was laid down at the Norddeutsche Schiffbau-Gesellschaft (North German Shipbuilding Company) shipyard in Kiel in mid-1881 under the contract name "D". (Note: German warships were ordered under provisional names. Additions to the fleet were given a single letter; ships intended to replace older or lost vessels were ordered as "Ersatz (name of the ship to be replaced)".) She was launched on 26 August 1882 and commissioned on 28 March 1883 to begin sea trials. Initial testing lasted until 30 April and design defects that were discovered during the trials necessitated corrections at the shipyard. A second round of trials were held between 24 July and 15 December, after which she was decommissioned. The ship was recommissioned on 22 April 1884 and assigned to the armored division to serve as the unit's aviso. The ships conducted training maneuvers in the North and Baltic Seas that year, and from 20 to 24 December, they visited Frederikshavn, Denmark during a cruise through the Kattegat and Skagerrak for a test of torpedo boat endurance.

The ship spent the first half on 1885 as the aviso for the fleet's ironclads, but beginning on 21 July, she joined the torpedo boat flotillas, serving as the flagship of I Torpedo-boat Division; the ship's commander, Kapitänleutnant (KL—Captain Lieutenant) Hugo Zeye also served as the divisional commander. From 6 to 22 August, Blitz led the division on a cruise to Trondheim, Norway as another demonstration of torpedo boats' ability to operate at sea. During the summer maneuvers in August and September, she led her torpedo boats with an armored warship division composed of Bayern, Friedrich Carl, and Hansa, and an unarmored division that comprised three old sail corvettes and Pfeil. At the time, Alfred von Tirpitz, the future architect of the High Seas Fleet, was the Deputy for Torpedo Matters for the Kaiserliche Admiralität (Imperial Admiralty), and he directed the exercises conducted by the torpedo flotillas. He used Blitz as his flagship during this period. Starting in March 1886, Tirpitz led the flotilla on training exercises that lasted until July. Thereafter, Blitz and her accompanying torpedo boats joined the annual fleet maneuvers as III Division.

Following the conclusion of the maneuvers in September, Blitz and the flotilla visited Christiana, Norway. On the way back, Blitz accidentally rammed the British steamer Oakland on 10 September; she was able to rescue only two crewmen from Oakland before she sank. Blitz suffered minor damage, which necessitated repairs in Kiel. After repairs were completed, she joined the fleet for maneuvers that lasted until 23 September. She was decommissioned on 27 October for the winter and returned to service on 4 May 1886. She again served as the flagship of the torpedo boat flotilla for the year, which concluded with the annual autumn maneuvers in September. She was again withdrawn from service on 4 October in Kiel.

Blitz was recommissioned on 27 April 1887, again with Tirpitz aboard. She was present for the ceremonial start of construction of the Kaiser Wilhelm Canal in Kiel, after which she steamed around Denmark to Wilhelmshaven. There, she embarked Princes Wilhelm and Heinrich and took them to Britain for the Golden Jubilee of their grandmother Queen Victoria on 20 June. Blitz and the torpedo boats made a favorable impression on observers at the Cowes Regatta, though Wilhelm's complaints about the British doctor treating his terminally-ill father Kaiser Friedrich III achieved the opposite effect for the soon-to-be kaiser. Blitz and the torpedo boats left Britain on 26 June and arrived in Kiel two days later. Training exercises were then held in the Baltic and North Seas, during which Blitz and the torpedo boats formed IV Division, and on 28 September she was decommissioned.

=== 1888–1899 ===
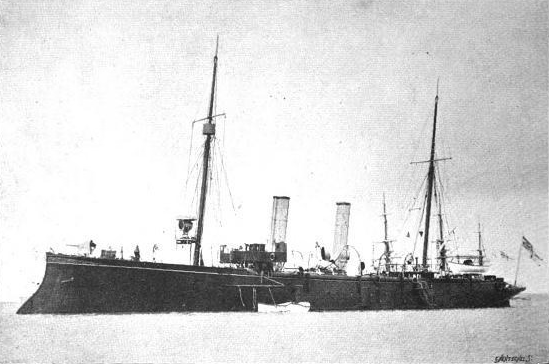
Blitz in port, c. 1895

The year 1888 followed the same routine of training exercises in previous years, though now she operated with III Flotilla. In July, she accompanied the fleet that the newly crowned Kaiser Wilhelm II on a state visit to Tsar Alexander III of Russia from 14 to 31 July. The voyage also included stops in Sweden and Denmark. During the August–September fleet maneuvers, she led the fourteen torpedo boats of III Flotilla as part of a squadron defending Wilhelmshaven from a simulated hostile squadron; she led the torpedo boats in a mock attack on the fleet. Blitz was decommissioned in late September; the outbreak of the Abushiri revolt in German East Africa prompted the navy to consider sending Blitz to join the East Africa Squadron, but the proposal was abandoned. She remained in German waters in 1889, conducting training maneuvers with the torpedo boats in July and escorting Wilhelm II on a voyage to Britain in mid-September. She was present for a torpedo demonstration that involved the sinking of the old gunboat Drache.

The year 1890 passed without incident; Blitz escorted Wilhelm II on a visit to Norway and she was present for the ceremonial transfer of the island of Helgoland from British to German control (by way of the Heligoland–Zanzibar Treaty). The year's fleet maneuvers that August–September followed a similar arrangement to the previous year's, with Blitz and the torpedo boats defending Germany's Baltic coast against a simulated Russian blockade. During the 1891 training year, the torpedo-boat flotilla was joined by the Training Squadron for exercises. Blitz was used to train boiler room personnel in 1892, and over the winter of 1892–1893, the ship was modernized with new quick-firing guns. Her conning tower and chart house were relocated, along with other alterations to the ship. She was recommissioned on 1 July 1893, and from 17 to 24 July she accompanied the Kaiser's yacht Hohenzollern on a cruise to Gotland, followed immediately by another visit to the Cowes Regatta from 27 July to 10 August. She was decommissioned on arrival in Kiel on 18 August.

Blitz initially served as a training ship for boiler room crews in 1894, and beginning on 18 April she became the flotilla leader for I Flotilla. During a night attack practice in late July, Pfeil and the torpedo boat D4 accidentally collided and Blitz had to tow the torpedo boat back to port. During the 1894 maneuvers, which postulated a two-front war against France and Russia, Blitz remained in the Baltic to defend against the simulated Russian attack. The next year followed the same pattern and passed without incident until August, when she was relieved as the flotilla leader by D2. Blitz thereafter served as the tender for the artillery training ship Mars for the rest of 1895. In 1896, the ship served as a flotilla leader and later as a dispatch boat for the corvette Blücher, which served as the fleet flagship during training exercises that year. She was present for the naval review held for Tsar Nicholas II of Russia during his visit to Kiel that August.

The ship served as a tender for the pre-dreadnought battleship Kurfürst Friedrich Wilhelm, the flagship of I Squadron in 1897. During the summer maneuvers that year, Blitz and Pfeil served in the simulated hostile squadron. She spent most of 1898 as a training vessel, though she was briefly used as a squadron tender. The ship was assigned to the Naval Artillery Inspectorate and was used to train auto-cannon crews from February to April 1899. Beginning on 16 September, she was employed as a fishery protection vessel, along with the old aviso Zieten. During this period, she patrolled off the mouth of the Humber, the Dogger Bank, and in the southern North Sea. She returned to Kiel on 26 November and thereafter reverted to the Naval Artillery Inspectorate.

=== 1900–1921 ===
Blitz or Pfeil at sea c. 1914

She performed fishery protection duties in 1900 until 14 April, when she returned to the torpedo boat flotillas. During training maneuvers on 10 May, the torpedo boat S71 struck Blitz and seriously damaged her rudder, forcing her to go to the Kaiserliche Werft (Imperial Shipyard) in Kiel for repairs. She served as a scout for the Maneuver Fleet during the autumn exercises that lasted from 15 August to 15 September. She operated as part of the simulated German fleet under the command of Admiral Wilhelm Büchsel Following the conclusion of the exercises, she was decommissioned in Kiel on 22 September. She was moved to the Kaiserliche Werft in Danzig for a thorough overhaul that included the installation of new boilers; work lasted until early 1903. She was recommissioned on 25 April, thereafter joining the fleet's scouting unit on 2 May. She steamed with the fleet on a major training cruise into the Atlantic in July and August, during which she was used as a dispatch boat and a squadron tender. Beginning on 25 September, she became a tender for the fleet's battleships, a role she filled for the next fifteen years. She initially served with the fleet flagship, Kaiser Wilhelm II.

In 1904, Blitz was transferred support the battleships of I Battle Squadron, though during the summer training exercises she reverted to Kaiser Wilhelm II. She joined the fleet for a cruise to the Shetland Islands and Norway, after which she had to return to the shipyard in Kiel on 1 September for repairs to her engines and boilers, which had suffered breakdowns during the cruise. The work was completed quickly and she was able to take part in the autumn maneuvers that year. The year 1905 followed the same routine, with the ship alternating between I Squadron and Kaiser Wilhelm II, though she also served temporarily with the scouting unit. She was present for a cruise to Norway in 1906, along with a fleet review in Hamburg involving the German Flottenverein (Navy League) from 29 April to 20 May. The years 1907, 1908, and 1909 passed uneventfully and Blitz remained in Germany during the fleet cruises to the Atlantic and to Spain in those years.

In need of another overhaul by 1910, Blitz went into dry dock at the Kaiserliche Werft in Danzig for repairs that lasted from 30 April to 1 August. She was transferred from the list of cruisers to the list of special ships on 8 December. She was reassigned to Wilhelmshaven for her home port in 1911, but she was damaged on the way, requiring repairs in Danzig that were completed by early 1912. She finally arrived at her new home port on 1 April. She saw little activity in 1913 and remained in port when the fleet made its annual summer cruise to Norway. She was present at the ceremonies at Düne, Helgoland on 23 May for the unveiling of a memorial to the crews of the torpedo boats G171 and S178, the transport vessel Unterelbe, and the zeppelin L 1, the latter having been lost in the Helgoland Island air disaster the previous year. Blitz and Pfeil carried observers from Cuxhaven to Helgoland and back. The ship accompanied the fleet on its cruise to Norway from 6 to 25 June, which included stops in Odda and Balestrand.

The ship's activities during World War I are unclear; according to the historian Erich Gröner, Blitz was mobilized for coastal defense patrols in August, serving in this capacity until 1915 when she reverted to tender duties. Gröner states that she saw no other use until the end of the war. The historians Hans Hildebrand, Albert Röhr, and Hans-Otto Steinmetz disagree, stating that she remained in her tender role for I Squadron for the first three years of the war, before serving in the fleet that conducted Operation Albion—the amphibious assault on the islands in the Gulf of Riga—in October 1917. They also note that she was slated to take part in Operation Schlußstein, the planned occupation of St. Petersburg, Russia, in August 1918. The other ships included in the special unit created to carry the operation out included the battleships Nassau, Ostfriesland, and Thüringen. The ships entered the Baltic on 10 August but the operation was postponed and then cancelled, with the special unit being dissolved on 21 August. Both agree that she was struck from the naval register on 8 March 1921 and then broken up in Wilhelmshaven.
