= Blitz-class aviso =

Aviso class of the German Imperial Navy

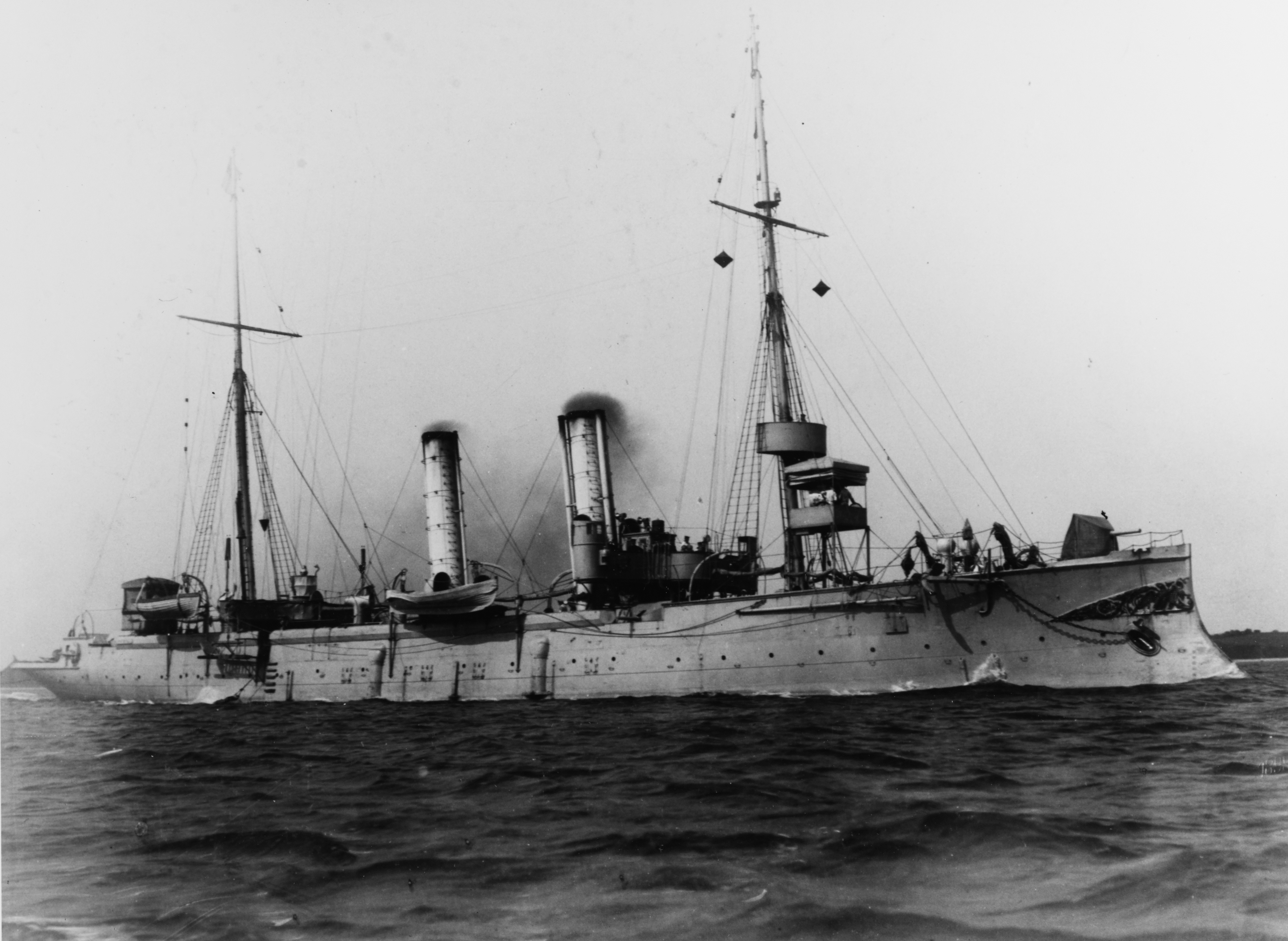
- Pfeil in 1899

Class overview
- Operators: Imperial German Navy
- Preceded by: SMS Zieten
- Succeeded by: SMS Greif
- Built: 1881–84
- In service: 1883–1922
- Completed: 2
- Retired: 2

General characteristics
- Type: Aviso
- Displacement: Design: 1,381 t (1,359 long tons); Full load: 1,486 t (1,463 long tons)
- Length: 78.43 m (257 ft 4 in) o/a
- Beam: 9.90 m (32 ft 6 in)
- Draft: 4.22 m (13 ft 10 in)
- Installed power: 8 × locomotive boilers; 2,700 PS (2,700 ihp)
- Propulsion: 2 × double-expansion steam engines; 2 × screw propellers
- Speed: 15.7 knots (29.1 km/h; 18.1 mph)
- Range: 2,440 nmi (4,520 km; 2,810 mi) at 9 knots (17 km/h; 10 mph)
- Complement: 7 officers; 127 enlisted men
- Armament: 1 × 12.5 cm (4.9 in) K L/23 gun; 4 × 8.7 cm (3.4 in) K L/23 guns; 1 × 35 cm (13.8 in) torpedo tube

The Blitz class was a pair of avisos built for the German Kaiserliche Marine (Imperial Navy) in the early 1880s. The ships, Blitz and Pfeil, were the first steel-hulled ships of any kind built by the German Navy, were among the first torpedo cruiser type warships in the world, and were the progenitors of the later light cruisers of the Gazelle class. They were armed with a 12.5 cm (4.9 in) gun and one 35 cm (13.8 in) torpedo tube as their principal armament, and were capable of a top speed in excess of 15 knots (28 km/h; 17 mph). They were very successful warships, remaining in active service for more than three decades.

Blitz and Pfeil served extensively in various roles; Blitz spent much of her career as a flotilla leader for torpedo boats, while Pfeil served with the training squadron and the main fleet. Pfeil was deployed to German East Africa in 1889 to suppress the Abushiri revolt, returning to Germany in 1890. Throughout the 1890s, the ships served with the fleet, conducting a yearly routine of exercises and training cruises. They served in a variety of additional roles during the 1890s and 1900s, including as tenders, fishery protection vessels, and training ships. They operated as dedicated tenders to the battle squadrons of the High Seas Fleet by the mid-1900s, filling that role through the start of World War I. Blitz took part in Operation Albion in the Baltic Sea in late 1917 and Pfeil was later used as a training ship for U-boat crews. The ships were discarded in the early 1920s and broken up for scrap.

== Design ==
Designed in 1879, the design specifications for the Blitz-class avisos called for a top speed of 17 knots (31 km/h; 20 mph) from about 2,500 metric horsepower (2,500 ihp), though the finalized design had a top speed of a knot less. The ships marked a significant advance in naval technology for the German fleet; they were the first steel-hulled vessels, and they were the first cruiser-type vessels to abandon traditional sailing masts. Their armament—a torpedo tube and a battery of light guns—reflected the growing importance of the torpedo as a weapon, since the torpedo tube served as its primary offensive armament and the guns were necessary to defend against the increasingly powerful torpedo boats of the period.

At the time of their completion, they were among the earliest torpedo cruisers in the world. The Blitz-class avisos were the first step toward creating the modern, steel-hulled light cruiser, and their modern appearance presaged later developments. Development of the aviso type would ultimately come to fruition in the Gazelle-class light cruisers, built a decade later. The Blitz design proved to be an effective one, as evidenced by the fact that Blitz remained in active service for thirty-five years.

=== General characteristics ===
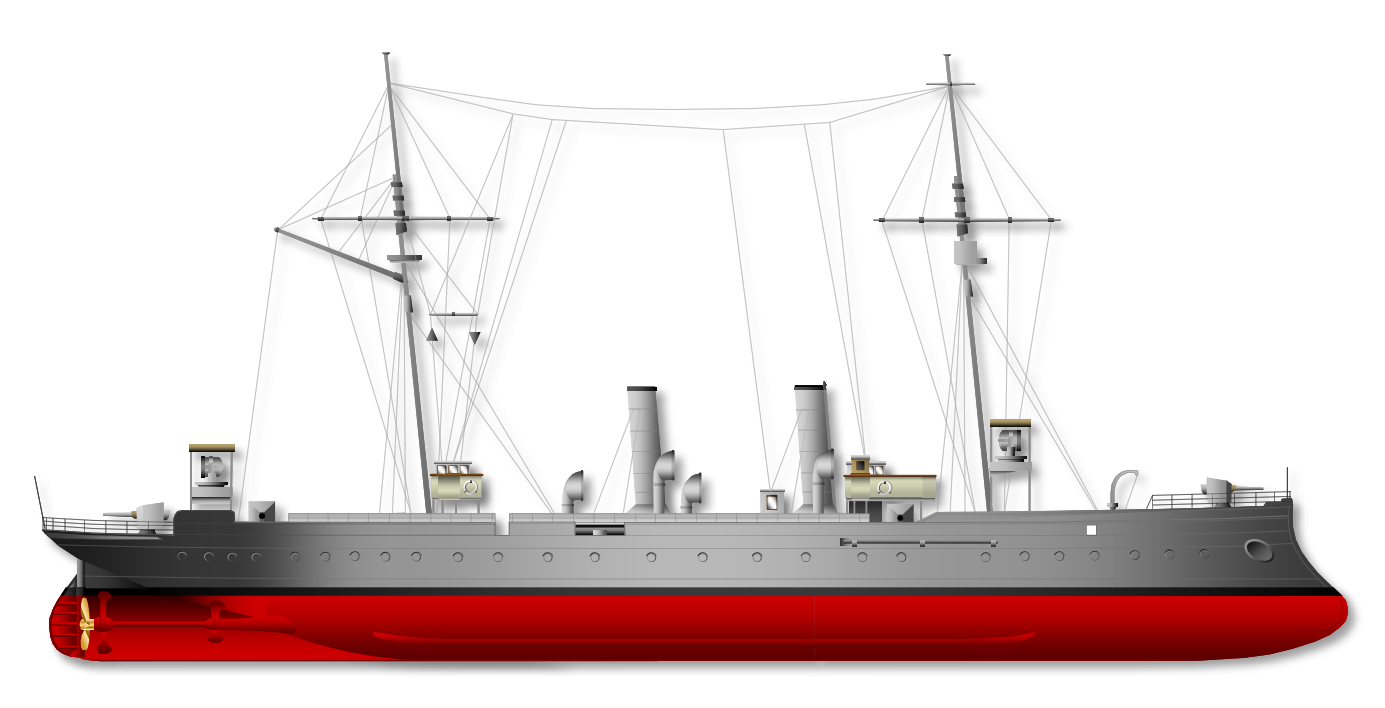
Illustration of the Blitz class

The Blitz-class ships were 75.30 meters (247 ft 1 in) long at the waterline and 78.43 m (257 ft 4 in) long overall. They had a beam of 9.90 m (32 ft 6 in) and a maximum draft of 4.07 m (13 ft 4 in) forward. The ships displaced 1,381 metric tons (1,359 long tons) as designed and up to 1,486 t (1,463 long tons) at full combat load. The ships' hulls were constructed with transverse and longitudinal steel frames, and contained eleven watertight compartments. A double bottom was located beneath the ships' engine rooms.

Blitz and Pfeil had a crew of 7 officers and 127 enlisted men, though this number was later revised to 6 officers and 135 sailors. When serving as torpedo boat flotilla leaders, the ships had an additional 3 officers and 16 enlisted men. The ships carried several smaller boats, including one picket boat, one yawl, and one dinghy. Later in their careers, a cutter, another yawl, and another dinghy were added.

=== Machinery ===
The ships' propulsion system consisted of two horizontal 2-cylinder double expansion engines in a single engine room. The engines drove a pair of 3-bladed screws. Steam for the engines was provided by eight coal-fired locomotive boilers. After refits in the early 1890s, the ships' boilers were replaced with newer, more efficient models; Blitz received eight transverse cylindrical boilers, while Pfeil had eight cylindrical boilers installed. The ships were supplied with electrical power with a single 10-kilowatt (13 hp) generator that operated at 67 volts. As built, the ships were fitted with a schooner rig with a sail area of 591 square meters (6,360 sq ft) to supplement her steam engines, but this was later reduced to a rig of auxiliary sails with an area of 282 m^{2} (3,040 sq ft), and the sails were removed entirely by 1900.

The propulsion system was rated at 2,700 metric horsepower (2,700 ihp), for a top speed of 16 knots (30 km/h; 18 mph). Neither ship reached this speed on trials; Blitz managed 15.7 knots (29.1 km/h; 18.1 mph), and Pfeil made 15.6 knots (28.9 km/h; 18.0 mph). The ships carried up to 220 t (220 long tons; 240 short tons) of coal, which allowed them to steam for approximately 2,440 nautical miles (4,520 km; 2,810 mi) at a cruising speed of 9 knots (17 km/h; 10 mph). Steering was controlled with one rudder.

=== Armament ===
Blitz in port early in her career

As built, the Blitz-class avisos were armed with one 12.5 cm (4.9 in) K L/23 gun placed in a pivot mount atop the bow. The gun was supplied with 100 rounds of ammunition. The ships were also equipped with four 8.7 cm K L/23 guns in single mounts and one 35 cm (13.8 in) torpedo tube mounted in the bow above the waterline. In 1891 and 1892, the ships were rearmed with six 8.8 cm SK L/30 guns in single mounts; these were carried one on the bow, one on the stern, and two amidships on either broadside. They also received three 35 cm torpedo tubes, one in the bow and one on each broadside, all submerged in the hull. The ships did not carry any armor protection.

== Ships ==
Construction data
Ship	Builder	Laid down	Launched	Completed
Blitz	Norddeutsche Schiffbau-Gesellschaft, Kiel	1881	26 August 1882	28 March 1883
Pfeil	Kaiserliche Werft, Wilhelmshaven	1881	16 September 1882	25 November 1884

== Service history ==
Pfeil at sea c. 1914

Upon entering service, Blitz served as the flotilla leader for I Torpedo-boat Flotilla; at the time, Alfred von Tirpitz, the future architect of the High Seas Fleet, directed the operations of the navy's torpedo craft, and Blitz was involved in evaluations of torpedo boat capabilities in the early 1880s. These included tests to demonstrate the ability of the boats to operate away from sheltered, coastal waters and weapons tests. Pfeil initially served with the training squadron until late 1889, when she was deployed to German East Africa to help suppress the Abushiri revolt. She helped to enforce a blockade of the colony and also took part in operations against rebel forces, sending men ashore and bombarding enemy troops. In the 1890s, both ships operated with the fleet, Blitz with the torpedo boats and Pfeil as a scout for the capital ships. During this period, they routinely took part in the yearly training routine that consisted of flotilla and squadron exercises and culminated in the annual fleet maneuvers held every August and September. They also frequently escorted members of the royal family, including Kaiser Wilhelm II, who cruised aboard his yacht Hohenzollern.

By the mid-1890s, both ships began to take on secondary duties, including fishery protection patrols to prevent foreign fishing boats from violating German territorial waters, acting as tenders, and serving as training ships, although they continued to serve as active units in the fleet. The ships were involved in a number of accidents over the course of their careers, each sinking a merchant ship in accidental collisions. Both ships were assigned as dedicated tenders to I Squadron and II Squadron in the mid-1900s, and in this capacity, they accompanied the fleet's battleships on long-range cruises and continued to participate in the annual maneuvers.

Blitz and Pfeil continued to serve as tenders during World War I, though Blitz's activities during the war are unclear, as one historian reports her initially being used for coastal defense patrols, though another source states that she remained a tender through 1917, when she was sent to participate in Operation Albion against Russian forces in the Baltic Sea; she was reportedly also slated to take part in Operation Schlußstein in August 1918, also directed against Russia, but the plan was cancelled. Pfeil, meanwhile, was also used to train U-boat crews. Blitz and Pfeil were ultimately struck from the naval register in 1921 and 1922, respectively, before being broken up.
