= SMS Pfeil (1882) =

Aviso of the German Imperial Navy

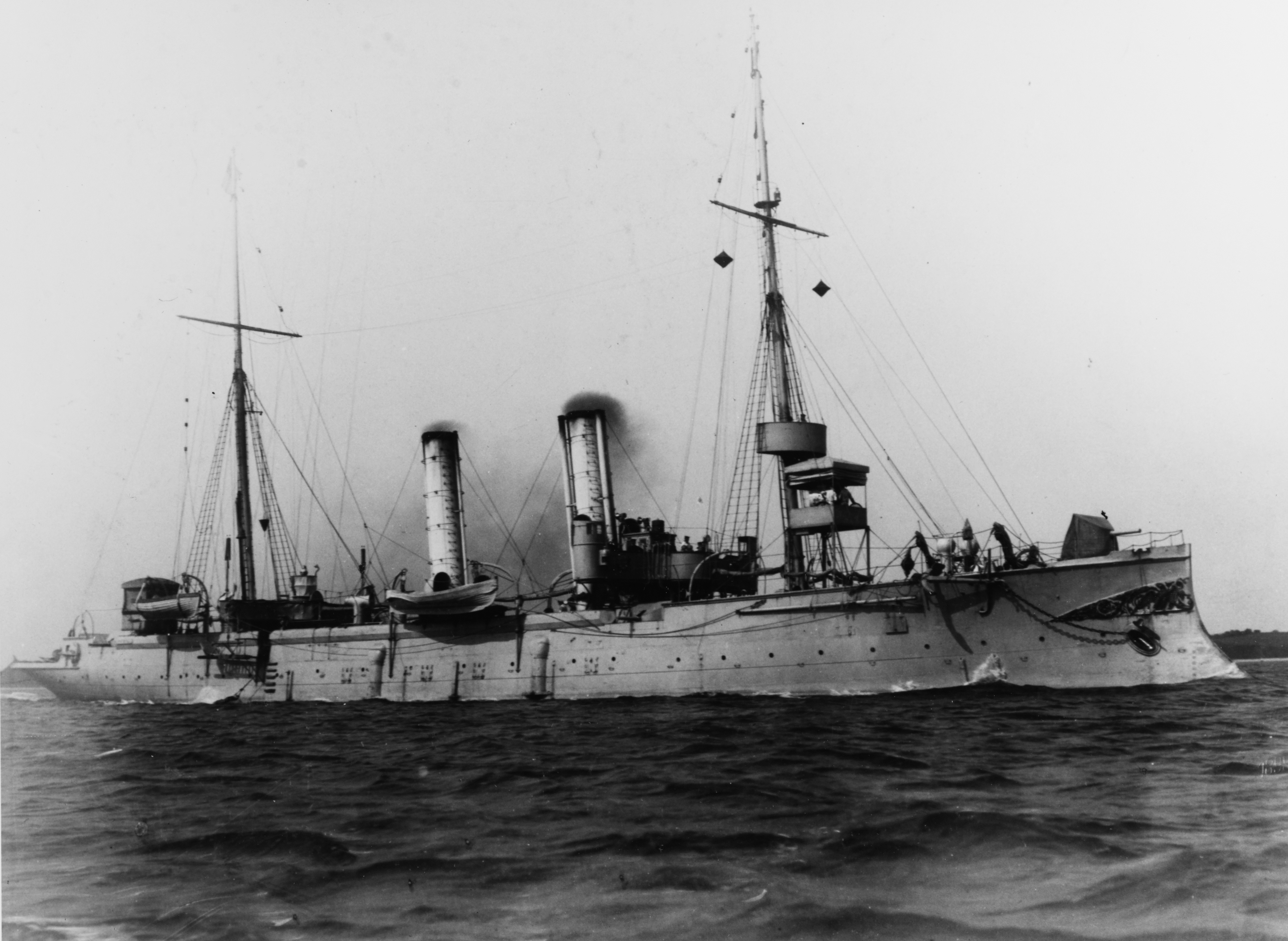
- Pfeil in 1899

History

German Empire
- Name: Pfeil
- Builder: Kaiserliche Werft, Wilhelmshaven
- Laid down: 1881
- Launched: 16 September 1882
- Commissioned: 25 November 1884
- Decommissioned: 17 December 1918
- Stricken: 16 February 1922
- Fate: Scrapped, 1922

General characteristics
- Class & type: Blitz-class aviso
- Displacement: Design: 1,381 t (1,359 long tons); Full load: 1,486 t (1,463 long tons)
- Length: 78.43 m (257 ft 4 in) o/a
- Beam: 9.90 m (32 ft 6 in)
- Draft: 4.22 m (13 ft 10 in)
- Installed power: 8 × locomotive boilers; 2,700 PS (2,700 ihp)
- Propulsion: 2 × double-expansion steam engines; 2 × screw propellers
- Speed: 15.7 knots (29.1 km/h; 18.1 mph)
- Range: 2,440 nmi (4,520 km; 2,810 mi) at 9 knots (17 km/h; 10 mph)
- Complement: 7 officers; 127 enlisted men
- Armament: 1 × 12.5 cm (4.9 in) K L/23 gun; 4 × 8.7 cm (3.4 in) K L/23 guns; 1 × 35 cm (13.8 in) torpedo tube

SMS Pfeil was an aviso of the Imperial German Navy, the second and final member of the Blitz class. Her primary offensive armament consisted of a bow-mounted torpedo tube, and she was armed with a battery of light guns to defend herself against torpedo boats, a sign of the growing importance of torpedoes as effective weapons in the period. The Blitz class featured a number of innovations in German warship design: they were the first steel hulled warships and the first cruiser-type ships to discard traditional sailing rigs.

Pfeil served in a variety of roles in her long career in the German fleet. She initially operated with the training squadron in the late 1880s, conducting exercises and training cruises. In late 1888, she was commissioned to reinforce the East Africa Squadron then in the midst of suppressing the Abushiri revolt against colonial rule in German East Africa. She helped to conduct a blockade of the coast, contributed men to landing parties, and bombarded rebel troops. She operated with the Maneuver Squadron through the 1890s and also saw service as a fishery protection vessel and a training ship for engine room crews.

Pfeil was involved in a number of accidents, including accidentally colliding with a lightship in 1890, a torpedo boat in 1894, and a schooner in 1898 (sinking the latter vessel). After the start of World War I in August 1914, the ship was used to support the flotilla of torpedo boats that guarded the mouth of the Elbe until June 1915, when she was withdrawn for use as a tender for the commander of the High Seas Fleet. Decommissioned in December 1918, she was struck from the naval register in February 1922 and broken up in Wilhelmshaven.

== Design ==
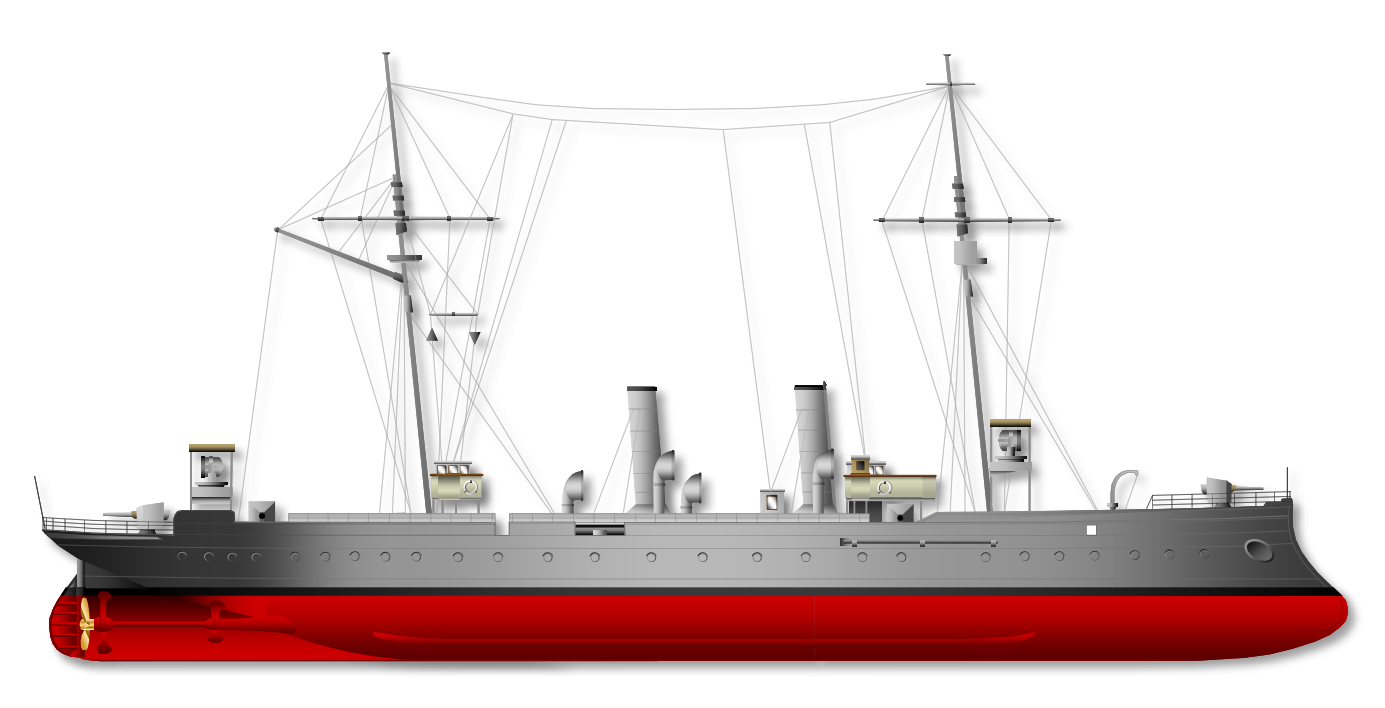
Illustration of the Blitz class

Designed in 1879, the Blitz-class avisos marked a significant advance in naval technology for the German fleet; they were the first steel-hulled vessels, and they were the first cruiser-type vessels to abandon traditional sailing masts. Their armament—a torpedo tube and a battery of light guns—reflected the growing importance of the torpedo as a weapon, since the guns were necessary to defend against the increasingly powerful torpedo boats of the period.

Pfeil was 78.43 meters (257.3 ft) long overall and had a beam of 9.9 m (32 ft) and a maximum draft of 4.07 m (13.4 ft) forward. She displaced 1,381 metric tons (1,359 long tons) as designed and up to 1,486 metric tons (1,463 long tons; 1,638 short tons) at full combat load. She and her sister ship were the first steel-hulled warships of the German fleet. Pfeil had a crew of 7 officers and 127 enlisted men.

Her propulsion system consisted of two horizontal 2-cylinder double expansion engines. Steam for the engines was provided by eight coal-fired cylindrical boilers. The ship's propulsion system was rated for 2,700 metric horsepower (2,700 ihp) and provided a top speed of 15.6 kn (28.9 km/h; 18.0 mph) and a range of approximately 2,440 nautical miles (4,520 km; 2,810 mi) at 9 kn (17 km/h; 10 mph).

As built, the ship was armed with one 12.5 cm (4.9 in) K L/23 gun placed in a pivot mount. The gun was supplied with 100 rounds of ammunition. The ship was also equipped with four 8.7 cm (3.4 in) K L/23 guns, also in single pivot mounts. Pfeil also carried one 35 cm (13.8 in) torpedo tube mounted in the bow. In 1891–1892, the ship was rearmed with six 8.8 cm (3.5 in) SK L/30 guns in single mounts and three 35 cm torpedo tubes, one in the bow and one on each broadside, all submerged in the hull. She carried no armor protection.

== Service history ==
=== Construction – 1892 ===
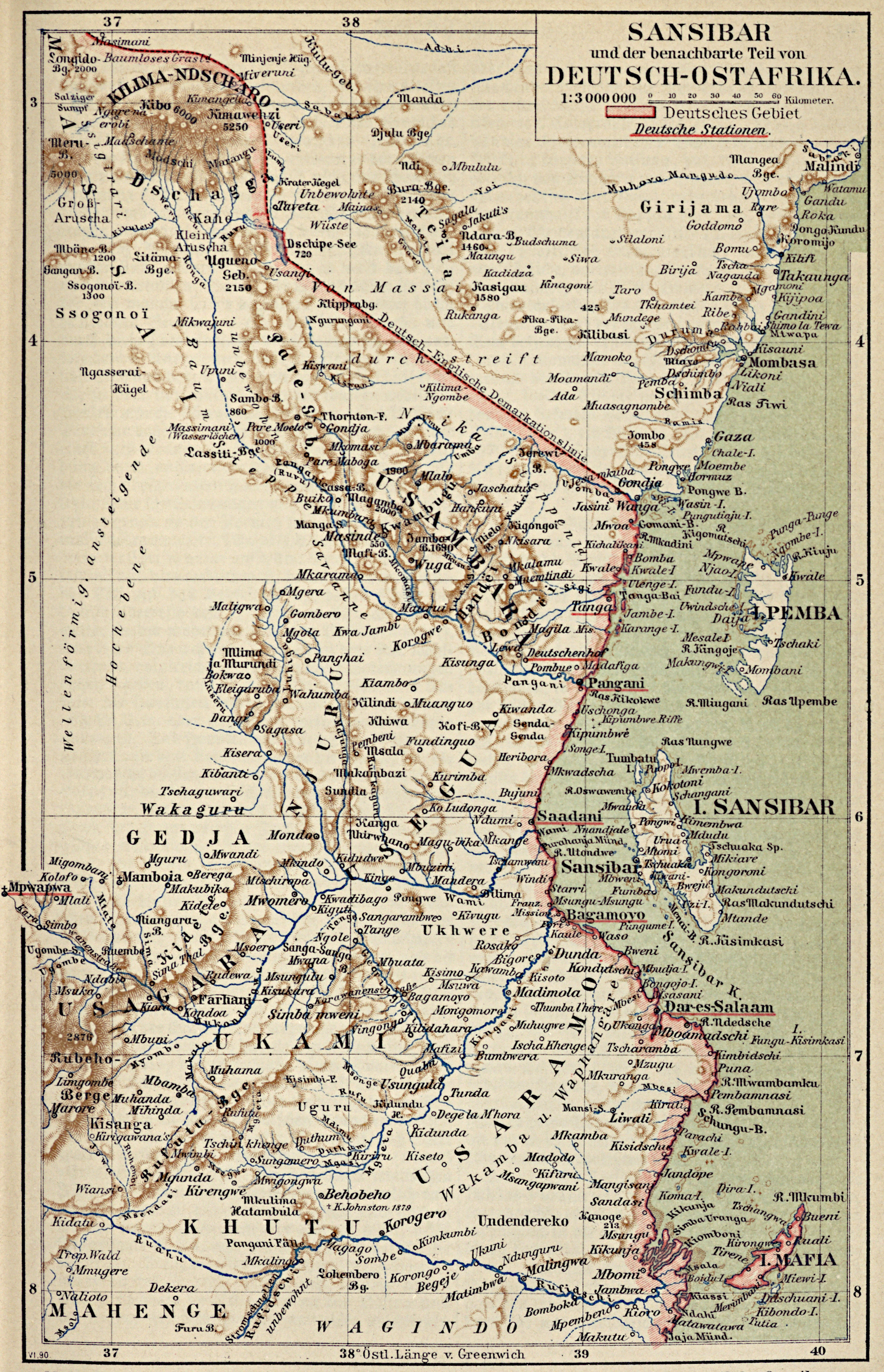
Map of German East Africa from c. 1890

Pfeil was laid down at the Kaiserliche Werft (Imperial Shipyard) in Wilhelmshaven in mid-1881, under the provisional name "Ersatz Grille". (Note: German warships were ordered under provisional names. Additions to the fleet were given a single letter; ships intended to replace older or lost vessels were ordered as "Ersatz (name of the ship to be replaced)".) She was launched on 16 September 1882, and her launching ceremony was attended by Albrecht von Stosch, the chief of the Kaiserliche Admiralität (Imperial Admiralty), and Prince Heinrich, then a Leutnant zur See (Lieutenant at Sea); Heinrich performed the christening of the ship. Pfeil was commissioned for sea trials on 25 November 1884, though these lasted just two weeks before she was decommissioned for the winter months. The ship returned to active service on 22 June 1885 to join the training squadron with its flagship, the screw corvette Stein. At that time, the squadron also included the screw corvettes Olga and Sophie. Independent division exercises took place in June, and in August, the divisions, which also included an armored division composed of several ironclads and a torpedo boat division led by Pfeil's sister ship Blitz, joined for combined fleet maneuvers that lasted until September. Pfeil spent 1886 out of commission, but she was recommissioned in 1887 for aviso duty with the Maneuver Squadron, the main unit of the German fleet at that time.

In 1888, the Abushiri revolt, a major uprising against German colonial rule in German East Africa, prompted the navy to send reinforcements to the colony. Pfeil was recommissioned on 12 November to join the unprotected cruiser Schwalbe, which were to be deployed there. While on the way, Pfeil suffered storm damage in the North Sea and had to stop in Plymouth for repairs that delayed her arrival until 4 January 1889. Upon reaching the area, she joined the East Africa Squadron, under the command of Konteradmiral Karl August Deinhard, who flew his flag in the screw corvette Leipzig. Deinhard initially ordered Pfeil to take up blockade duties along the coast from Bagamoyo to Mafia Island. On 1 March, he sent Pfeil to patrol off Zanzibar; over the course of her time on blockade duty, she inspected 411 merchant ships, the most of any warship in the unit. Leipzig, Pfeil, and Schwalbe shelled Saadani on 6 June and sent men ashore to attack rebels there. Pfeil was the first steel-hulled, unrigged warship ever sent by Germany to its African colonies, though her steel hull rendered her unsuitable to long-term deployments to the tropics, and she was detached on 29 September to return home.

While on the way back to Germany, Pfeil was ordered to join the armored division, which was on a training cruise in the Mediterranean Sea at the time. Leipzig was also instructed to join the division. Kaiser Wilhelm II was cruising with the division in his yacht Hohenzollern, and wished to be briefed by Deinhard on the situation in East Africa. Pfeil met the unit on 26 October in Piraeus, Greece, while Leipzig joined the ships off the island of Mytilene on 1 November. Hohenzollern was at that time in Constantinople in the Ottoman Empire, and she arrived five days later. Deinhard delivered his report on 6 November, after which all of the German ships steamed to Venice, Italy, where Pfeil underwent repairs. From there, she departed for Wilhelmshaven, arriving there on 6 December. She was decommissioned there on seven days later.

Pfeil was recommissioned on 1 April 1890, once again to serve as the aviso for the Maneuver Squadron. She took Admiral Max von der Goltz to make an official visit to the British Admiralty and to greet the training squadron returning from the Mediterranean. Later that year, Pfeil accompanied Hohenzollern on Wilhelm II's state visit to Christiana, Norway, followed by the ceremonial transfer of the island of Helgoland from British to German control (by way of the Heligoland–Zanzibar Treaty). While on the way back from Helgoland, she accidentally collided with the lightship at the "Elbe I" location. In October, she joined the training squadron for another cruise in the Mediterranean, which included a visit to Constantinople. The ships arrived back in Germany on 18 April 1891. During exercises in the Baltic Sea on 26 June, she assisted the armored division flagship, Baden, which had run aground in Danzig Bay. Pfeil was decommissioned on 8 March 1892 for a major overhaul.

=== 1894–1922 ===
Pfeil or Blitz at sea c. 1914

The ship was recommissioned again on 3 April 1894 for service with the Maneuver Squadron. The unit conducted major exercises in the North Sea in July, during which Pfeil collided with the torpedo boat D4. Later that year, the ship was used for fishery protection duties. In December, Pfeil escorted Wilhelm II for a visit to Sweden for celebrations marking the 300th birthday of Gustavus Adolphus of Sweden. She returned to the Maneuver Squadron on 1 January 1895; the year included six weeks of torpedo training conducted by the Torpedo Inspectorate. She was detached from the squadron on 18 December. She was used as a training ship for engine room personnel beginning on 28 August 1897, and she was employed as a scout for the fleet during the annual autumn maneuvers. Following the conclusion of the maneuvers, she was sent on 21 September to replace the aviso Zieten on fishery protection patrols in the North Sea, the latter vessel needing repairs. On 30 November, Pfeil returned to aviso duties with I Squadron, which lasted until 16 December.

She thereafter resumed training ship duties until 30 April 1898; during this period, she ran aground off Hilderum while on a training cruise though she was not damaged in the accident. On 30 April, she returned to the fleet, and while on a cruise in the western Baltic, she collided with the Dutch schooner Leentje, accidentally sinking the merchant vessel. The coastal defense ship Hagen suffered a machinery breakdown in early September, and Pfeil towed her back to Kiel for repairs. Pfeil was then decommissioned on 21 September. She returned to service on 16 March 1900 for fishery protection duties, though during this period she was temporarily attached to I Squadron for the unit's maneuvers in the North and Baltic Seas. Decommissioned in Wilhelmshaven on 29 September, she was later moved to Danzig for a major overhaul in 1903. She was recommissioned on 30 March 1904, serving as an aviso and a tender for II Squadron.

The only event of note for Pfeil in 1906 was her attendance of a large fleet review in Hamburg on 19–20 May. In November that year, she went to the Kaiserliche Werft in Danzig for another overhaul. She was recommissioned on 6 April 1907, serving as II Squadron's tender through 1910; this period passed uneventfully. She was transferred to the list of special ships on 8 December 1910. The next year, she was used to tow the damaged torpedo boat T22 to Frederikshavn, Denmark, after it was damaged during fleet training exercises on 14 March. The year 1912 passed uneventfully, and on 30 March 1913, she was transferred to the newly formed Training Squadron, remaining there until 21 April. Following the outbreak of World War I, she continued to serve as the tender for II Squadron. She was later reassigned to IV Battle Squadron. She was also used to support the harbor flotilla based in the mouth of the Elbe until 28 June 1915. Pfeill was then placed at the disposition of the command staff of the High Seas Fleet, and was also used to train U-boat crews. She towed the pre-dreadnought battleship Kaiser Barbarossa to Wilhelmshaven in June 1916. Following the end of the war, she was decommissioned on 17 December 1918. She was stricken from the naval register on 16 February 1922 and broken up for scrap at Wilhelmshaven.
