= Operation Schlußstein =

World War I military operation

Operation Schlußstein (Operation Keystone) was a German military operation, which was to be carried out towards the end of the First World War in the Baltic Sea region and in Karelia with the aim of occupying the Murman Railway.

== Background ==
After the Bolsheviks' victory in the October Revolution at the end of 1917, the unstable Russian situation caused by the civil war prompted the German Supreme Army Command to take expansive action in the East. Although the Brest-Litovsk peace treaty of spring 1918 seemed to end the war in the East, the civil war situation did not bring peace. The non-Russian peoples had been granted sovereignty by Lenin, but there were conflict in these region, especially in Finland and Ukraine. Meanwhile the Bolsheviks tried to export the revolution and establish socialist regimes in these areas.

Germany actively used this situation to their advantage, which represented a breach of the Brest Litovsk peace treaty, as a pretext for further conquest. However, it is not possible to clearly distinguish between political expansionist intentions and actual security concerns of the military regarding military intervention by the Entente and the establishment of pro-German, predictable governments instead of an unleashed revolutionary furor in the affected areas. The political goals were very heterogeneous on the German side - but the military reasons were the main reason. In this context, the occupation of the Åland Islands in March and the intervention in the Finnish Civil War in April 1918, the so-called Finnish intervention, took place. The German side was unclear about how to proceed and several scenarios were discussed between the Supreme Army Command and the Foreign Office.

At the same time as the German expansion into the northern Baltic Sea, British and French troops landed in Murmansk to protect the supplies stored there for the Russian army from looting or capture by the Red Army, to advance via the Murman railway if necessary, and to intervene on the side of the White Army in the battles against Bolsheviks and German troops.

== German considerations ==
In the summer of 1918, after several severe setbacks, the Bolsheviks' victory seemed questionable overall. The German military attaché in Moscow, Wilhelm Schubert, recommended that they join forces with the anti-Bolshevik forces. The State Secretary of the Foreign Office, Rear Admiral (ret.) Paul von Hintze, vehemently opposed this and advocated joint action with the Soviets. Thus, on the German side a very mixed picture of conflicting interests regarding future action can be observed.

== Soviet plans ==
In view of further imminent Allied landings, the Bolshevik side advocated joint action against the Murman Railway, white units in Ukraine (especially the Don Cossacks) and against General Alexeyev. The latter was again rejected by Germany.

== German plans ==
The precondition for the action against the Murman Railway was the Bolsheviks' agreement to the occupation of Kronstadt and Petrograd, which was finally accepted. The German side wanted to secure a logistic base due to the well developed railway network there, but at the same time to gain control over the Baltic fleet and the Russian power centre.

Vice Admiral Friedrich Boedicker was appointed commander of the German forces, who immediately ordered the clearing of the access roads from mines to the Gulf of Finland.

== Operation ==
Mine clearance in the Gulf of Finland began on 12 August 1918. Meanwhile, ships remained on standby in Kiel. The staff of the I. Battle Squadron, to which the ships belonged, embarked on the Small Cruiser Stralsund on 16 August and sailed to Libau, where Commander Boedicker joined them. Via Reval, Helsingfors, Narwa and Hungerburg the ship moved to Björkö Sund. Afterwards the operation was postponed due to the unclear situation on the Eastern Front. On September 9, SMS Stralsund was transferred, this time to Wilhelmshaven and disembarked again, arriving immediately in Björkö on September 16. The ship was replaced on 27 September by the old coastal defense ship Beowulf, which remained there as a stationary unit.

On 27 September the operation was abandoned due to the general military and political situation. The situation in the Balkans and the collapse of the Macedonian front led to the cessation of all offensive operations in the Baltic Sea region and on the Eastern front respectively.
