= SMS Zieten =

Aviso of the German Imperial Navy

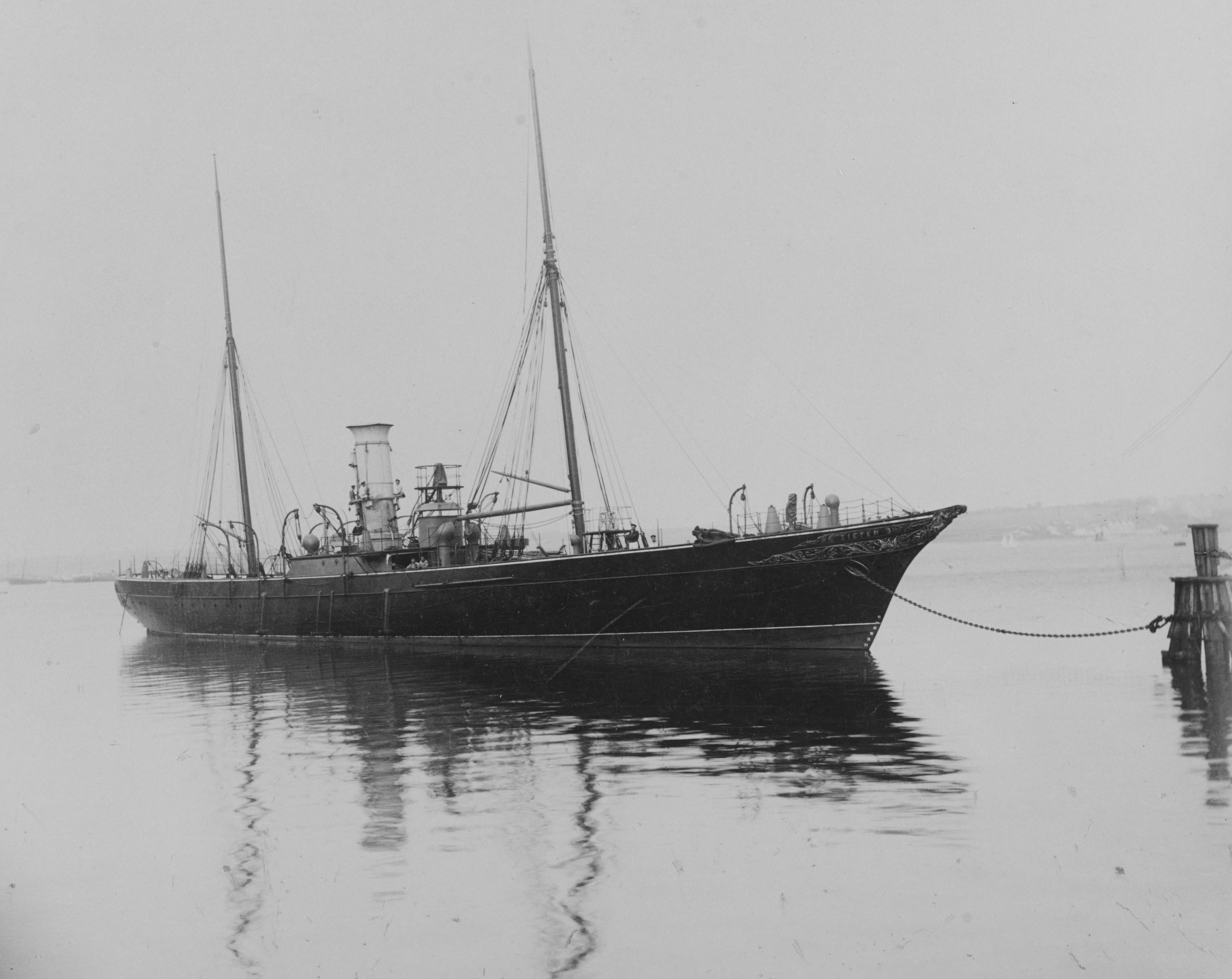
- Zieten in port

Class overview
- Preceded by: Pommerania
- Succeeded by: Blitz class

History

German Empire
- Name: Zieten
- Namesake: Hans Joachim von Zieten
- Builder: Thames Iron Works, Blackwall, London
- Laid down: 1875
- Launched: 9 March 1876
- Completed: 15 July 1876
- Commissioned: 1 August 1876
- Decommissioned: 5 July 1919
- Stricken: 6 December 1919
- Fate: Sold for scrap, 18 April 1921

General characteristics (as built)
- Type: Aviso
- Displacement: Design: 1,001 t (985 long tons; 1,103 short tons); Full load: 1,170 t (1,150 long tons; 1,290 short tons)
- Length: 79.4 m (260 ft 6 in) overall
- Beam: 8.56 m (28 ft 1 in)
- Draft: 3.8 m (12 ft 6 in)
- Installed power: 2,000 PS (1,970 ihp); 6 × fire-tube boilers
- Propulsion: 2 × screw propellers; 2 × double-expansion steam engines
- Speed: 16 knots (30 km/h; 18 mph)
- Range: 1,770 nmi (3,280 km; 2,040 mi) at 9 knots (17 km/h; 10 mph)
- Complement: 6 officers; 88 enlisted
- Armament: 2 × 38 cm (15 in) torpedo tubes

SMS Zieten was the first torpedo-armed aviso built for the Imperial German Navy (Kaiserliche Marine). She was built in Britain in 1875–1876, and was the last major warship built for Germany by a foreign shipyard. Ordered as a testbed for the new Whitehead torpedo, Zieten was armed with a pair of 38 cm (15 in) torpedo tubes, and was capable of a top speed of 16 knots (30 km/h; 18 mph), making her the fastest ship in the German fleet at the time. Zieten was the first torpedo-armed vessel in a series of avisos that ultimately developed into the first light cruisers. In addition to her impact in German warship design, Zieten also influenced numerous other navies, who built dozens of similar avisos and torpedo vessels of their own.

Zieten served for the first two decades of her career with the torpedo boat flotilla. In 1878–1880, she was captained by Alfred von Tirpitz, the future architect of the High Seas Fleet. In 1882, she cruised the Mediterranean Sea with several other German warships, and was present during the British bombardment of Alexandria, where she protected German interests. Zieten was used as a fishery protection ship from 1899 until 1914, when the outbreak of World War I necessitated her mobilization as a coastal patrol ship. She served in this capacity for the duration of the war, and was stricken from the naval register in December 1919. The ship was finally sold for scrapping in August 1921, after forty-five years of service.

== Design ==
In 1869, the Prussian Navy sent then-Korvettenkapitän (KK) Alexander von Monts to Austria to examine the new Whitehead torpedoes then being developed there. Albrecht von Stosch, the commander in chief of the new Imperial German Navy, approved a plan to develop a torpedo arm for the German fleet a part of his fleet plan of 1872. Stosch envisioned a variety of torpedo craft, including small torpedo boats for use in coastal areas and larger vessels capable of operating at sea. He placed Monts in charge of the program in 1873. That year, Stosch's naval construction program called for a tender for the new torpedo boats. Because German firms had no experience building a ship of this type, the navy placed an order from the British firm the Thames Iron Works, which was to be built to the firm's design. The new vessel, named Zieten after the 18th century cavalry commander Hans Joachim von Zieten, was to be the last major warship purchased by the German navy from a foreign shipyard.

In addition to the planned role as a tender for torpedo boats, she was also intended to serve as a test platform for the new self-propelled torpedo. Up to the mid-1870s, the German navy had only experimented with a handful of torpedo ships, all of which were equipped with the old spar torpedo. Zieten spent much of her early career taking part in experiments with early torpedoes and as a tender for torpedo boats. The ship's design provided the basis for both later German avisos—the Blitz class—and all subsequent light cruisers, but also inspired numerous foreign designs, such as several classes of French, Italian, and Austrian avisos and torpedo craft.

=== General characteristics ===
Zieten was 69.5 meters (228 ft) long at the waterline and 79.4 m (260 ft 6 in) long overall. She had a beam of 8.56 m (28 ft 1 in) and a draft of 3.8 m (12 ft 6 in) forward. She displaced 1,001 metric tons (985 long tons; 1,103 short tons) as designed and up to 1,170 t (1,150 long tons; 1,290 short tons) at full load. The hull was constructed with transverse iron frames and contained eight watertight compartments. Initially, Zieten had only a small bridge forward, but in 1899, a new superstructure was built; it included a conning tower with a compass platform. A chart house was also added forward of the funnel.

Zieten was a good sea boat with a gentle motion, but she was very crank. She was very maneuverable, but she handled poorly in a head sea. In bad weather, she took on considerable amounts of water and was very dangerous. The ship had a crew of 6 officers and 88 enlisted men, though later in her career the figure rose to 7 and 99, respectively. During her career as a fishery protection ship, the number of enlisted sailors rose further, to 104. Zieten carried a number of smaller boats: one picket boat, one cutter, two yawls, and one dinghy. Later in her career, the picket boat was removed and two barges were added.

=== Machinery ===
The ship's propulsion system consisted of two horizontal 2-cylinder double-expansion steam engines manufactured by John Penn and Sons. The engines drove two 3-bladed propellers that were 3.05 m (10 ft) wide in diameter. Steam was provided by six coal-fired, cylindrical fire-tube boilers, also manufactured by John Penn and Sons, which were vented through a single funnel amidships. The boilers were replaced with new models in 1891 during a refit at the Kaiserliche Werft (Imperial Shipyard) in Kiel. As built, Zieten was fitted with a schooner rig with a sail area of 355 square meters (3,820 sq ft) to supplement her steam engines, but this was later reduced to only an auxiliary gaff sail.

The engines were rated at 2,000 metric horsepower (1,970 ihp), but only managed to reach 1,807 metric horsepower (1,782 ihp) at maximum power. With the new boilers, the engines reached 2,376 metric horsepower (2,343 ihp). Her top speed as designed was to have been 16 knots (30 km/h; 18 mph), but with her original boilers, she could make 15.9 knots (29.4 km/h; 18.3 mph) at full power. This speed nevertheless made Zieten the fastest ship in the German fleet. With the new boilers, she could steam at up to 16.3 knots (30.2 km/h; 18.8 mph). Zieten could carry up to 130 t (130 long tons; 140 short tons) of coal, which allowed her to steam for 1,770 nautical miles (3,280 km; 2,040 mi) at a cruising speed of 9 knots (17 km/h; 10 mph). During the refit, she also had one electricity generator, with an output of 10 kilowatts (13 hp) at 67 volts, installed.

=== Armament ===
Zieten's primary armament consisted of a pair of 38-centimeter (15 in) torpedo tubes. Both were submerged in the hull, one in the bow and one in the stern. They were supplied with a total of ten Whitehead torpedoes. These powerful weapons, coupled with the ship's high speed and maneuverability, made her a formidable vessel for the period. In 1878, the forward torpedo tube was relocated to a swivel launcher mounted on the deck, and two 12 cm (4.7 in) guns were installed. She was also equipped with six machine guns. Later in her career, the torpedo tubes were removed, due to their obsolescence, and she was rearmed with six 5 cm (1.97 in) SK L/40 guns, though two were later removed. The guns were supplied with a total of 864 rounds of ammunition, and could engage targets out to 6,200 m (6,800 yd). She was also equipped to lay naval mines, and she could carry 49 of them.

== Service history ==
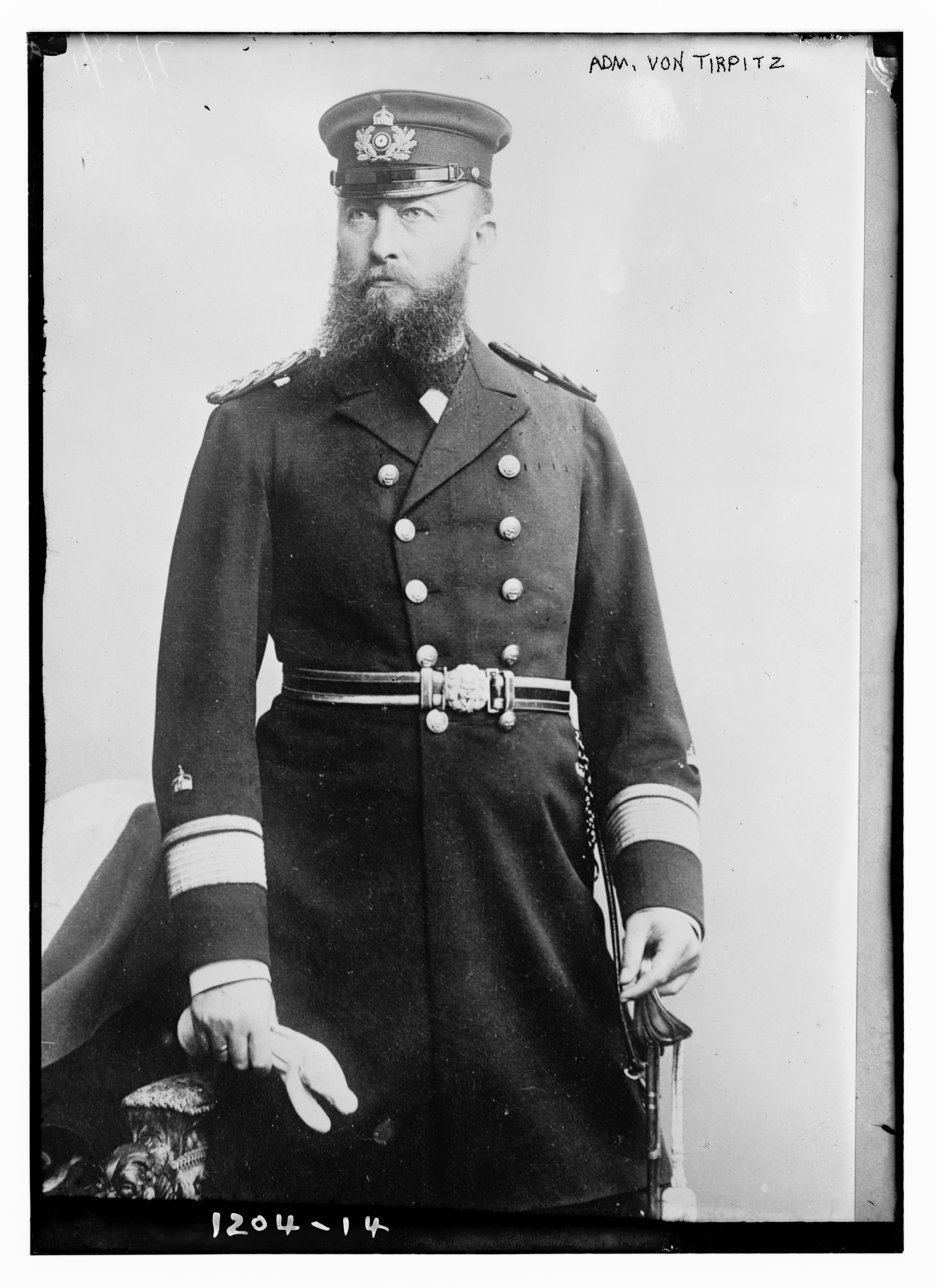
Alfred von Tirpitz, who commanded Zieten from 1878 to 1880

=== Construction and torpedo testing ===
Zieten was built by the Thames Iron Works in London. She was laid down in 1875 and was launched on 9 March 1876. She was completed on 15 July 1876, and commissioned into the German fleet on 1 August. KK Franz Mensing took command of the ship. Zieten arrived at the German naval base at Wilhelmshaven ten days later. On the way to Wilhelmshaven, the ship conducted sea trials in the North Sea; upon her arrival, she was taken into the shipyard for fitting-out work. At the time of the ship's commissioning, Otto von Diederichs served aboard Zieten as her executive officer in her first crew. Diederichs supervised the installation of the ship's torpedo tubes, along with the magazine for storing the torpedoes. The work lasted until September, which prevented Zieten from participating in the annual August–September fleet exercises. Instead, she was sent to the torpedo training school at Friedrichsort in mid-September. She remained there until she was moved to Kiel to be decommissioned for the winter on 17 November. In March 1877, Diederichs returned to the ship and prepared her for service in the training season that year. The ship was ready for active duty by 11 June and thereafter conducted further sea trials and torpedo training.

After Zieten entered service in June 1877, Diederichs was replaced by Kapitänleutnant (KL) Alfred von Tirpitz, who took over torpedo testing while he was assigned to the Torpedo School at Kiel. Diederichs meanwhile readied the old gunboat Scorpion as a tender for Zieten. On 18 September, Zieten and Scorpion participated in the first major test of the new Whitehead torpedoes in the German navy, which was observed by Stosch. During the exercises, Zieten scored three hits on a stationary target, one of which at a distance of 730 m (800 yd), which was deemed a great success. After the conclusion of the maneuvers, Zieten was placed in reserve on 2 October for the winter. The analysis of the testing showed that the bow-mounted torpedo tube was not satisfactory, and so Diederichs was tasked with redesigning her armament in January 1878. Diederichs moved the bow tube to a swivel mount on her deck, and added two 12 cm guns to improve her defense against small warships. The refit work was completed by 16 April 1878, permitting Tirpitz to take command of the ship on 6 May. He served as the ship's commander until August 1880. Tirpitz, as the commander of Germany's torpedo boat flotilla, staunchly advocated the development of torpedo craft rather than a fleet of battleships.

After the ship returned to service in May 1878, she carried out experiments in the area off Friedrichsort, and thereafter began training sailors in the use of torpedoes, which the navy intended to install aboard larger vessels. On 13 May, she was present at the launching of the new ironclad Bayern. Zieten thereafter conducted a torpedo demonstration for members of the Reichstag, who observed aboard the aviso Grille. Zieten torpedoed and sank a small shallop, and then carried out tests with larger wooden-hulled vessels, including vessels with iron-reinforced hulls. The demonstrations led to plans to place torpedo-armed launches aboard the fleet's ironclads, though priority was given to development of the torpedoes themselves. Zieten was decommissioned for the winter on 3 October. Zieten was recommissioned on 5 May 1879 for her normal training and experimentation routine. That year, she sank the old aviso Preussischer Adler with a pair of torpedoes. Zieten was decommissioned for the winter again on 7 October. She was recommissioned on 3 May 1880, and on 28 July, during maneuvers with the fleet, Zieten torpedoed and sank the old paddle steamer Barbarossa. The test was carried out off Heikendorf, Zieten steaming at full speed and firing at a range of 400 m (1,300 ft). In August, KL Max von Fischel relieved Tirpitz as the ship's commander. Zieten was once again laid up for the winter on 15 October. The ship was thereafter withdrawn from her role as a torpedo training and test ship, as she was no longer sufficient for the task. The new screw corvette Blücher had recently been completed as a purpose-built torpedo training vessel, and she replaced Zieten in that role.

=== Service with the fleet ===
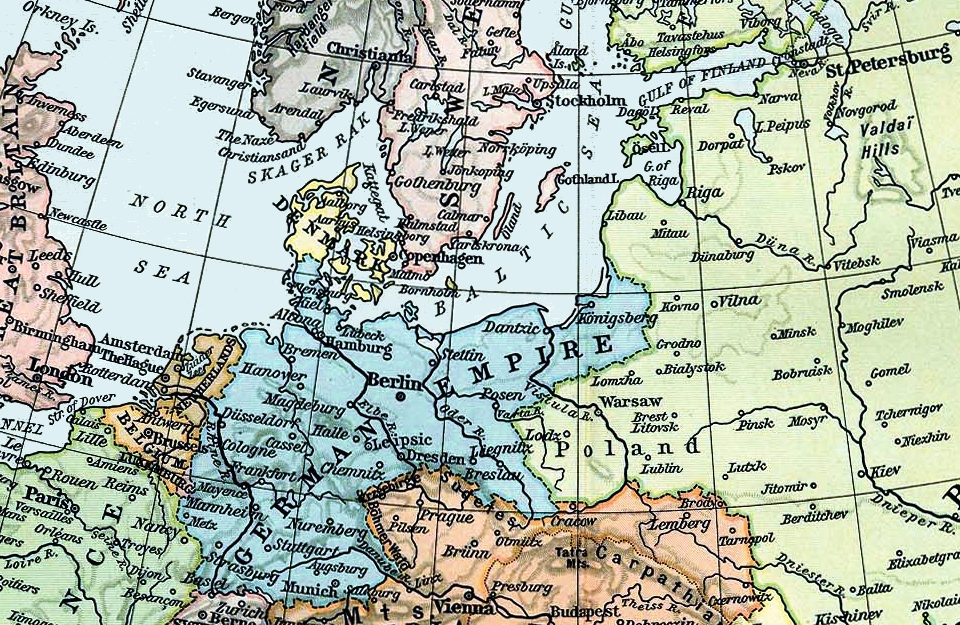
Map of the North and Baltic Seas in 1911

Zieten underwent a major overhaul in 1881 and was recommissioned on 27 June under the command of KL Wilhelm Büchsel; on 16 August, she was reclassified as an aviso. The ship was present for a naval review held for Kaiser Wilhelm I on 17 September, during which she hosted Generalfeldmarschall Helmuth von Moltke. On 1 October, she embarked a commission for a short trip to Alsen. She was again decommissioned on 20 October. She was recommissioned for another period of active service on 14 August 1882, now commanded by KK Carl Barandon. Five days later, Zieten joined a cruising squadron that consisted of the screw corvettes Gneisenau and Nymphe, the steamer Loreley, and the gunboat Cyclop, for operations in the Mediterranean Sea. The ships were present during the British bombardment of Alexandria in August 1882; they sent men ashore to protect the German embassy, along with a German-run hospital. Zieten was at Alexandria on 30 September, where she was replaced by the gunboat Habicht, though Zieten remained in the area until 14 October, by which time the situation had calmed. She departed for Germany that day, but stopped in numerous Mediterranean ports on her way back, arriving in Kiel on 15 November. There, she was again decommissioned ten days later.

The ship remained out of service for the following three years, and she was assigned as the aviso for the Reserve Division on 15 November 1885, though she remained out of commission at that time. She was reactivated on 30 July 1886 to take part in the fleet maneuvers that were carried out in the North and Baltic Seas, before being decommissioned again on 29 September. She spent much of 1887 in drydock to have her boilers replaced, and she carried out sea trials from late January 1888 to the end of February. In May, she returned to active service with the Ironclad Training Squadron, now under the command of KK Oscar Klausa. In July, Zieten joined a squadron of ships to take the newly crowned Kaiser Wilhelm II for a tour of Baltic ports, which included a visit to Tsar Alexander III of Russia. Zieten was decommissioned again on 20 September. The ship was next recommissioned on 1 May 1889, and that year she joined the Training Squadron that escorted Wilhelm II on a visit to the United Kingdom. Her active service concluded after that year's fleet exercises, when she was decommissioned on 19 September. The 1890 service period lasted from 2 May to 1 October, during which she took part in routine training exercises with the rest of the fleet. These were interrupted from 9 to 26 July by another cruise in company with Wilhelm II, this time to Norway.

Zieten was recommissioned on 1 May 1891 for another training cycle that lasted until 25 September. During this period, KK Louis Riedel served as the ship's captain. On 26 June, the ship was sent to aid the ironclads Kaiser and Deutschland, which had run aground on a shoal in the Putziger Wiek. On the night of 8–9 August, the ship's executive officer and doctor drowned in an accident with a boat off Zoppot. Zieten was reactivated on 30 April 1892 under KK Emil Freiherr von Lyncker's command and was assigned to what was now I Division of the Maneuver Fleet. This service lasted until 30 September, when she was decommissioned once again; this ended her second major period of active service. She remained out of commission for the next five years, during which she was extensively modified again.

=== Fishery protection duties ===
Zieten was next recommissioned on 16 March 1897 for service as a fishery protection vessel, replacing the aviso Meteor in that role. She served in this capacity for the next seventeen years, cruising as far north as Iceland, as far west as the English Channel, and into the Skagerrak and Kattegat. She protected German fishermen in disputes with other countries and came to the aid of German and foreign vessels in distress. During the winter months, when fishing vessels did not generally operate, Zieten would be laid up in Wilhelmshaven with a reduced crew. The ship began operations on 6 April 1897, and in early June, she held a training school with the German Maritime Fishing Association to teach sailors maritime law, helmsmanship, and medical procedures to prepare them for life at sea. On 20 June, she was present for a sailing regatta at the mouth of the Elbe. The ship thereafter visited Ostend, Belgium, for a conference with the commanders of fishery protection ships of several other countries that lasted from 30 June to 5 July. Included were the British HMS Hearty, the Belgian Ville D'Ostende, the Danish gunboat Groensund, the Dutch gunboat Bonaire, and the French Ibis. The chief topic of discussion was a standardized signaling system to be used by the vessels in question. On 22 September, Zieten anchored in Wilhelmshaven, remaining there until early October. At that time, the aviso Pfeil joined Zieten on fishery patrol duties. Zieten was decommissioned for the winter on 29 November.

In 1898, the navy planned a major cruise into the Arctic Ocean, but Zieten was not suitable for the voyage, so her crew was transferred to the screw corvette Olga instead. Zieten was assigned as the dispatch vessel for the Reserve Squadron in the North Sea that year, along with the coastal defense ships Beowulf and Frithjof, though she remained out of service through the rest of the year. She was recommissioned in 16 March 1899 for another stint patrolling the fishing grounds in the North Sea and Atlantic. KK Hartwig von Dassel served as the ship's commander at this time. On 24 May, she stopped the British fishing vessel Prome, which was illegally fishing off Amrum. Zieten's crew arrested an officer and four men from the boat and took them to Wilhelmshaven, where they were handed over to the police. Zieten returned to Wilhelmshaven on 19 August to have her boilers overhauled, after which she joined the fleet maneuvers being carried out in the Baltic. She was thereafter decommissioned again in Wilhelmshaven on 30 November. The ship remained out of service through 1900 for another major reconstruction that significantly altered the vessel's appearance. She was recommissioned on 15 March 1901, and thereafter embarked on a survey off Iceland with a newly built fishing trawler to determine the best fishing grounds and times. Zieten's crew celebrated the ship's 25th anniversary of her first commissioning on 2 August. During large-scale maneuvers held in conjunction with the German Army, Zieten served as a convoy escort for a group of troopships carrying IX Corps to Amrun.

Zieten continued in her typical fishery protection duties in 1902, and she was supported by the old gunboat Bremse. During this period, Oberleutnant zur See Paul Boethke commanded the ship. On 27 June, she took part in amphibious landing training in company with the ironclads Baden and Württemberg at the island of Borkum. In September, Zieten participated in the final exercises during the annual fleet maneuvers. The next several years passed relatively uneventfully. Beginning in 1903, several torpedo boats were used to support the ship on fishery patrols. She joined the fleet for its annual training maneuvers in mid-August 1905. From October 1905 to September 1906, KK Carl Wedding commanded the ship. She again participated in the fleet exercises from 25 August to 7 September 1907, this time as part of the Supply Ship Unit. She took part in the 1908 maneuvers as well, which lasted from 31 August to 12 September. Following the conclusion of the exercises, KK Friedrich von Bülow took command of the vessel, serving in that role to September of the following year. On 11 October 1908, during the Gordon Bennett balloon race, several balloons were blown out into the North Sea by unfavorable winds, and Zieten was involved in the rescue effort. She reprised her role with the supply ships during the 1909 fleet maneuvers, which lasted from mid-August to 5 September. On 3 December, she and the torpedo boat S61 searched for several fishing boats that had gone missing in a severe winter storm. She was laid up for 1910 for a major overhaul. After returning to service in 1911, she conducted experiments contacting fishing vessels with a wireless telegraph, beginning on 10 April. She seized several British vessels illegally fishing in German waters in 1912, during which time the ship was commanded by KK Erich von Zeppelin. In May 1914, her crew boarded another British fishing boat.

=== World War I and fate ===
Following the start of World War I in late July 1914, Zieten was mobilized as part of the German coastal defense forces. On 1 August, she was assigned to the harbor flotilla that was based in the Jade Bay and the mouth of the Weser. She supported the coastal patrols there for most of the conflict, until July 1918, when she became the flotilla leader for a group of patrol vessels based in the Elbe. In November 1918, Germany agreed to an armistice that ended the war, and the following month Zieten's crew was reduced. She remained in service into 1919, and she made several voyages in the North Sea beginning in January. These included acting as the pilot ship for the lightvessel that was stationed on the south side of the Dogger Bank, and escorting U-boats of the 14th U-boat Group on their way to be surrendered at Harwich, United Kingdom. Zieten was decommissioned on 5 July, nearly forty-three years after her first commissioning; she was the second-longest serving vessel of the Imperial German fleet, after the aviso Grille. Zieten was stricken from the naval register on 6 December 1919. The ship was sold on 18 April 1921 for 655,000 marks and broken up in Wilhelmshaven.
