= Stylianos Lykoudis =

Greek rear admiral

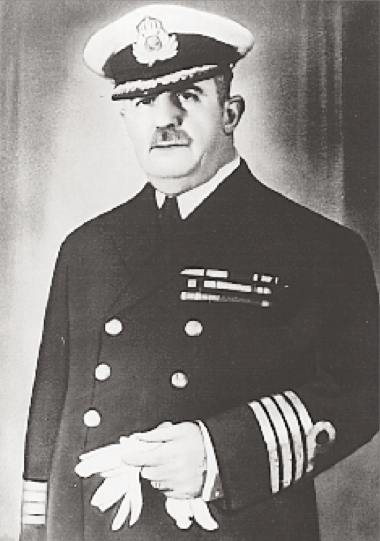
Photo of Lykoudis in the late 1930s

Stylianos Lykoudis (Greek: Στυλιανός Λυκούδης, March 23, 1878 – 1958) was a Royal Hellenic Navy rear admiral, best known for his long service as head of the Navy's Lighthouse Service (Υπηρεσία Φάρων). He was also a scholar and historian, becoming a member of the Academy of Athens.

== Life ==
He was born in Ermoupolis, Syros on 23 March 1878, the son of Emmanouil Lykoudis. At the age of 13 he entered the Navy Academy, graduating in 1895 as an Ensign. At the time he was the youngest officer of the Royal Hellenic Navy.

As a young officer, he served on the ironclad battleships Hydra, Spetsai, and Psara, the gunboat Alfeios and the auxiliary Kanaris. During this period he began his studies of the Greek seas and coasts, and composed, on his own initiative, the first studies on a lighthouse network for the Greek coasts. His initial proposals to this effect fell on deaf ears, however. In 1904 he was appointed a professor at the Navy Academy, in 1908–10 he taught aboard the training vessels Acheloos and Pineios, and in 1910 he was placed captain of the torpedo boat Lonchi.

In February 1910, in the aftermath of a series of ship sinkings, a new law sought to reorganize the Navy's lighthouse service, and Lykoudis' reports came to the attention of Prime Minister Eleftherios Venizelos. In 1911 he was detached to the lighthouse service as research officer, but he became its de facto head, a post that was formalized in 1915. By 1920 he had reached the rank of Captain, and remained in his post as head of the Lighthouse Service until he retired as a rear admiral on 5 April 1939; at the time, he was the oldest serving officer of the Navy, with a continuous service of over 53 years. He was immediately recalled to active service by Royal Decree, however, as a special counsellor to the Lighthouse Service and the Navy Historical Service. He finally retired in April 1941, following the German invasion of Greece. During his 25-year tenure as head of the Lighthouse Service, 191 new lighthouses were installed, or 140% more than in the preceding 85 years of the service's existence, and 35 more already extant lighthouses were taken over as a result of territorial expansion. He also made major efforts to modernize the existing system, installing electricity and plumbing in many extant lighthouse stations, pioneering the use of Dalén lights in 1912, as well as the first automatic lighting installation in 1915.

In parallel to his work as head of the Lighthouse Service, he continued to teach at the Navy Academy, published a number of historical studies like the 1917 History of lighthouses on the Greek shores from antiquity to the present day, and wrote articles on naval issues for encyclopaedias. His study for the lighting of the Dardanelles–Marmara Sea–Bosporus area was accepted without modifications by the International Straits Commission of the League of Nations. As a result of his scholarly activities, in 1929 he was elected as a supernumerary member of the Academy of Athens, becoming a full member by unanimous vote in 1939. He died in 1958.

The Greek Navy honoured his memory by giving the name Lykoudis (A-481) to one of its lighthouse tender ships, which entered service in 1976.

== Sources ==
- De Wire, Elinor; Reyes-Pergioudakis, Dolores (2010). The Lighthouses of Greece. Pineapple Press Inc. ISBN 9781561644520.
- Tzamtzis, Anastasios I. (13 August 1995). "Ο Στυλιανός Ε. Λυκούδης". Καθημερινή 7 Ημέρες, 2-32: Το Φαρικό Δίκτυο (PDF) (in Greek). Kathimerini. p. 19. Archived from the original (PDF) on 10 September 2012.
