= Ottoman ironclad Hamidiye =

Ironclad warship of the Ottoman Navy

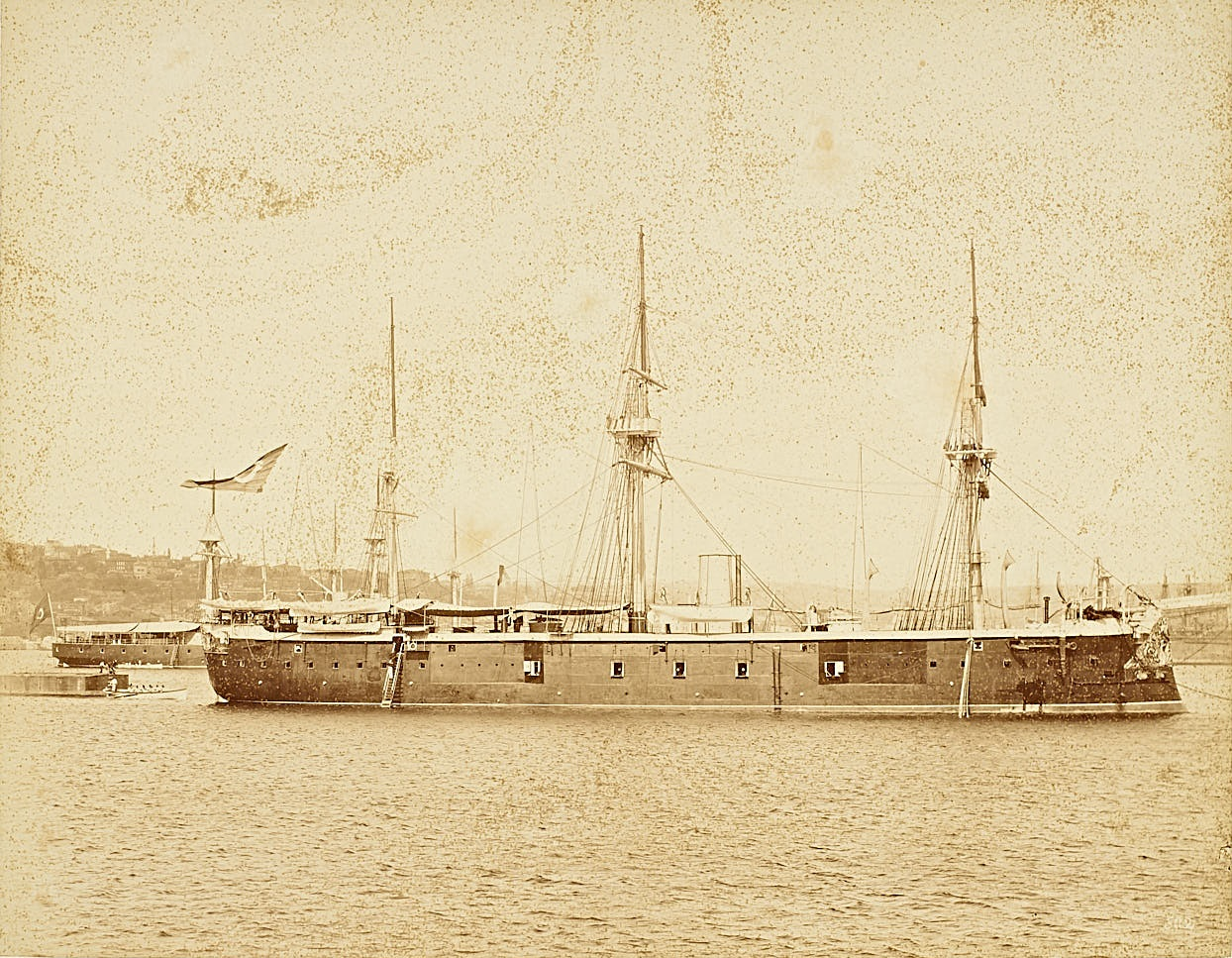
- Hamidiye in the Golden Horn

Class overview
- Name: Hamidiye class
- Operators: Ottoman Navy
- Preceded by: Mesudiye
- Succeeded by: None

History

Ottoman Empire
- Name: Hamidiye
- Namesake: Abdul Hamid I
- Ordered: 1871
- Builder: Imperial Arsenal, Constantinople
- Laid down: December 1874
- Launched: February 1885
- Commissioned: 1894
- Decommissioned: 1903
- Fate: Broken up, 1913

General characteristics
- Type: Central battery ship
- Displacement: 6,594 metric tons (6,490 long tons)
- Length: 87.6 m (287 ft 5 in) (pp); 89 m (292 ft) (loa)
- Beam: 16.9 m (55 ft 5 in)
- Draft: 7.5 m (24 ft 7 in)
- Installed power: 4 × box boilers; 6,800 ihp (5,100 kW)
- Propulsion: 1 × compound steam engine; 1 × screw propeller
- Speed: 13 knots (24 km/h; 15 mph)
- Complement: 350
- Armament: 4 × 228 mm (9 in) Armstrong guns; 10 × 150 mm (5.9 in) guns; 6 × 37 mm (1.5 in) guns; 2 × 450 mm (17.7 in) torpedo tubes
- Armor: Belt: 229 mm (9 in); Casemate: 178 mm (7 in); Conning tower: 178 mm

Hamidiye was a unique ironclad warship built for the Ottoman Navy in the 1870s, the last vessel of the type completed for the Ottomans. She was a central battery ship, mounting most of her armament in a central casemate. The ship, built by the Ottoman Imperial Arsenal took nearly twenty years to complete; she was laid down in December 1874, launched in 1885, and completed in 1894. Due to her lengthy construction period, she was already obsolete by the time she was launched. Her poor handling and low quality armor contributed to a short career, spent almost entirely as a stationary training ship. She was briefly activated in 1897 during the Greco-Turkish War, but she was already in bad condition just three years after she entered service, as was the rest of the ancient Ottoman fleet. The Ottomans embarked on a reconstruction program after the incident humiliated the government, but Hamidiye was in too poor a state by 1903 to warrant rebuilding, and she was accordingly decommissioned that year, placed for sale in 1909, and sold to ship breakers in 1913.

== Design ==
In 1861, Abdülaziz became sultan of the Ottoman Empire, and thereafter began a construction program to strengthen the Ottoman Navy, which had incurred heavy losses during the Crimean War of 1853–1856. He ordered several ironclad warships from shipyards in Britain and France, though the program was limited by the Ottoman Empire's limited finances. Hamidiye was one of a handful of ironclads to be ordered from the Ottoman Imperial Arsenal; her design was based on preceding, British-built Mesudiye-class central battery ships, albeit reduced in scale to the size of the earlier Osmaniye class. In addition, a protected rudder was incorporated into the hull. She was the last ironclad to be built for the Ottoman Navy; two Peyk-i Şeref-class ironclads were ordered from Britain after Hamidiye, but both ships were purchased by the Royal Navy before completion. She was also the last central battery ship to be completed, though the German Oldenburg was begun after Hamidiye, she was completed before Hamidiye entered service. Lastly, she was the final ironclad of any type to carry muzzle-loading guns.

=== Characteristics ===
Hamidiye was 87.6 m (287 ft 5 in) long between perpendiculars and 89 m (292 ft) long overall. She had a beam of 16.9 m (55 ft 5 in) and a draft of 7.5 m (24 ft 7 in). Her hull was constructed with iron, and displaced 6,594 metric tons (6,490 long tons) normally. She had a crew of 350 officers and enlisted men as completed. The ship was fitted with three pole masts, and the foremast carried a single searchlight. She was equipped with torpedo nets, but the wooden booms were carried aboard the ship, rather than attached to the sides of the hull, and the nets were kept ashore.

The ship was powered by a single horizontal, two-cylinder compound steam engine manufactured by Maudslay, which drove one screw propeller. This engine had originally been intended for the frigate Selimiye, but had never been installed. The very lengthy construction time for the ship left the engine idle in the dockyard for some twelve years, during which time numerous components were stripped for use in other projects, so that by 1883, it had to be completely rebuilt. Steam was provided by four coal-fired box boilers manufactured by the Imperial Arsenal, which were trunked into a single funnel amidships. The engine was rated at 6,800 indicated horsepower (5,100 kW) and produced a top speed of 13 knots (24 km/h; 15 mph) on sea trials. Hamidiye carried 600 t (590 long tons; 660 short tons) of coal. A supplementary sailing rig with three masts was also fitted.

Hamidiye was designed to be armed with a main battery of ten 240 mm (9.4 in) 35-caliber breechloading guns manufactured by Krupp in a central casemate, firing through gun ports. These were to be supported by four 150 mm (5.9 in) 35-cal. Krupp breechloading guns and two 57 mm (2.2 in) Hotchkiss guns, the latter for defense against torpedo boats, along with two 450 mm (17.7 in) torpedo tubes. By the time she had been completed, however, she was armed with four 228 mm (9 in) muzzleloading Armstrong guns and ten of the 150 mm Krupp guns. The Armstrong guns were placed in each corner of the casemate, which allowed them a fairly wide arc of fire and limited capability for two of the guns to fire either directly ahead or astern. Six of the 150 mm guns were carried in the casemate on the broadside, three guns per side, and the remaining four were placed on the upper deck, two in the bow and two at the stern. The anti-torpedo boat battery was strengthened with the addition of six 37 mm (1.5 in) guns. The two 450 mm torpedo tubes were retained in deck-mounted launchers.

The ship was protected with wrought iron armor plate that was manufactured at the Imperial Arsenal where the ship was built. She had a complete armored belt at the waterline, which extended 2 meters (6 ft 2 in) above the waterline and 2 meters (5 ft) below. The belt was 229 millimeters (9 in) thick, and tapered down to 127 mm (5 in) at either end of the ship. The casemate battery was protected with 178 mm (7 in) iron plate. The conning tower also had 178 mm thick sides on 280 mm (11 in) of cypress backing. Hamidiye's armor proved to be poor quality, being described in Conway's All the World's Fighting Ships as "very spongy and flaky".

== Service history ==
Hamidiye was ordered from the Imperial Arsenal in 1871, originally under the name Nüsretiye, and was laid down there in December 1874. After the original Hamidiye, of the Mesudiye class, was purchased by the Royal Navy, Nüsretiye was renamed Hamidiye, in honor of Sultan Abdul Hamid I. Work proceeded at an extremely slow pace, and she was launched or on 4 January 1885 and the following day, she was found to be filling with water, the result of a missing rivet in her keel. She was finally ready for sea trials, though without her armament installed, by 1893. Fitting-out work was completed the following year, when she was commissioned into the Ottoman fleet, though she remained in the Golden Horn until 1897. By the time she entered service, she had been surpassed by the rapidly changing warship designs of the 1880s and 1890s, first by the turret ships such as the Italian Duilio type, and then by modern pre-dreadnought battleships like the British Royal Sovereign class, which began to enter service the year before Hamidiye was commissioned. Moreover, Hamidiye was equipped with poor quality armor and was difficult to handle, so she was employed as a stationary training ship for torpedo boat crews. (Note: According to a German observer during the Greco-Turkish War of 1897, "when [Hamidiye] was launched...she proved unmanageable; accordingly she was towed back into the arsenal, where she has since spent her life in philosophic contemplation.") In addition, Sultan Abdul Hamid II, who had come to power in 1876 as a result of a coup in which the Navy had played a major role, distrusted the Navy and reduced its budgets to the minimum.

With the outbreak of the Greco-Turkish War in February 1897, Hamidiye was mobilized into the I Squadron of the fleet. On 19 March, Hamidiye and the ironclads Mesudiye, Aziziye, and Necm-i Şevket and three torpedo boats departed the Golden Horn, bound for the Dardanelles. This was Hamidiye's first cruise since commissioning three years earlier, and she suffered severe boiler problems during the operation. The squadron stopped off Lapseki on 22 March, having lost two of the torpedo boats to unseaworthiness. The Ottomans inspected the fleet and found that almost all of the vessels, including Hamidiye—despite the fact that she had been completed three years previously—to be completely unfit for combat against the Greek Navy, which possessed the three modern Hydra-class ironclads.

On 15 April, the British Admiral Henry Wood and the German Admiral Eugen Kalau vom Hofe began an inspection of the Ottoman fleet, which concluded that only a handful of ships were seaworthy, and as a result, should not be used offensively. Through April and May, the Ottoman fleet made several sorties into the Aegean Sea in an attempt to raise morale among the ships' crews, though the Ottomans had no intention of attacking Greek forces. On 15 May, Hamidiye and the ironclads Mesudiye, Necm-i Şevket, Osmaniye, and Aziziye, along with several other vessels conducted a major training exercise under the supervision of von Hofe, where severe deficiencies in the level of training were revealed, particularly with the men's ability to operate the ships' guns. In September 1897, the war came to an end, and the Ottoman fleet returned to Constantinople.

The condition of the Ottoman fleet could not be concealed from foreign observers. The fleet proved to be an embarrassment for the government and finally forced Sultan Abdul Hamid II to authorize a modernization program, which recommended that the ironclads be modernized in foreign shipyards. German firms, including Krupp, Schichau-Werke, and AG Vulcan, were to rebuild the ships, but after having surveyed them, withdrew from the project in December 1897 owing to the impracticality of modernizing the ships and the inability of the Ottoman government to pay for the work due to its weak finances. Negotiations dragged on into the early 1900s, but Hamidiye was not included in the program. Instead, Hamidiye was decommissioned in 1903; the Ottoman Navy considered rebuilding the ship that year, like many of the other ironclads, but the ship was in too poor a condition to merit reconstruction. On 11 November 1909, she was placed for sale, and she was finally purchased by ship breakers in 1913 and thereafter dismantled.
