= Hydra-class ironclad =

Ironclad warship class of the Greek Navy

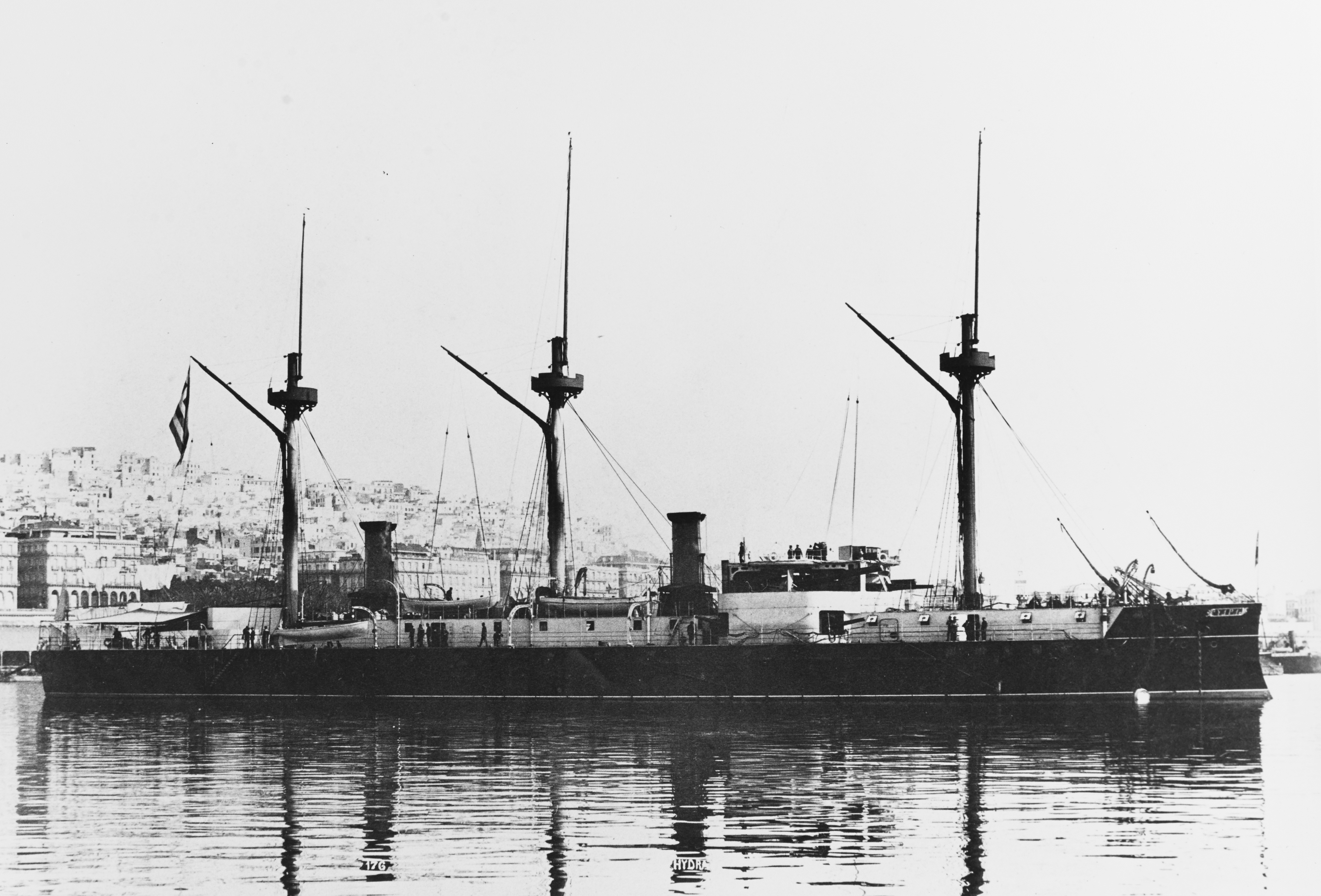
- Hydra early in her career

Class overview
- Name: Hydra class
- Builders: Forges et Chantiers de la Méditerranée (2); Ateliers et Chantiers de la Loire (1)
- Operators: Hellenic Navy
- Built: 1885–1892
- In service: 1892–1929
- Completed: 3
- Retired: 3

General characteristics
- Type: Ironclad
- Displacement: 4,808 long tons (4,885 t)
- Length: 334 feet 8 inches (102.01 m)
- Beam: 51 ft 10 in (15.80 m)
- Draft: 18 ft (5.5 m)
- Installed power: 4 × fire-tube boilers; 6,700 indicated horsepower (5,000 kW)
- Propulsion: 2 × triple-expansion steam engines; 2 × screw propellers
- Speed: 17 knots (31 km/h; 20 mph)
- Crew: 400
- Armament: 3 × 10.8-inch (274 mm) guns; 5 × 5.9-inch (150 mm) L36 guns; 4 × 3.4-inch (86 mm) L22 guns; 4 × 3-pdr guns; 4 × 1-pdr guns; 6 × 1-pdr revolver cannons; 3 × 14-inch (356 mm) torpedo tubes
- Armor: Belt: 4 to 12 in (102 to 305 mm); Barbettes: 14 in (360 mm); Deck: 1.9 in (48 mm) (Hydra); 2.3 in (58 mm) (Spetsai and Psara)

The Hydra class of ironclads composed three ships, Hydra, Spetsai, and Psara. The ships were ordered from France in 1885 during the premiership of Charilaos Trikoupis, as part of a wider reorganization and modernization of the Greek armed forces, which had proved themselves inadequate during the Cretan uprising of 1866. Launched in 1889 and 1890, the ships were ready for service with the Greek Navy by 1892. They were armed with a main battery of three 10.8-inch (274 mm) guns and five 5.9-inch (150 mm) guns, and had a top speed of 17 knots (31 km/h; 20 mph).

The ships frequently served together throughout their careers. Their participation in the Greco–Turkish War in 1897 was limited due to intervention by the Great Powers. Modernizations in the 1890s and 1900s upgraded the ships' armament, but by the First Balkan War, they were too slow to keep up with newer vessels in the Greek fleet, particularly the armored cruiser Georgios Averof. They saw action at the Battle of Elli but were left behind due to their slow speed at the Battle of Lemnos. Thoroughly obsolete, the ships were reduced to secondary duties after the war and did not see active duty during World War I. The ships were intended to be sold in 1919, but were retained out of active service until 1929.

== Design ==
The Balkan crisis that started with the Serbo-Bulgarian War, coupled with Ottoman naval expansion in the 1860s and 1870s, prompted the Greek Navy to begin a rearmament program. In addition, the Greek fleet had proved to be too weak to effectively challenge Ottoman naval power during the 1866 Cretan Revolt. In 1885, Greece ordered three new ironclads of the Hydra class. The ships were ordered from the Graville and St. Nazaire shipyards in France during the premiership of Charilaos Trikoupis.

=== Characteristics ===
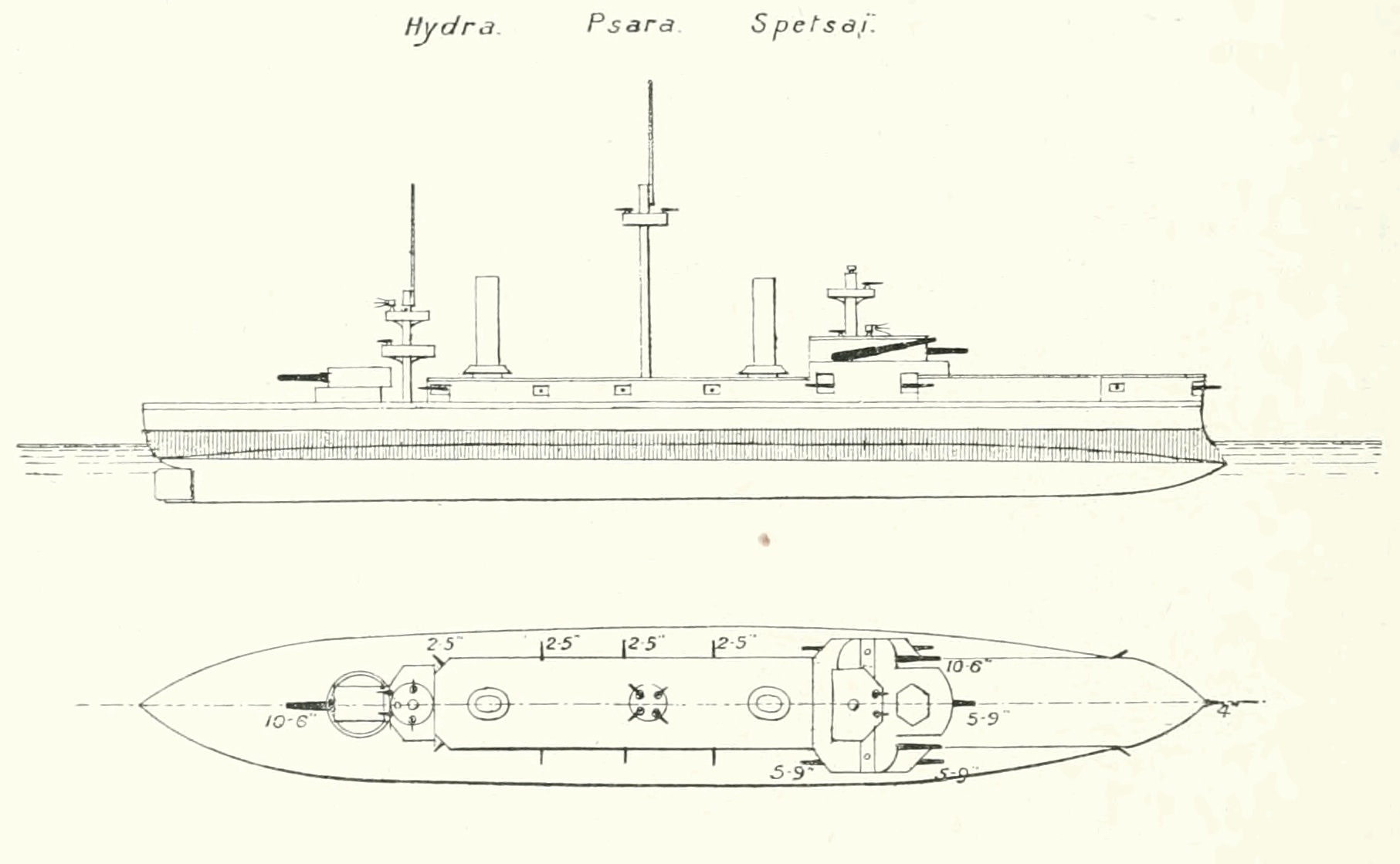
General arrangement plan of Hydra class

The ships were 334 feet 8 inches (102.01 m) long between perpendiculars and had a beam of 51 ft 10 in (15.80 m) and a mean draft of 18 ft (5.5 m). They displaced 4,808 long tons (4,885 t) as built. By 1910, their displacement had increased slightly, to 4,885 long tons (4,963 t). Approximately 400 officers and men crewed each ship. The ships were powered by a pair of triple expansion steam engines with four double-ended cylindrical boilers; they were rated at 6,700 indicated horsepower (5,000 kW) and provided a top speed of 17 knots (31 km/h; 20 mph). Coal storage amounted to 500 long tons (510 t) The boilers were trunked into two funnels. The hull was divided into 118 watertight compartments.

The Hydra class was armed with a main battery of three 10.8-inch (274 mm) Canet guns. Two guns were mounted forward in barbettes on either side of the forward superstructure; these were L/34 guns. (Note: L/34 refers to the length of the gun in terms of calibers. An L/34 gun is 34 times long as it is in diameter.) The third gun, a L/28 gun, was placed in a turret aft. The secondary battery consisted of four 5.9-inch (150 mm) L/36 guns in casemates were mounted below the forward main battery, and a fifth 5.9-inch gun was placed on the centerline on the same deck as the main battery. A number of smaller guns were carried for defense against torpedo boats. These included four 3.4-inch (86 mm) L/22 guns, four 3-pounder guns, four 1-pounder guns, and six 1-pounder Hotchkiss revolver cannons. The ships were also armed with three 14 in (356 mm) torpedo tubes. Two tubes were placed on the broadside and one was mounted in the bow.

The ships were armored with a mix of Creusot and compound steel. The main belt was 12 inches (305 mm) thick amidships and reduced to 4 inches (102 mm) on either end of the hull. At a normal displacement, the main belt extended for 3 in (76 mm) above the waterline. Under a full load, however, the belt was completely submerged below the waterline, rendering it largely ineffective. Above the belt, a strake of 3 in of armor covered the side of the vessels amidships. The main battery was protected by 12 to 14 in (305 to 356 mm) of armor with 12-inch thick barbettes. Hydra had an armored deck 1.9 in (48 mm) thick; the decks of Spetsai and Psara were increased to 2.3 in (58 mm).

== Service history ==
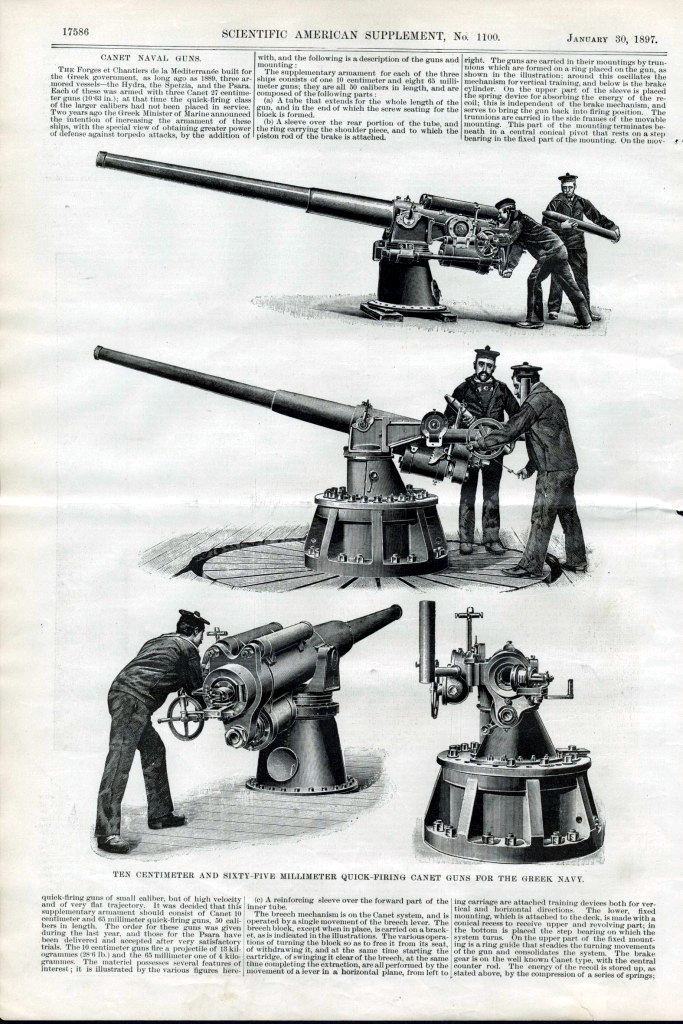
The 10 cm and 6.5 cm Canet guns installed on the Hydra-class vessels in their first modernization

Hydra was built by the Ateliers et Chantiers de la Loire dockyard in St. Nazaire, while Spetsai and Psara were built at the Société Nouvelle des Forges et Chantiers de la Méditerranée shipyard in Graville. Hydra was launched on 15 May 1889. Spetsai was launched on 26 October 1889 and Psara followed on 20 February 1890. All three ships were transferred to Piraeus and in service by 1892.

Throughout their careers, the three Hydra-class ships generally operated together. The ships saw limited action in the Greco–Turkish War in 1897, as the Royal Hellenic Navy was unable to make use of its superiority over the Ottoman Navy. The Ottoman Navy had remained in port during the conflict, but a major naval intervention of the Great Powers prevented the Greeks from capitalizing on their superiority. In the immediate aftermath of the war, the three ships were partially rearmed, with work lasting until 1900. Their small-caliber guns were replaced with one 3.9 in (99 mm) gun forward, eight 65 mm (2.6 in) guns, four 3-pounders, and ten 1-pounder revolver cannon. One of the 14-inch torpedo tubes was replaced with a 15 in (380 mm) weapon.

In 1908–1910, the ships' armament was again revised. The old 5.9 in guns were replaced with new, longer L/45 models. The three ships saw action during the First Balkan War in 1912 at the Battle of Elli, alongside the powerful armored cruiser Georgios Averof. At the subsequent Battle of Lemnos, the ships were left behind due to their slow speed and did not engage the Ottoman flotilla.

By 1914, Hydra and Psara had been reduced to secondary duties: Hydra became a gunnery training ship while Psara was used to train engine-room personnel. During World War I, Greece belatedly entered the war on the side of the Triple Entente and the Hydra-class ships served as coastal defense. They were already obsolete and were decommissioned immediately after the war, although their hulks survived as naval training facilities and accommodation space for a decade. All three ships were broken up for scrap in 1929.

== See also ==
- List of ironclads
