= Greek ironclad Hydra =

Ironclad warship of the Greek Navy

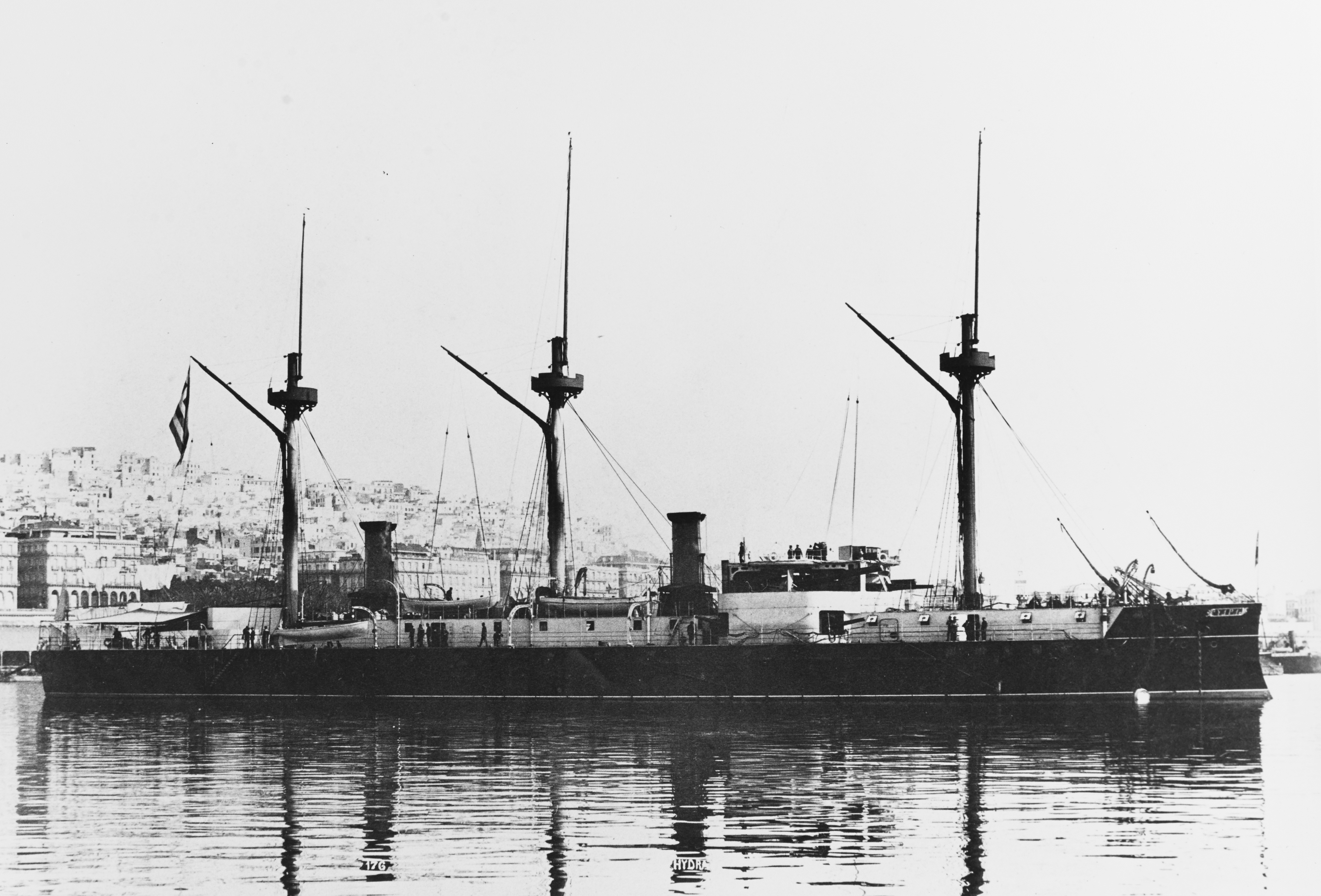
- Hydra early in her career

History

Greece
- Namesake: Hydra Island
- Ordered: 1885
- Builder: St. Nazaire
- Launched: 1889
- Decommissioned: 1918
- Fate: Scrapped in 1929

General characteristics
- Class & type: Hydra-class ironclad
- Displacement: 4,808 long tons (4,885 t)
- Length: 334 feet 8 inches (102.01 m)
- Beam: 51 ft 10 in (15.80 m)
- Draft: 18 ft (5.5 m)
- Installed power: 4 × fire-tube boilers; 6,700 indicated horsepower (5,000 kW)
- Propulsion: 2 × marine steam engines; 2 × screw propellers
- Speed: 17 knots (31 km/h; 20 mph)
- Crew: 400
- Armament: 3 × 10.8 in (270 mm) guns; 5 × 5.9 in (150 mm) guns; 4 × 3.4 in (86 mm) guns; 4 × 3-pounder guns; 4 × 1-pounder guns; 6 × 1-pounder Hotchkiss revolver cannon; 3 × 14 in (356 mm) torpedo tubes
- Armor: Belt: 4 to 12 in (102 to 305 mm); Barbettes: 14 in; Deck: 1.9 in (48 mm)

Hydra (Greek: Ὕδρα) was an ironclad warship of the Greek Navy, named for Hydra, one of the Saronic Gulf islands which played a key role in the war at sea during the Greek War of Independence. The lead ship of her class of ironclads, she was ordered in 1885 in response to a crisis in the Balkans and Ottoman naval expansion. The ship was launched in 1889 and delivered to Greece by 1892. She was armed with a main battery of three 10.8 in (274 mm) guns and five 5.9 in (150 mm) guns, and had a top speed of 17 kn (31 km/h; 20 mph).

Hydra and her sisters saw heavy service with the Greek Navy. They participated in the Greco–Turkish War in 1897 until the Great Powers intervened and prevented the Greek Navy from capitalizing on their superiority over the Ottoman Navy. Hydra saw action in the First Balkan War at the Naval Battle of Elli and was present at the Naval Battle of Lemnos, but was too slow to actively engage the Ottoman forces. She did not see action during World War I, and was reduced to a gunnery training ship after the end of the war. She was ultimately broken up for scrap in 1929.

== Design ==
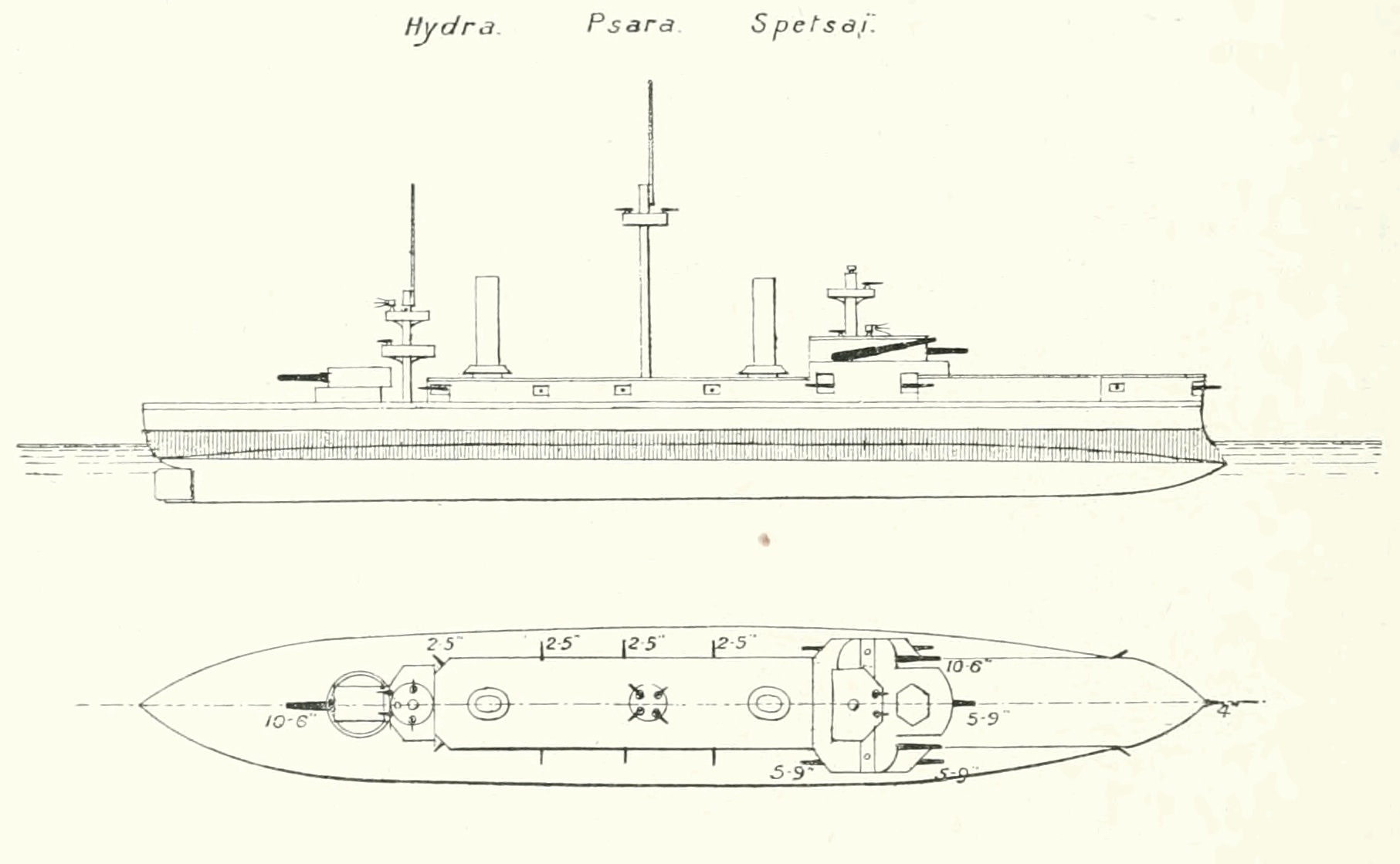
General arrangement drawing of a Hydra class ship

Hydra was 334 feet 8 inches (102.01 m) long between perpendiculars and had a beam of 51 ft 10 in (15.80 m) and a mean draft of 18 ft (5.5 m). She displaced 4,808 long tons (4,885 t) as built. She was powered by a pair of marine steam engines of unknown type with steam provided by four coal-fired fire-tube boilers; they were rated at 6,700 indicated horsepower (5,000 kW) and provided a top speed of 17 knots (31 km/h; 20 mph). Coal storage amounted to 500 long tons (510 t).

Hydra's main battery consisted of three 10.8 in (270 mm) Canet guns in individual mounts. Two guns were mounted forward in barbettes on either side of the forward superstructure; these were L/34 guns. The third gun, a L/28 gun, was placed in a turret aft. The secondary battery consisted of four 5.9 in (150 mm) L/36 guns in casemates were mounted below the forward main battery, and a fifth 5.9-inch gun was placed on the centerline on the same deck as the main battery. A number of smaller guns were carried for defense against torpedo boats. These included four 3.4 in (86 mm) L/22 guns, four 3-pounder guns, four 1-pounder guns, and six 1-pounder Hotchkiss revolver cannons. The ship was also armed with three 14-inch (356 mm) torpedo tubes, one on each broadside and one in the bow.

The ship was armored with a mix of Creusot and compound steel. The main belt was 12 inches (305 mm) thick in the central section and was reduced to 4 inches (102 mm) at either end of the vessel. The main battery barbettes were protected by up to 14 inches of armor. Hydra was fitted with an armor deck that was 1.9 inches (48 mm) thick.

== Service history ==
In 1885, Greece ordered three new ironclads of the Hydra class. Hydra was ordered from the Ateliers et Chantiers de la Loire shipyard in St. Nazaire, France during the premiership of Charilaos Trikoupis. The ship, named for the island of Hydra, was launched in 1889, and by 1892, she and her sister-ships Spetsai and Psara were delivered to the Greek fleet.

The ship saw limited action in the Greco–Turkish War in 1897, as the Royal Hellenic Navy was unable to make use of its superiority over the Ottoman Navy. The Ottoman Navy had remained in port during the conflict, but a major naval intervention of the Great Powers prevented the Greeks from capitalizing on their superiority. In 1897–1900, Hydra and her sister-ships were partially rearmed; Hydra was modified at the La Seyne shipyard. Their small-caliber guns were replaced with one 3.9 in (99 mm) gun forward, eight 65 mm (2.6 in) guns, four 3-pounders, and ten 1-pounder revolver cannon. One of the 14-inch torpedo tubes was replaced with a 15 in (380 mm) weapon. In 1908–1910, the old 5.9 in guns were replaced with new, longer L/45 models.

The Balkan League, of which Greece was a member, declared war on the Ottoman Empire in October 1912. Two months later, the Ottoman fleet attacked the Greek navy, in an attempt to disrupt the naval blockade surrounding the Dardanelles. The Ottoman fleet, which included Turgut Reis, Barbaros Hayreddin, two outdated ironclad battleships, nine destroyers and six torpedo boats, sortied from the Dardanelles at 9:30. The smaller ships remained at the mouth of the straits while the battleships sailed north, remaining near to the coast. The Greek flotilla, which included the armored cruiser Georgios Averof and Hydra and her sisters, had been sailing from the island of Imbros to the patrol line outside the straits. When the Ottomans were sighted, the Greeks altered course to the northeast, in order to block the advance of their opponents. In the ensuing Naval Battle of Elli, the Ottoman ships opened fire first, at 9:50, from a range of about 15,000 yards; the Greeks returned fire ten minutes later, by which time the range had decreased significantly to 8,500 yards. At 10:04, the Ottoman ships completed a 16-point turn, which reversed their course, and steamed for the safety of the straits in a disorganized withdrawal. Within an hour, the routed Ottoman ships had withdrawn into the Dardanelles.

The Naval Battle of Lemnos resulted from an Ottoman plan to lure the faster Georgios Averof away from the Dardanelles. The protected cruiser Hamidiye evaded the Greek blockade and broke out into the Aegean sea; the assumption was that the Greeks would dispatch Georgios Averof to hunt down Hamidiye. Despite the threat to Greek lines of communication posed by the cruiser, the Greek commander refused to detach Georgios Averof from her position. Georgios Averof appeared approximately 12 miles from Lemnos; when the powerful Greek ship was spotted, the Ottomans turned to retreat with Georgios Averof in pursuit. She scored several hits on the fleeing Ottoman ships before breaking off the chase. Hydra and her sisters were too slow to keep up with Georgios Averof, and played no part in the engagement.

By 1914, Hydra had been withdrawn from active duty to serve as a gunnery training ship. At the outbreak of World War I in at the end of July 1914, Greece's pro-German monarch, Constantine I, decided to remain neutral. The Entente powers landed troops in Salonika in 1915, which was a source of tension between France and Greece. In October 1916, Hydra and a pair of torpedo boats defected to the Venizelist faction in the National Schism. Ultimately, the French seized the Greek Navy on 19 October; the heavy units of the Greek fleet were disarmed and placed in reserve for the remainder of the war. Hydra was decommissioned in 1918 and stricken from the naval register the next year. She was to be sold for scrapping in 1921, but instead returned to her role as a naval artillery school from 1922 until 1929 when she was broken up for scrap.

== See also ==
- History of the Hellenic Navy
