= Battle of Lemnos (1913) =

Naval battle during the First Balkan War

- Part of the First Balkan War
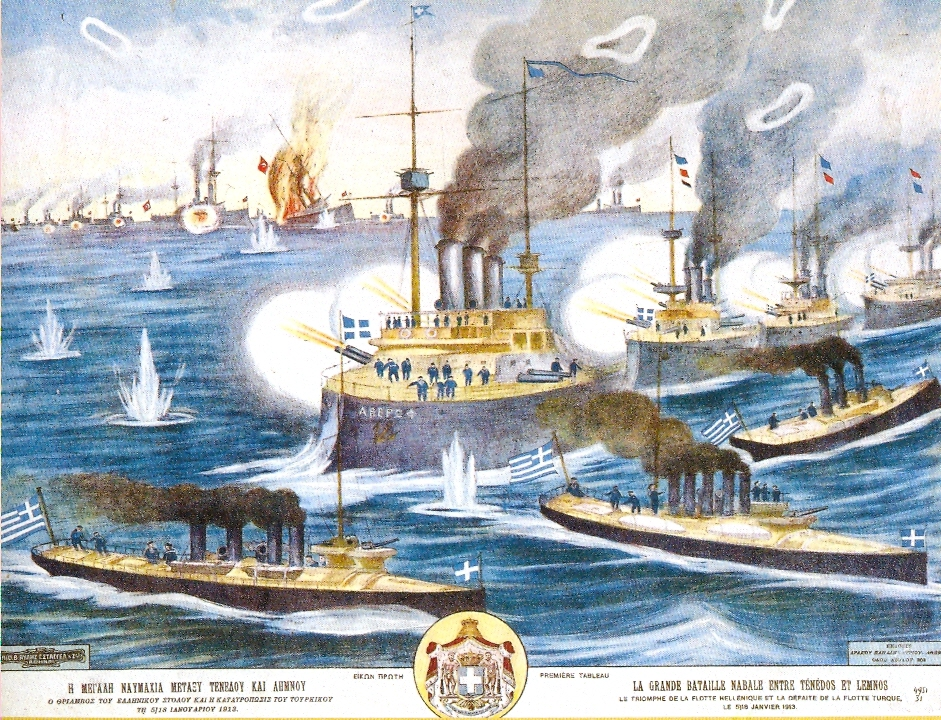
- A Greek lithograph depicting the Averof and Greek fleet during the battle.
Date	18 January [O.S. 5 January] 1913
Location	Off Lemnos, Aegean Sea
Result	Greek victory

Belligerents
(Kingdom of Greece) Greece	Ottoman Empire

Commanders and leaders
Pavlos Kountouriotis	Ramiz Bey

Strength
1 armored cruiser 3 ironclad battleships 7 destroyers	2 pre-dreadnought battleships 1 ironclad battleship 1 protected cruiser 5 destroyers

Casualties and losses
1 wounded	41 killed 104 wounded 2 battleships damaged 1 ironclad damaged

The Naval Battle of Lemnos (Greek: Ναυμαχία της Λήμνου, Turkish: Mondros Deniz Muharebesi), fought on 18 January [O.S. 5 January] 1913, was a naval battle during the First Balkan War, in which the Greeks defeated the second and last attempt of the Ottoman Empire to break the Greek naval blockade of the Dardanelles and reclaim supremacy over the Aegean Sea. This, the final naval battle of the First Balkan War, forced the Ottoman Navy to retreat to its base within the Dardanelles, from which it did not venture for the rest of the war, thus ensuring the dominion of the Aegean Sea and the Aegean islands by Greece.

== Prelude ==
Following the loss of a number of Aegean Islands to Greece during the first phase of the war in 1912, and its first defeat at the Battle of Elli, the Ottoman Navy sought to check Greek progress by destroying the Greek fleet docked at the port of Moudros, Lemnos. However, it faced the problem of countering the Greek flagship, the Georgios Averof, which had already defeated them at Elli.

The Ottomans developed the plan to slip a fast cruiser through the Greek patrols for a raiding mission in the Aegean, hoping to draw off some Greek ships, possibly even the Georgios Averof itself, leaving the remainder of the Greek fleet weakened for attack. Indeed, the cruiser Hamidiye evaded the Greek lookout ships on the night of 13/14 January 1913, and sank a Greek transport ship at Syros the next day, also bombarding the island's harbour. This action caused concern in Athens, and an order was sent to the Fleet, commanding it to "sail immediately in pursuit". Admiral Kountouriotis refused to obey, suspecting an Ottoman trap, and instead prepared for the inevitable exit of the Ottoman Fleet from the Dardanelles Straits.

On the Ottoman side, efforts were made to uplift the morale of the crews, including the hoisting of the original banner of the great corsair and admiral Hayreddin Barbarossa on the flagship, Barbaros Hayreddin, which was named after him.

== Battle ==
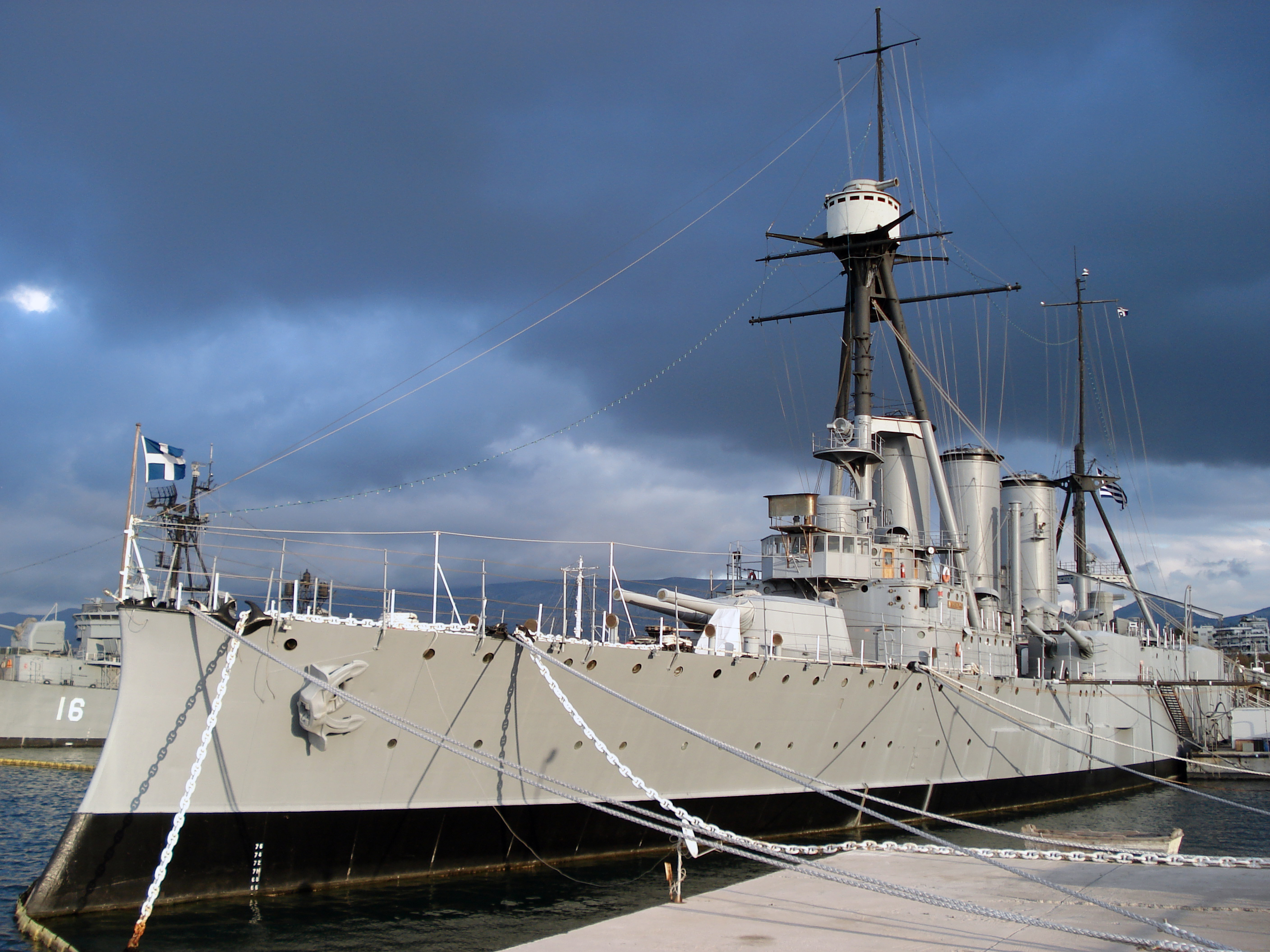
The Greek flagship, Pisa-class armoured cruiser Georgios Averof.

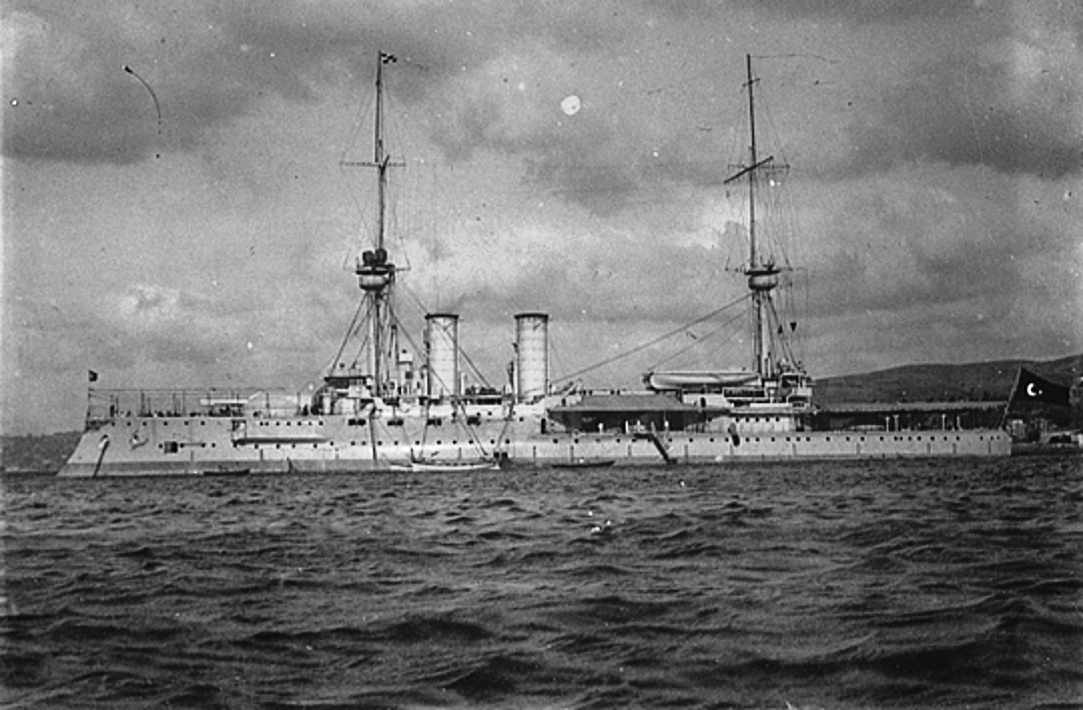
The Ottoman flagship, the Brandenburg-class pre-dreadnought battleship Barbaros Hayreddin.

The Greek fleet, led by Rear Admiral Pavlos Kountouriotis was composed of its 9,960 ton armored cruiser flagship Georgios Averof; the three old ironclad battleships Spetsai, Hydra and Psara; and seven destroyers. The Ottoman flotilla, led by Captain Ramiz Bey included the pre-dreadnought battleships Barbaros Hayreddin and Turgut Reis and the older ironclad battleship Mesûdiye; the cruiser Mecidiye; and five destroyers. The old ironclad Âsâr-ı Tevfik remained in the Dardanelles and did not participate in the battle.

At 08:20 on the morning of January 5, the Greek patrols signalled that the Ottoman fleet had appeared. At 09:45, the Greek fleet sailed from Moudros Bay. The two fleets met some 19.3 kilometers (12 miles) SE of Lemnos, sailing southeast in converging columns, with their flagships in front. The gunnery exchange commenced at 11:34, when the two fleets were at a distance of 8400 meters (9186 yards). Immediately the Greek column turned left, further diminishing the distance. Soon after, the Mecidiye and the accompanying destroyers turned northeast towards the Dardanelles, followed by the Mesûdiye at 11:50, after it had suffered heavy damage from the combined fire of Hydra and Psara. At 11:54, a successful salvo from the Georgios Averof hit the Barbaros Hayreddin, destroying its middle tower, forcing it to withdraw towards the Dardanelles, along with the Turgut Reis at 12:00. As at Elli, the Georgios Averof commenced independent action, using its superior speed, and maneuvering so that it could use the artillery of both its sides, to pursue the Ottoman ships, while the older battleships followed as fast as they could. The pursuit ended finally at 14:30, as the Ottoman ships were nearing the Dardanelles.

== Aftermath ==
Throughout the battle, the Ottoman ships achieved an excellent rate of fire, firing about 800 shells, but with dismal accuracy. Only two hits were registered on the Georgios Averof, causing one injury and minor damages, while the other battleships escaped unscathed. The Ottoman ships suffered far more. Barbaros Hayreddin was hit by over 20 shells, which destroyed much of its artillery, and suffered 32 dead and 45 wounded. Turgut Reis suffered a major leak and other minor damages from 17 hits, and 9 dead and 49 wounded. Mesûdiye also suffered several hits, but the main damage was caused by a 270mm shell which destroyed the central 150mm gun platform, and caused 68 casualties. This, the final naval battle of the First Balkan War, forced the Ottoman Navy to retreat to its base within the Dardanelles, from which it did not venture for the rest of the war, thus ensuring the dominion of the Aegean Sea by Greece.

For the Greeks, the withdrawal of the Ottoman fleet within the Dardanelles was confirmed by 1st Lieutenant Michael Moutoussis and Ensign Aristeidis Moraitinis on January 24, 1913. They conducted a naval aviation mission, flying their Maurice Farman hydroplane over the Nagara naval base, where they spotted the enemy fleet. During their sortie, they accurately drew a diagram of the positions of the Ottoman fleet, against which they dropped four bombs. Moutoussis and Moraitinis travelled over 180 kilometers (111.8 miles) and took 140 minutes to complete their mission, which was extensively reported in both the Greek and international press.
