= Ottoman ironclad Mesudiye =

Ironclad warship of the Ottoman Navy

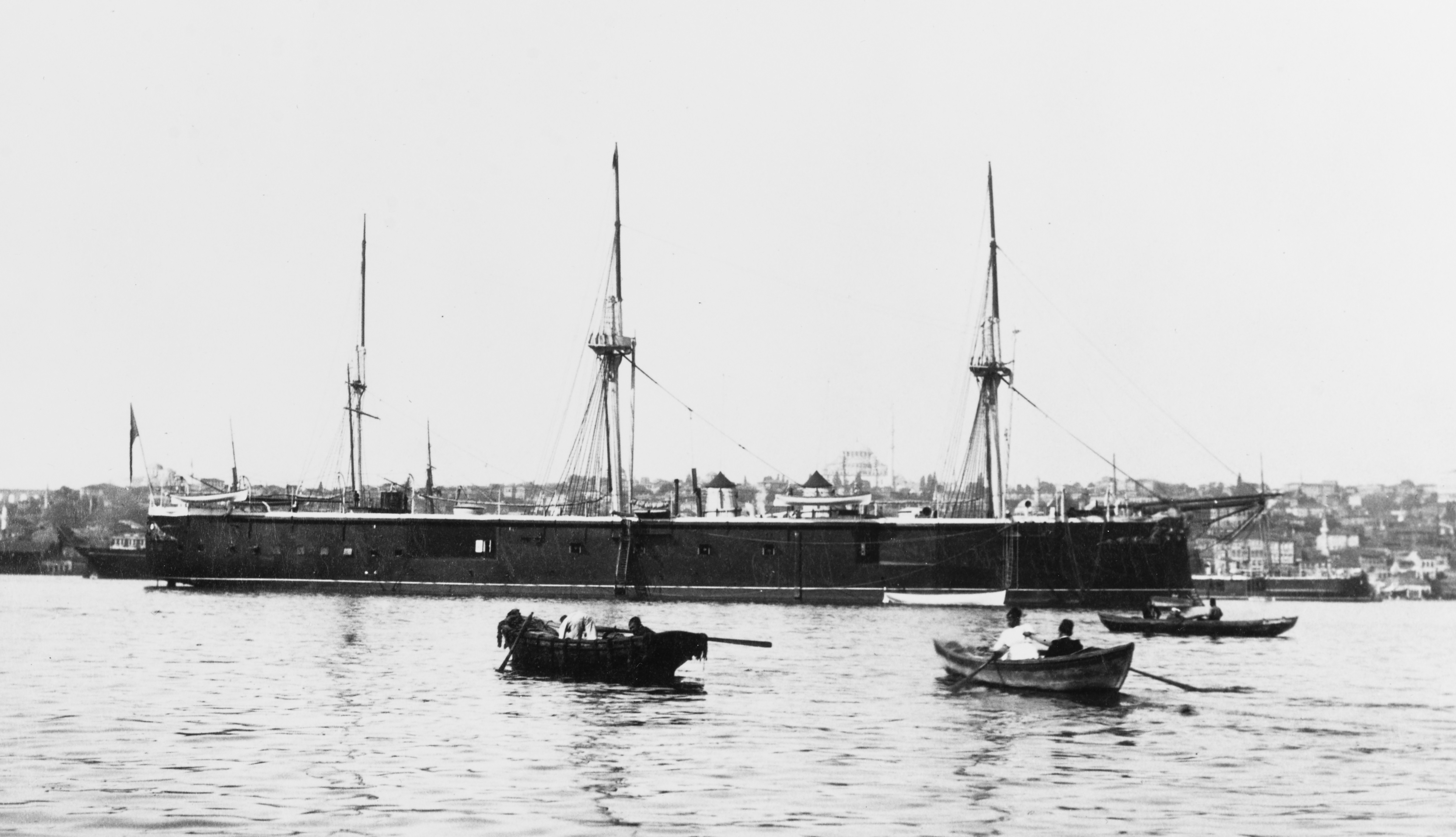
- Ottoman ironclad Mesudiye

Class overview
- Name: Mesudiye class
- Operators: Ottoman Navy
- Preceded by: Iclaliye
- Succeeded by: Hamidiye

History

Ottoman Empire
- Name: Mesudiye
- Builder: Thames Ironworks
- Laid down: 1872
- Launched: 28 October 1874
- Commissioned: December 1875
- Fate: Sunk, 13 December 1914

General characteristics (as built)
- Class & type: Central-battery ironclad
- Displacement: 8,938 metric tons (8,797 long tons)
- Length: 101.02 m (331 ft 5 in)
- Beam: 17.98 m (59.0 ft)
- Draft: 7.9 m (25 ft 11 in)
- Installed power: 7,431 ihp (5,541 kW); 8 × box boilers
- Propulsion: 1 × compound steam engine; 1 × screw propeller
- Speed: 13.7 kn (25.4 km/h; 15.8 mph)
- Complement: 700
- Armament: 12 × RML 10 inch 18 ton guns; 3 × RML 7 inch guns
- Armor: Belt: 305 mm (12 in); Battery: 254 mm (10 in)

General characteristics (1903 reconstruction)
- Class & type: Pre-dreadnought battleship
- Displacement: 9,120 t (8,980 long tons)
- Installed power: 11,000 ihp (8,200 kW); 16 × Niclausse boilers
- Propulsion: 2 × triple-expansion steam engines; 2 × screw propellers
- Speed: 17 kn (31 km/h; 20 mph)
- Complement: 800
- Armament: 2 × 230 mm (9 in) guns (not fitted); 12 × 150 mm (5.9 in) guns; 16 × 76 mm (3 in) guns; 10 × 57 mm (2.2 in) guns; 2 × 47 mm (1.9 in) guns

Mesudiye (Ottoman Turkish: Happiness) was a central-battery ironclad of the Ottoman Navy, one of the largest ships of that type ever built. She was built at the Thames Iron Works in Britain between 1871 and 1875. Mesudiye had one sister ship, though she was purchased by the Royal Navy and commissioned as HMS Superb. Mesudiye's primary armament consisted of twelve 10-inch (250 mm) guns in a central armored battery.

Mesudiye was poorly maintained for most of her career, including a twenty-year long period between the Russo-Turkish War in 1877–1878 and the Greco-Turkish War of 1897. As a result, she was in very poor condition by the late 1890s, which prompted a major reconstruction of her into a pre-dreadnought design type vessel in Genoa. The ship's armament was overhauled, though the gun turrets that were to have mounted 230 mm (9 in) guns never received the weapons. A new propulsion system was also installed, which significantly improved performance.

The ship saw extensive action during the First Balkan War in 1912–1913, including the battles of Elli and Lemnos in December 1912 and January 1913, respectively. During the latter engagement, she was badly damaged by a Greek shell and forced to withdraw. Following the outbreak of World War I in 1914, Mesudiye was moored at Nara to protect the minefields that blocked the entrance to the Dardanelles. On the morning of 13 December, the British submarine HMS B11 passed through the minefields and torpedoed Mesudiye, which quickly sank. Most of the crew survived, however, and many of her guns were salvaged and used to strengthen the defenses of the Dardanelles. A battery of these guns, named Mesudiye in honor of the ship, helped to sink the French battleship Bouvet in March 1915.

== Design ==
In the aftermath of the Crimean War, where an entire Ottoman squadron was destroyed by a Russian fleet at Sinop, the Ottoman Empire began a naval construction program, limited primarily by the chronically weak Ottoman economy. Several ironclad warships were ordered in the 1860s and 1870s, primarily from British and French shipyards. Despite the shortage of funds, by the late 1870s, the Ottomans had acquired a fleet of thirteen large ironclads and nine smaller armored warships. Mesudiye was designed by Edward Reed, who based the design on the recently built British ironclad HMS Hercules.

=== General characteristics and machinery ===
Mesudiye was 101.02 meters (331 ft 5 in) long, and she had a beam of 17.98 m (59 ft) and a draft of 7.9 m (25 ft 11 in). She displaced 8,938 metric tons (8,797 long tons) as originally built. Her hull was constructed with iron, and was fitted with a ram bow. The ship had a minimal superstructure that included a short forecastle deck and a poop deck. She had a crew of 700 officers and enlisted men.

The ship was powered by a single horizontal, two-cylinder compound steam engine, with steam provided by eight coal-fired box boilers. The boilers were trunked into a pair of funnels located amidships. The engines were rated at 7,431 indicated horsepower (5,541 kW) and produced a top speed of 13.7 knots (25.4 km/h; 15.8 mph). By 1884 a decade of poor maintenance had reduced her top speed to 10 knots (19 km/h; 12 mph). She carried 600 t (590 long tons; 660 short tons) of coal. Although intended to operate primarily via her steam engine, Mesudiye was also fitted with three masts and a barque sail rig.

=== Armament and armor ===
Mesudiye was armed with a main battery of twelve RML 10 in (254 mm) 18 ton guns, all mounted in a central battery firing through gun ports. Four were on each side, with four on the broadside, one angled forward and the other angled rearward to allow end-on fire during ramming attacks. She was also equipped with three RML 7 in (178 mm) guns, all on the upper deck, with two forward and one aft; these also served as chase guns. In 1891, six 76 mm (3 in) quick-firing guns (QF) and six 25.4 mm (1 in) QF guns were installed to provide the ship with a defense against torpedo boats.

Armor protection consisted of iron plate; the armored belt had a maximum thickness of 305 mm (12 in) in the central portion of the ship, where it protected machinery and ammunition magazines, and was reduced on either end, first to 127 mm (5 in) and then to 76 mm. The thickest part of the belt extended 1.5 m (5 ft) below the waterline and 1.2 m (4 ft) above the line, and was composed of three strakes. The middle strake was the thickest, the upper strake was reduced slightly to 254 mm (10 in), and the lower one was 230 mm (9 in) and tapered to 150 mm (5.9 in). The gun battery was protected by another two strakes of armor, the lower being 254 mm thick and the upper reduced to 178 mm (7 in).

== Service history ==
Ottoman ironclads at the Golden Horn; Mesudiye is the furthest vessel to the left

Mesudiye, meaning "Happiness", was ordered in 1871 and was laid down at the Thames Ironworks shipyard in London the following year. She was launched on 28 October 1874. On 15 September 1875, she ran aground in the River Medway as she was being taken to Chatham, Kent to have her guns fitted. She was refloated and docked. Mesudiye was commissioned in December 1875 for sea trials. She had one sister ship, Mahmûdiye, which was renamed Hamidiye while under construction. She was purchased by the Royal Navy before completion and commissioned as HMS Superb. Mesudiye and Superb were the largest casemate ironclads ever built. Early in the ship's career, the Ottoman ironclad fleet was activated every summer for short cruises from the Golden Horn to the Bosporus to ensure their propulsion systems were in operable condition.

In September 1876, Mesudiye became the flagship of the Ottoman Black Sea Squadron, though she did not see action in the Russo-Turkish War that broke out in April 1877. After the Ottoman defeat, the fleet was laid up at the Golden Horn and left largely unattended for the following twenty years. The annual summer cruises to the Bosporus ended. By the mid-1880s, the Ottoman ironclad fleet was in poor condition, and Mesudiye was unable to go to sea. Her engines were unusable, having seized up from rust, and her hull was badly fouled. The British naval attache to the Ottoman Empire at the time estimated that the Imperial Arsenal would take six months to get just five of the ironclads ready to go to sea. Throughout this period, the ship's crew was limited to about one-third the normal figure. During a period of tension with Greece in 1886, the fleet was brought to full crews and the ships were prepared to go to sea, but none actually left the Golden Horn, and they were quickly laid up again. By that time, Mesudiye was probably capable of little more than 10 knots (19 km/h; 12 mph), and even that speed would have posed problems for her poorly trained crew over extended periods of time.

During this period of inactivity, Mesudiye received a minor modernization at the Tersâne-i Âmire shipyard on the Golden Horn. At the start of the Greco-Turkish War in February 1897, Mesudiye was found to be unfit for combat, as were most of the other major warships of the fleet. On 15 May Mesudiye and several other warships attempted to hold a training exercise, which only highlighted the poor state of training of the ships' crews.

=== Reconstruction ===
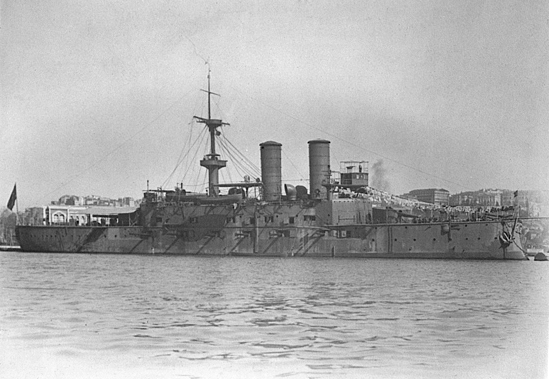
Mesudiye after reconstruction

Following the end of the war, the government decided to begin a naval reconstruction program. The first stage was to rebuild the older armored warships, including Mesudiye. Requests for proposals were sent to foreign shipyards, and in October 1898 the Gio. Ansaldo & C. shipyard in Genoa requested permission to survey the ship and the ironclad Asar-i Tevfik. Both vessels were accordingly sent to Genoa in January 1899, arriving on the 28th, though Ansaldo only received the contract for Mesudiye. Mesudiye was rebuilt into a pre-dreadnought type vessel.

The modernization involved radical reconstruction of the hull; the bow and stern were cut down to make room for a pair of gun turrets, each mounting a single 230 mm (9 in) 40-caliber gun manufactured by Vickers. The turrets had 230 mm thick armored faces, though they never received their guns; wooden dummy guns were installed in their place. A battery of twelve 150 mm (5.9 in) 45-caliber QF guns was installed in place of the old rifled muzzle-loaders, and sixteen 76 mm QF guns were added in an upper battery. Mesudiye also received ten 57 mm (2.2 in) guns and a pair of 47 mm (1.9 in) guns.

A large superstructure was built amidships, with a new conning tower, which was given 200 mm (7.9 in) of armor plating. Displacement rose to 9,120 t (8,980 long tons; 10,050 short tons) normally and 9,710 t (9,560 long tons; 10,700 short tons) at full load. The ship's propulsion system was also completely replaced. Two triple-expansion engines were installed, along with sixteen coal-fired Niclausse boilers. The two screw propellers overlapped, so the port side screw was placed slightly ahead of the starboard one. Performance improved to 11,000 ihp (8,200 kW) and 17 kn (31 km/h; 20 mph). Her crew increased to 800 as a result of the modifications. On 15 March 1904, Mesudiye completed sea trials and thereafter returned to Constantinople.

=== Italo-Turkish and Balkan Wars ===
In 1909, she participated in the first fleet maneuver conducted by the Ottoman Navy in twenty years, part of a reform program initiated by a British naval mission to the Ottoman Empire. Starting in July 1911, Mesudiye joined the two pre-dreadnoughts Barbaros Hayreddin and Turgut Reis, four destroyers, and a torpedo boat for a series of exercises that culminated in the routine summer cruise to Beirut. The fleet was returning to Constantinople when Italy declared war, starting the Italo-Turkish War on 29 September 1911. Mesudiye and the rest of the fleet moored at Nagara Point on 2 October and returned to Constantinople the following day. Mesudiye was thereafter assigned to the Reserve Division, which also included the rebuilt ironclad Asar-i Tevfik and the torpedo cruiser Berk-i Satvet. She did not see action during the conflict, since the Ottoman fleet spent the war in port. This was in part due to the rising tensions in the Balkans that presaged the Balkan Wars; the Ottomans kept their fleet in port so it could be prepared for the inevitable conflict.

In October 1912, the Balkan League declared war on the Ottomans, a month before the Italo-Turkish War ended. At the time, Mesudiye was moored off Büyükdere, a neighborhood in Constantinople, with the torpedo boats Hamidâbad and Kütahya, stationed as a guard ship. In December, the Ottoman fleet was reorganized, with Mesudiye joining the newly formed Battleship Division, under the command of Ramiz Naman Bey. The division also included Barbaros Hayreddin, Turgut Reis, and Asar-i Tevfik. The ship was moved to Büyükçekmece on 15 November, where she joined the rest of the fleet. Two days later, Mesudiye and Barbaros Hayreddin conducted shore bombardments in support of the Ottoman troops holding the Çatalca Line; the bombardments did not cause particularly significant material damage to the attacking Bulgarians, but it did boost Ottoman morale.

==== Battle of Elli ====
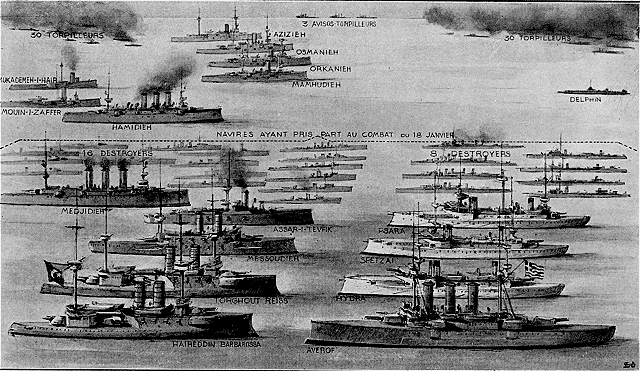
Illustration of the Ottoman and Greek fleets in 1912; Mesudiye is the third ship from the bottom on the Ottoman side

The ships took part in the Battle of Elli, the first Ottoman surface action involving major warships since the Russo-Turkish War, on 16 December 1912. The Ottoman fleet sortied from the Dardanelles at 9:30; the smaller craft remained at the mouth of the straits while the battleships sailed north, hugging the coast. The Greek flotilla, which included the armored cruiser Georgios Averof and three Hydra-class ironclads, sailing from the island of Lemnos, altered course to the northeast to block the advance of the Ottoman battleships. The Ottoman ships opened fire on the Greeks at 9:40, from a range of about 15,000 yd (14,000 m). Five minutes later, Georgios Averof crossed over to the other side of the Ottoman fleet, placing the Ottomans in the unfavorable position of being under fire from both sides.

At 9:50 and under heavy pressure from the Greek fleet, the Ottoman ships completed a 16-point turn (180°), which reversed their course, and headed for the safety of the straits. The turn was poorly executed, and the ships fell out of formation, blocking each other's fields of fire. Barbaros Hayreddin, Turgut Reis, and Mesudiye took several hits during the battle, though only Barbaros Hayreddin was significantly damaged. By 10:17, both sides had ceased firing and the Ottoman fleet withdrew into the Dardanelles. When they approached the straits, Mesudiye and Asar-i Tevfik took up positions to cover the withdrawal of the damaged pre-dreadnoughts. The ships reached port by 13:00 and transferred their casualties to the hospital ship Resit Paşa.

==== Battle of Lemnos ====
In late December, the Ottomans began a campaign of raids and patrols in the Aegean Sea against the islands that had been recently conquered by the Greeks. The Ottoman Army began planning to make a landing on Tenedos in late December, which had been captured by Greece earlier in the war. Mesudiye and the rest of the Battleship Division sortied from the Dardanelles on the morning of 4 January 1913, but the operation was called off after the Greek fleet appeared. On 10 January, the fleet embarked on another offensive operation, this time to raid the island of Imbros. After a brief, inconclusive clash with Greek destroyers, the fleet again withdrew to the safety of the Dardanelles. Eight days later, another fleet operation began, which produced the Battle of Lemnos, the second major naval engagement of the war. The Ottoman plan was to lure the faster Georgios Averof away from the Dardanelles. The protected cruiser Hamidiye evaded the Greek blockade and broke out into the Aegean Sea in an attempt to draw the Greek cruiser into pursuit. Despite the threat posed by the cruiser, the Greek commander refused to detach Georgios Averof.

The Ottoman fleet departed the Dardanelles at 8:20 on the morning of 18 January, and sailed toward the island of Lemnos at a speed of 11 knots (20 km/h; 13 mph). Barbaros Hayreddin led the line of battleships, with a flotilla of torpedo boats on either side of the formation. A long range artillery duel that lasted for two hours began at around 11:55, when the Ottoman fleet opened fire at a range of 8,000 m (26,000 ft). They concentrated their fire on the Greek Georgios Averof, which returned fire at 12:00. At 12:50, the Greeks attempted to cross the T of the Ottoman fleet, but Barbaros Hayreddin turned north to block the Greek maneuver. At around that time, Mesudiye took a serious hit that disabled three of her 150 mm guns; this damage, coupled with boiler trouble, led the Ottoman commander to detach the ship and send her back to port.

On 5 February, Mesudiye supported operations off Şarköy in the Sea of Marmara, bombarding Bulgarian troops that had occupied the town. This was the last wartime operation conducted by the ship; she did not participate in the amphibious assault on Şarköy three days later. The Ottoman fleet then spent the remaining months of the war in port, until the armistice ended the conflict in April.

=== World War I ===
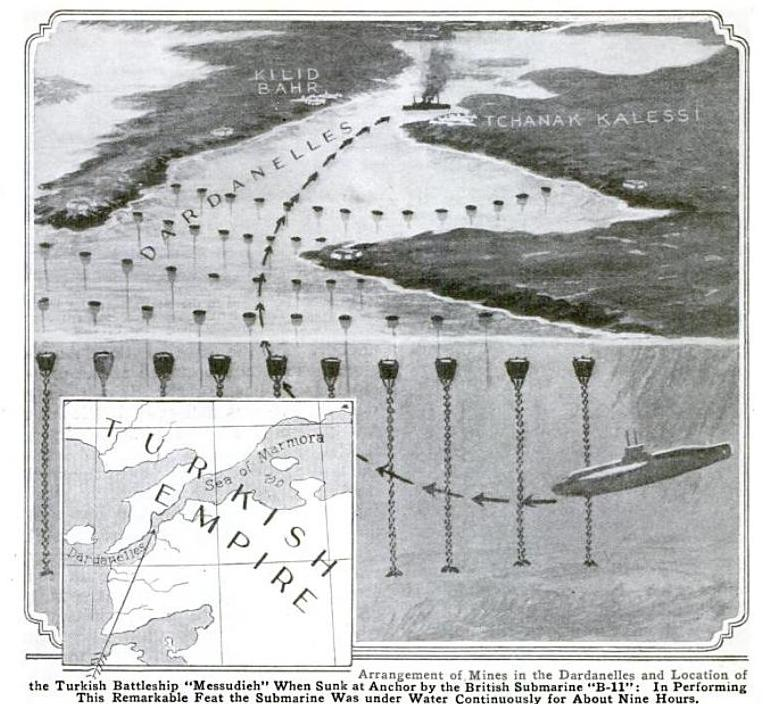
Illustration of the Dardanelles raid leading to the sinking of Mesudiye

In late July 1914, World War I broke out in Europe, though the Ottomans initially remained neutral. On 6 September 1914, Mesudiye was sent to Nara to protect the minefields guarding the entrance to the Dardanelles. She was supported by the minelayer Nusret and the tug Intibah. Tensions between the Ottomans and a British fleet patrolling the entrance to the Dardanelles increased until 5 November, when Britain and France declared war on the Ottoman Empire.

On the morning of 13 December, the British submarine B11, commanded by Lieutenant Norman Holbrook, entered the Dardanelles. At around 11:30, she spotted Mesudiye at anchor and fired a single torpedo from a distance of 750 m (2,460 ft). The torpedo hit the ship's stern and caused serious damage; Mesudiye's guns briefly fired at B11's periscope before the ship capsized and sank in shallow water. Casualties were light, with only 10 officers and 27 enlisted men killed in the attack. A salvage effort removed the 150 mm and 76 mm guns, which were used to strengthen the defenses of the Dardanelles. In the meantime, B11 successfully passed back through the Dardanelles and returned to port; Holbrook was awarded the Victoria Cross for sinking Mesudiye.

Mesudiye's salvaged 150 mm guns were installed as "Battery Mesudiye" in the Dardanelles. These guns played a role in the sinking of the French battleship Bouvet on 18 March 1915, having hit the ship eight times—one of which disabled her forward turret—before she struck a mine and sank with very heavy loss of life.
