= Battle of Elli =

Naval battle during the First Balkan War

- Part of the First Balkan War
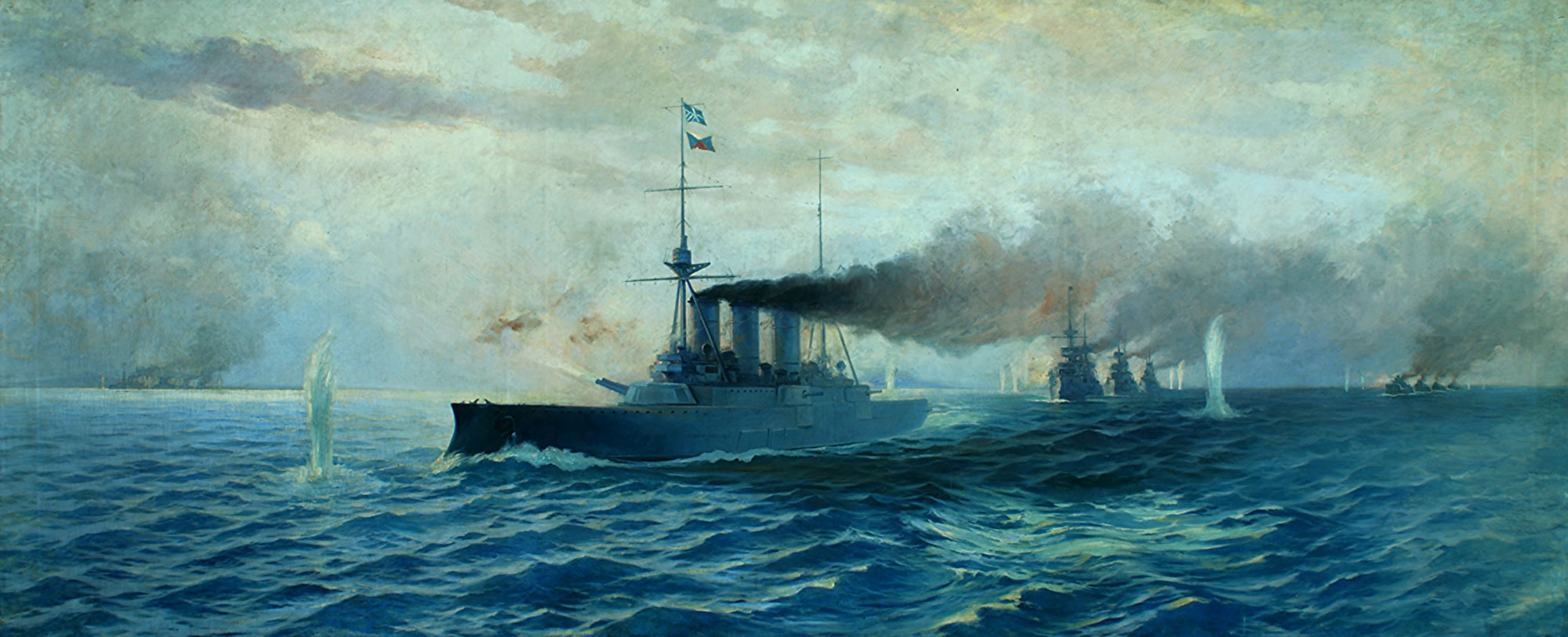
- Battle of Elli, Vasileios Hatzis.
Date	16 December [O.S. 3 December] 1912
Location	Off the Dardanelles, Aegean Sea 40.2°N 26.4°E
Result	Greek victory

Belligerents
(Kingdom of Greece) Greece	Ottoman Empire

Commanders and leaders
Pavlos Kountouriotis	Ramiz Bey

Strength
1 armoured cruiser 3 ironclad battleships 4 destroyers	3 battleships 1 ironclad 1 protected cruiser 4 destroyers

Casualties and losses
2 killed	18 killed 41 wounded 1 battleship damaged

The Battle of Elli (Greek: Ναυμαχία της Έλλης, Turkish: İmroz Deniz Muharebesi) or the Battle of the Dardanelles took place near the mouth of the Dardanelles on 16 December [O.S. 3 December] 1912 as part of the First Balkan War between the fleets of the Kingdom of Greece and the Ottoman Empire. It was the largest sea battle of the Balkan Wars.

== Background ==
Since the start of the war the Royal Hellenic Navy acted aggressively, while the Ottoman Navy remained in the Dardanelles. Rear Admiral Pavlos Kountouriotis landed at Lemnos, while the Greek fleet captured a series of islands. On 24 October (O.S.), Kountouriotis sent a telegram to the Ottoman admiral: "We have captured Tenedos. We await the exit of your fleet. If you need coal, I can supply you." On 3 December (OS), the Ottoman fleet left the Dardanelles.

== Battle ==
The Royal Hellenic Navy, led by Kountouriotis on board of the flagship Averof, defeated the Ottoman Navy, led by Captain Ramiz Bey, just outside the entrance to the Dardanelles (Hellespont). During the battle, Kountouriotis, frustrated by the slow speed of the three older Greek ironclads Hydra, Spetsai and Psara, hoisted the Z flag which stood for "Independent Action", and sailed forward alone at a speed of 20 knots, against the Ottoman fleet. Taking full advantage of her superior speed, guns and armour, Averof succeeded in crossing the Ottoman fleet's "T" and concentrated her fire against the Ottoman flagship Barbaros Hayreddin, thus forcing the Ottoman fleet to retreat in disorder. The Greek fleet, including the destroyers Aetos, Ierax and Panthir continued to pursue the Ottoman fleet off-and-on between December 13 and December 26, 1912.

== Aftermath ==
The Ottomans suffered 7 killed and 14 wounded on the Barbaros Hayreddin, 8 killed and 20 wounded on the Turgut Reis, and 3 dead and 7 wounded on the Mesudiye.

This victory was quite significant in that the Ottoman Navy retreated within the Straits and left the Aegean Sea to the Greeks who were now free to take the islands of Lesbos, Chios, Lemnos and Samos and others. It also prevented any transfer of Ottoman troop reinforcements by sea and effectively secured Ottoman defeat on land.

== See also ==
- Greek cruiser Elli (1912)
- Greek cruiser Elli (1935)
- Greek frigate Elli (F450)
