= Ottoman cruiser Hamidiye =

Protected cruiser of the Ottoman Navy

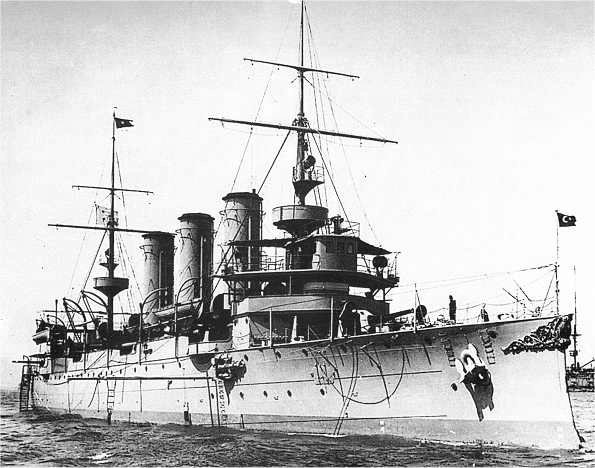
- Ottoman cruiser Hamidiye

History

Ottoman Empire
- Name: Hamidiye
- Namesake: Sultan Abdülhamid II
- Ordered: 1900
- Builder: Sir W. G. Armstrong, Whitworth & Co. Ltd., Newcastle
- Yard number: 732
- Laid down: April 1902
- Launched: 25 September 1903
- Commissioned: April 1904
- Honours and awards: Cruiser Hamidiye Medal 1913
- Fate: Under British control 1918–1925, then ceded to the Turkish Navy.

Turkey
- Name: Hamidiye
- Commissioned: 1925
- Decommissioned: March 1947
- Fate: Sold for scrap, 10 September 1964
- Notes: Used for cadet training 1940-47

General characteristics Hamidiye
- Type: Protected cruiser
- Displacement: 3,904 tons (normal)
- Length: 112 m (367 ft) (LOA); 103.6 m (340 ft) (LPP)
- Beam: 14.5 m (48 ft)
- Draught: 4.8 m (16 ft)
- Propulsion: Machinery: Steam, 3 shafts; Engines: 2 × VTE 4-cylinder engines producing 12,000 ihp, Hawthorn Leslie and Company; Boilers: 16 × Niclausse water-tube boilers
- Speed: 22.2 knots (full speed in trials); 16 knots (normal cruising speed)
- Complement: 400 (1904); 355 (1915)
- Armament: 2 × 150mm QF L/45 guns; 8 × 120mm QF L/45 guns; (150mm/45 & 4.7"/45 guns replaced after WW1 by 5 x 15 cm SK L/35 guns); 6 × 47mm QF L/50 guns; 6 × 37mm QF guns; 2 × 457mm torpedo tubes; 70 × mines

Hamidiye (Note: The name is also sometimes rendered as Hamidieh in English; see Gardiner and Gray, p. 389, and Halpern, p. 228. Also it was rendered Hamidié in French. See "L'entree du Hamidié à Odessa". Servet-i Fünun. 20 June 1918. p. unstated.) was an Ottoman cruiser that saw extensive action during the Balkan Wars and World War I. Initially named Abdül Hamid, it was ordered by the Ottoman Navy in 1900 from the British shipbuilding company Armstrong Whitworth. It was laid down in Elswick, Newcastle, in April 1902; launched on 25 September 1903; its sea trials began on 17 December 1903; and it was commissioned in April 1904. It weighed 3,904 tons; was 112 m long with a beam of 14.5 m and a draught of 4.8 m; and was named after the Ottoman Sultan Abdülhamid II.

It had two 150mm L/45 quick firing guns, eight 120mm L/45 quick firing guns, six 47mm L/50 quick firing guns, six 37mm quick firing guns, and two 457mm torpedo tubes. Hamidiye was powered by two sets of four-cylinder triple expansion steam engines providing a top speed of 22.2 knots and carried a nominal complement of 400 (in 1904) and 355 (in 1915).

Its name Abdül Hamid was changed to Hamidiye after the 1908 Young Turk Revolution. Under the terms of the Treaty of Sèvres, which ended the First World War between the Allies and the Ottoman Empire, the ship was to be handed over to the United Kingdom as war compensation. However, the ensuing Turkish War of Independence culminated in the abrogation of the Treaty of Sèvres; it was replaced by the Treaty of Lausanne, which permitted the new Turkish republic to retain its fleet, including Hamidiye, which became a training ship.

== Design ==
=== General characteristics ===
Hamidiye was 112 m (367 ft) long (length overall) (103.6 m (340 ft) between perpendiculars) and had a beam of 47 ft 6 in (14.48 m) and a draft of 16 ft (4.88 m). The ship displaced 3,904 t (3,842 long tons; 4,303 short tons) with a normal load. She was protected by Krupp armor. The armor system consisted of an internal protective deck: the horizontal portions above the waterline amidships were 1.5 in (3.8 cm) thick, while the slopes on the sides of the ship, which extended below the waterline, were 4 in (10 cm) thick. Hamidiye was powered by 2-shaft vertical triple expansion engines, which were supplied with steam by cylindrical boilers. The power plant was rated at 12,500 indicated horsepower, which produced a top speed of 22.2 knots (41.1 km/h; 25.5 mph).

=== Armament ===
Hamidiye was armed with a wide array of medium and smaller caliber guns. The largest of these were two 6 in (15 cm) /45 Armstrong quick-firing guns each on a centre-pivot mounting with an open-backed gunshield, one forward and one aft. These guns fired 100 lb (45 kg) projectiles at a rate of 5 to 7 rounds per minute. The mounts allowed elevation to 20°, which provided a maximum range of 14,600 yards (13,350 m). Eight 4.7 in (12 cm) /50 Armstrong quick-firing guns rounded out the primary armament; these were placed in single shielded centre-pivot mounts on broadside amidships, four on either side.

Secondary weapons consisted of six 3-pounder guns and six 1-pounder guns, each mounted in single emplacements. Hamidiye also carried a pair of 18 in (46 cm) torpedo tubes; these were emplaced in two aim-able mounts underneath the forebridge.

After the First World War, Hamidiye was rearmed; both types of primary guns were removed, and replaced with 5.9 in (15 cm) SK L/45 and 3 in (7.6 cm) SK L/50 Krupp guns.

== Service history ==
=== 1908–1909 ===
Hamidiye was involved in putting down a Greek uprising at Samos Island in 1908. In 1909 it was attached to the army which, under Mahmud Şevket Pasha, marched on Istanbul to put down the counter-revolution (31 March Incident), and anchored off Yeşilköy, across from Sevket Pasha's headquarters.

=== Balkan Wars ===
Hamidiye fought in the Balkan Wars under the command of Captain Rauf Orbay, and was the only Ottoman ship to distinguish itself in the conflict. In November 1912, while shelling Bulgarian positions during the First Balkan War, Hamidiye was damaged in the Battle of Kaliakra by the Bulgarian torpedo boat Drazki, though Orbay claimed to have sunk two other torpedo boats. The torpedo tore a 10 ft (3.0 m) hole in her bow on the starboard side, and killed eight men. Though the bow was mostly submerged, it was able to withdraw back to home port for repairs. On 14 January 1913, Hamidiye slipped through the Greek naval blockade of the Dardanelles under cover of night, and proceeded to raid Greek shipping in the Aegean. The next day, at Syros, it sank the Greek armed merchant cruiser Macedonia and shelled the town of Ermoupoli. From there it set sail to Beirut and Port Said. The raids of Hamidiye and its ability to roam around the Mediterranean and sow confusion, disrupt shipping and destroy various ships and facilities while avoiding its pursuers became a major morale booster for the Ottomans. The main aim of its sally however, to draw away the Greek cruiser Georgios Averof so as to enable the Ottoman fleet to tackle the rest of the Greek navy in support of the Ottoman land forces, failed.

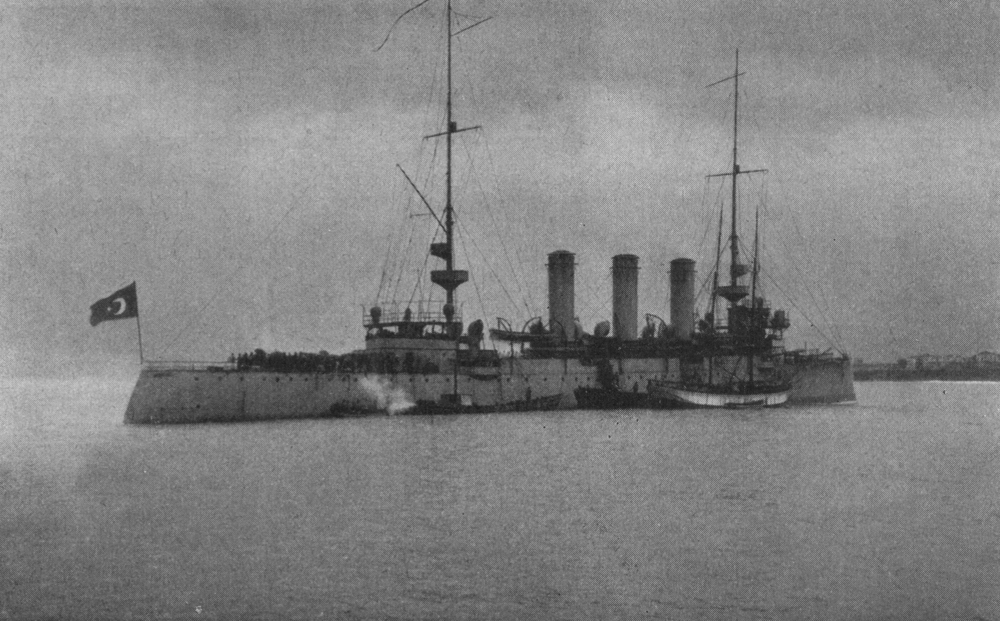
Ottoman cruiser Hamidiye in 1913

Orbay then led his ship to shell Greek and Serbian positions on the coast of Albania. On 12 March 1913 Hamidiye attacked 13 Greek merchant ships offloading Serbian troops (bound from Salonika) in the port of San Giovanni di Medua, Albania. She managed to sink or heavily damage six Greek ships and also damaged a neutral Austrian ship, as well as shell the Serbian military encampment there but, mindful of the lack of friendly ports nearby where repairs could be affected, Orbay opted to open the range by a few kilometers when a pair of Serbian mountain guns started firing back from the deck of the merchant ship Trifimia. This, combined with poor Ottoman gunnery and limited shell stocks saved the allies from further damage. The whole incident sparked a furious complaint from the Serbs about a lack of protection by the Hellenic Navy of their chartered transports, compelling the Greeks to escort further convoys with the ironclad Psara. Meanwhile, Hamidiye managed to evade the Greek destroyers sent to find it, and set sail for Egypt. Another sortie south of Crete led to the capture of another Greek merchantman, but reports of Greek warships near Rhodes forced Hamidiye, whose boilers were damaged and reduced her speed, to seek refuge in the Red Sea, where it sat out the end of the war.

=== World War I ===
Ottoman cruiser Hamidiye (right) as seen from the battlecruiser Yavûz Sultân Selîm at the İzmit Naval Base in the Sea of Marmara

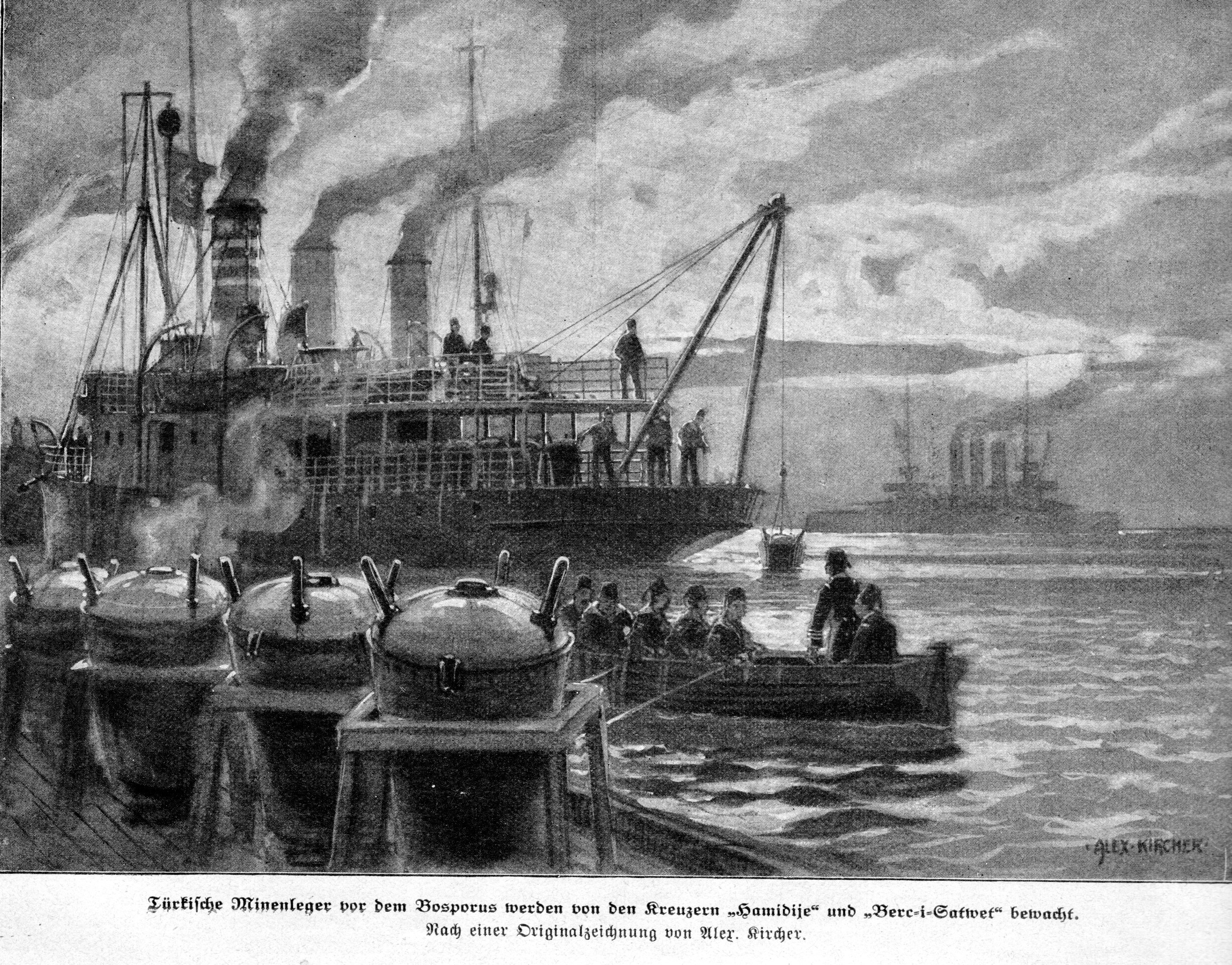
Türkische Minenleger vor dem Bosporus werden um 1915 von den Kreuzern HAMIDIJE und BERC-I-SATWET bewacht

During World War I, it fought against the Russian Navy in Black Sea and joined Yavûz Sultân Selîm and Midilli in maintaining control over Black Sea lanes and ports. It engaged in numerous naval battles, was hit many times. Hamidiye conducted a series of operations in company with Yavûz and Midilli; on 23 September 1914, Hamidiye sailed with Yavûz to Trabzon to escort three transports. In November it bombarded military installations at Russian port Tuapse. The ship sortied again in January 1915 along with Midilli; on 9 January the two ships accidentally encountered the Russian fleet off Yalta. In the brief engagement, Midilli hit the Russian battleship Evstafi once. On their return they were pursued by ships of the Russian fleet. The recently repaired Yavûz steamed out of the Bosporus to cover the arrival of Hamidiye and Midilli and force off the pursuing Russians.

=== Post World War I ===
The war between the Allies and the Ottoman Empire was ended with the signing of the Treaty of Sèvres on 10 August 1920; according to the terms of the treaty, Hamidiye, along with Yavûz and several other warships, were to be ceded to Great Britain as war reparations. However, the Turkish War of Independence, led by Mustafa Kemal Atatürk, eventually created a new Turkish state; the Treaty of Sèvres was discarded, and the Treaty of Lausanne was signed in its place. Under the terms of this treaty, the new Turkish republic regained possession of much its fleet. It was the first Ottoman warship to be transferred to the Turkish Navy in 1925.

On 23 October 1937, Hamidiye was involved in a collision with Ordu at Beşiktaş. Ordu sank with the loss of two crew members.

== Awards ==
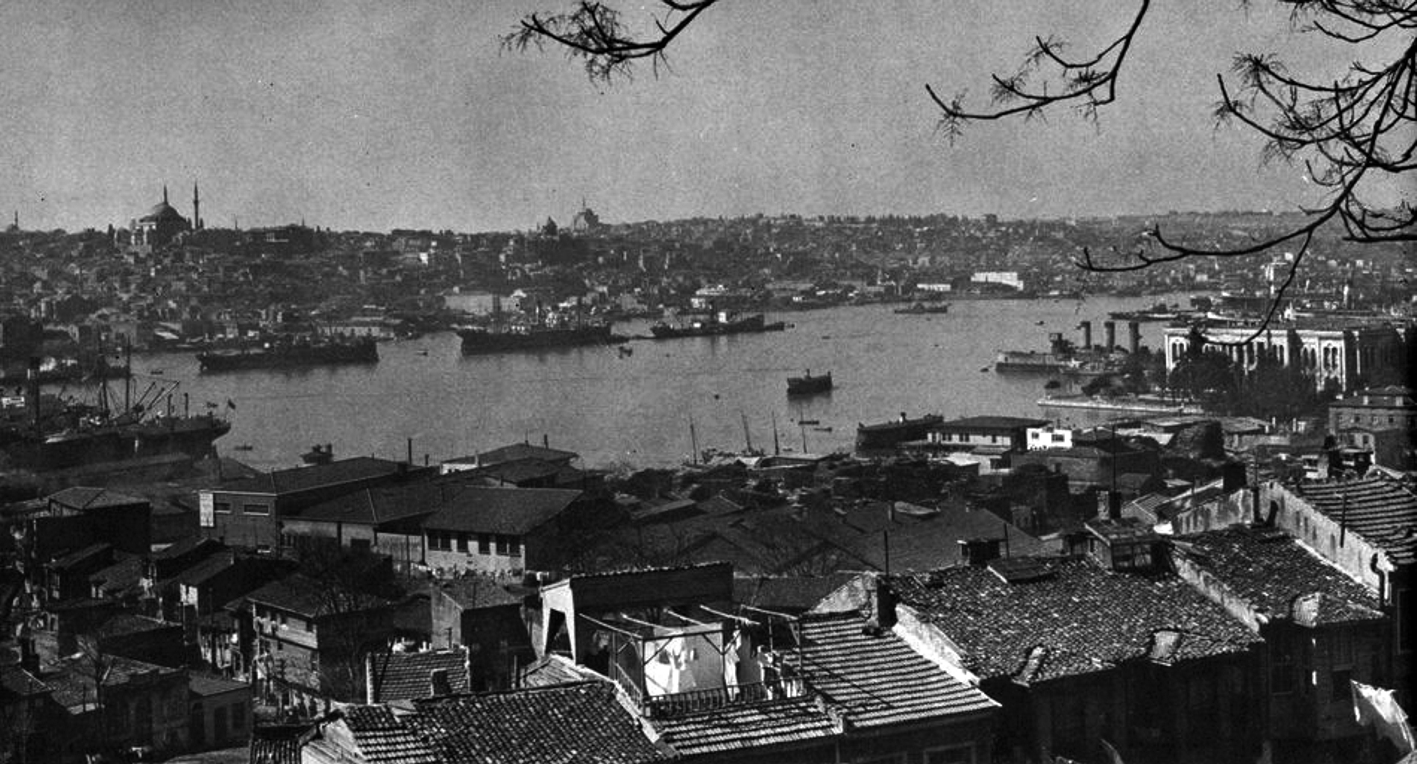
View of the Golden Horn near Istanbul, 1955. Hamidiye can be seen laid up at the right.

The only commemorative military medal issued by the Ottomans for the Balkan Wars was the Cruiser Hamidiye Medal 1913, which was given to each of the ship's 394 crew members.

The ship was decommissioned in March 1947 after a service of training cadets since 1940. For a short while between 1949 and 1951, it was a museum ship anchored at the port of the Kabataş quarter in Istanbul, on the European shoreline of the Bosphorus. Hamidiye was then laid up at the Golden Horn between 1951 and 1964, until it was sold for scrap on 10 September 1964. It was then towed to the Paşabahçe quarter in the Beykoz district of Istanbul, on the Anatolian shoreline of the Bosphorus, and its breaking-up was completed there in 1966.

== Bibliography ==
=== Books ===
- Gardiner, Robert; Gray, Randal, eds. (1985). Conway's All the World's Fighting Ships 1906–1921. Annapolis: Naval Institute Press. ISBN 0-87021-907-3.
- Gardiner, Robert; Chesneau, Roger; Kolesnik, Eugene M., eds. (1979). Conway's All the World's Fighting Ships 1860–1905. London: Conway Maritime Press. ISBN 0-85177-133-5.
- Hall, Richard C. (2000). The Balkan Wars, 1912–1913: prelude to the First World War. Routledge. ISBN 978-0-415-22946-3.
- Hough, Richard (1966). The Big Battleship. Periscope Publishing Ltd. ISBN 978-1-904381-14-3.
- İnci, Tevfik (1952). Hamidiye's Raids During The Balkan Wars (Balkan Harbinde Hamidiye Kruvazörünün Akın Harekâtı) (in Turkish). Istanbul, Turkey: Deniz Basımevi.
- David Nicolle and Raffaele Ruggeri, The Ottoman Army 1914–18, Osprey Publishing Ltd., 1994.
- Saraçoğlu, A Cemaleddin (2006). Rauf Orbay and Hamidiye : Veteran Hamidiye's Glory and Adventures (Rauf Orbay ve Hamidiye : Gazi Hamidiye'nin şanlı maceraları) (in Turkish). Istanbul, Turkey: Yeditepe.
- Sondhaus, Lawrence (2001). Naval warfare, 1815–1914. Routledge. ISBN 978-0-415-21478-0.

=== Online ===
- DiGiulian, Tony. "Navweaps.com: Naval Weapons, Naval Technology and Naval Reunions". Bucks County, Pennsylvania.
