= SMS Brandenburg =

Battleship of the German Imperial Navy

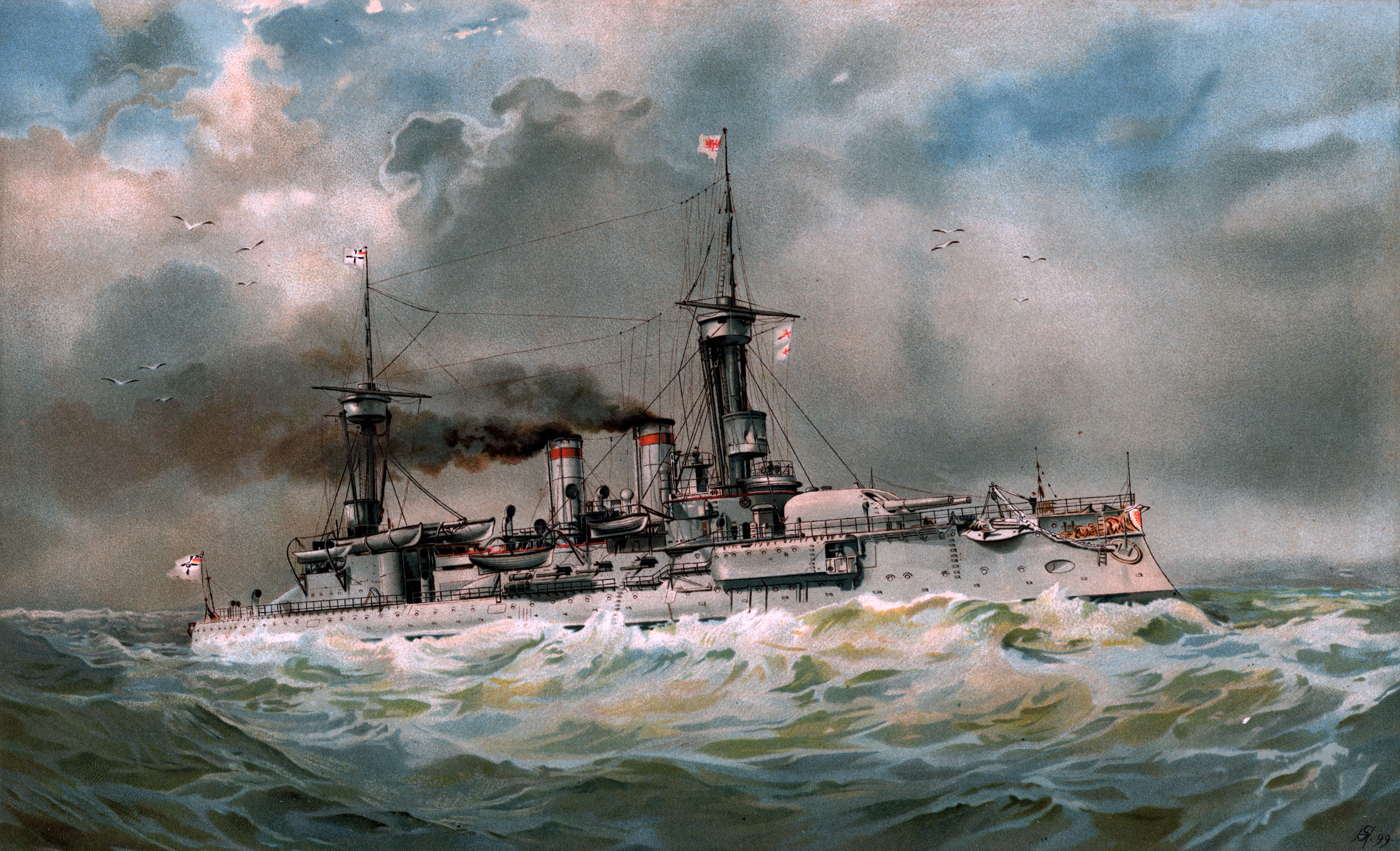
- Lithograph of SMS Brandenburg in 1902

History

German Empire
- Name: Brandenburg
- Namesake: Province of Brandenburg
- Builder: AG Vulcan Stettin
- Laid down: May 1890
- Launched: 21 September 1891
- Commissioned: 19 November 1893
- Fate: Scrapped in 1920

General characteristics
- Class & type: Brandenburg-class battleship
- Displacement: Normal: 10,013 t (9,855 long tons); Full load: 10,670 t (10,500 long tons)
- Length: 115.7 m (379 ft 7 in) loa
- Beam: 19.5 m (64 ft)
- Draft: 7.6 m (24 ft 11 in)
- Installed power: 12 × Scotch marine boilers; 10,000 metric horsepower (9,900 ihp)
- Propulsion: 2 × screw propellers; 2 × triple-expansion steam engines
- Speed: 16.5 knots (30.6 km/h; 19.0 mph)
- Range: 4,300 nautical miles (8,000 km; 4,900 mi) at 10 knots (19 km/h; 12 mph)
- Complement: 38 officers; 530 enlisted men
- Armament: 4 × 28 cm (11 in) MRK L/40 caliber guns; 2 × 28 cm (11 in) MRK L/35 caliber guns; 8 × 10.5 cm (4.1 in) SK L/35 guns; 8 × 8.8 cm (3.5 in) SK L/30 guns; 3 × 45 cm (17.7 in) torpedo tubes
- Armor: Belt: 400 mm (15.7 in); Barbettes: 300 mm (11.8 in); Deck: 60 mm (2.4 in)

SMS Brandenburg (Note: "SMS" stands for "Seiner Majestät Schiff", or "His Majesty's Ship" in German.) was the lead ship of the Brandenburg-class pre-dreadnought battleships, which included Kurfürst Friedrich Wilhelm, Weissenburg, and Wörth, built for the German Kaiserliche Marine (Imperial Navy) in the early 1890s. She was the first pre-dreadnought built for the German Navy; earlier, the navy had only built coastal defense ships and armored frigates. The ship was laid down at the AG Vulcan dockyard in 1890, launched on 21 September 1891, and commissioned into the German Navy on 19 November 1893. Brandenburg and her three sisters were unique for their time in that they carried six heavy guns instead of the four that were standard in other navies. She was named after the Province of Brandenburg.

Brandenburg served with I Division during the first decade of her service with the fleet. This period was generally limited to training exercises and goodwill visits to foreign ports. These training maneuvers were nevertheless very important to developing German naval tactical doctrine in the two decades before World War I, especially under the direction of Alfred von Tirpitz. The ship saw her first major deployment in 1900, when she and her three sister ships were deployed to China to suppress the Boxer Uprising. In the early 1900s, all four ships were heavily rebuilt. She was obsolete by the start of World War I and only served in a limited capacity, initially as a coastal defense ship. In December 1915, she was withdrawn from active service and converted into a barracks ship. Brandenburg was scrapped in Danzig (now Gdańsk, after the war, in 1920.

== Design ==
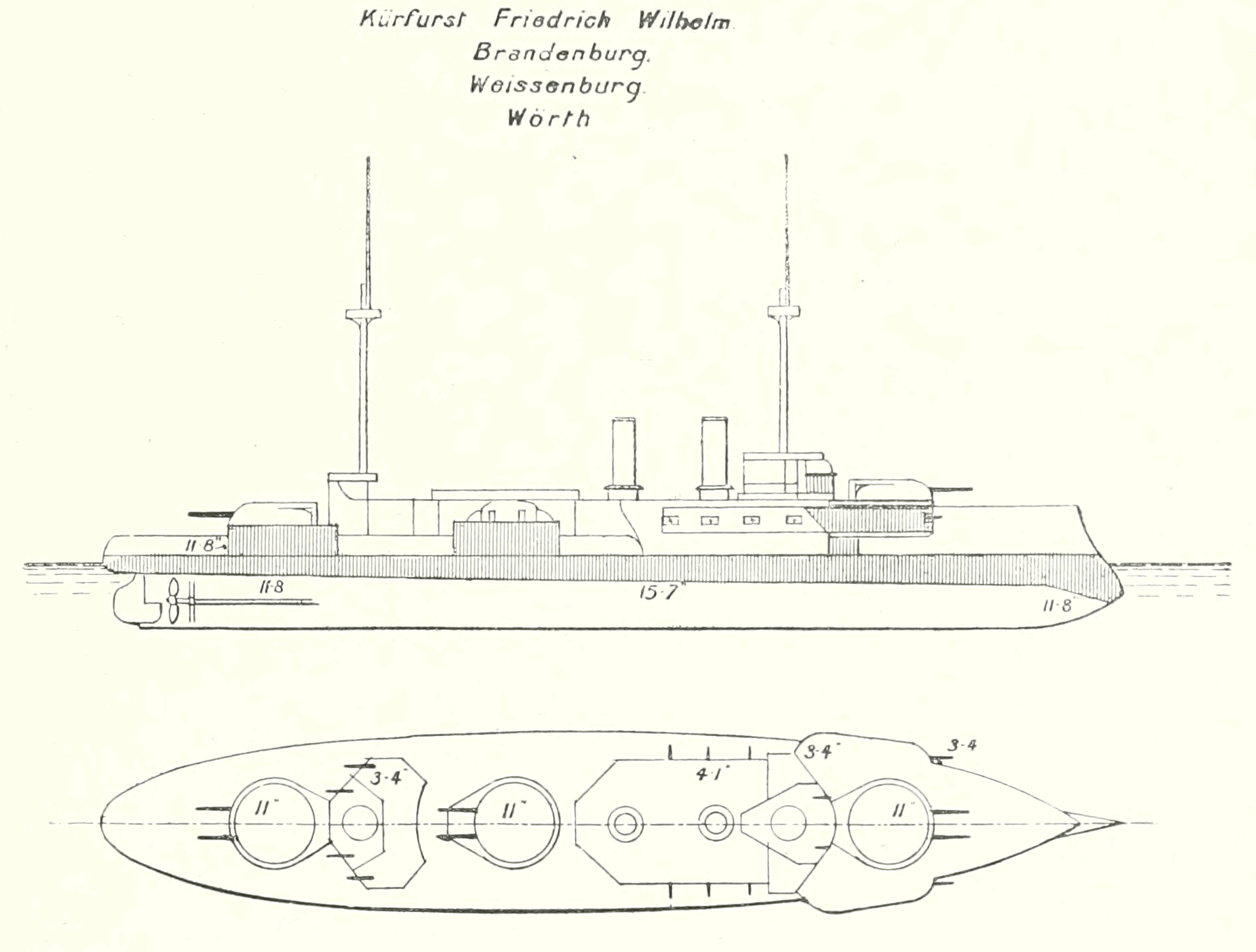
As depicted in Brassey's Naval Annual 1902

Brandenburg was the first pre-dreadnought battleship of the Kaiserliche Marine (Imperial Navy). Prior to the ascension of Kaiser Wilhelm II to the German throne in June 1888, the German fleet had been largely oriented toward defense of the German coastline and Leo von Caprivi, chief of the Reichsmarineamt (Imperial Naval Office), had ordered a number of coastal defense ships in the 1880s. In August 1888, the Kaiser, who had a strong interest in naval matters, replaced Caprivi with Vizeadmiral (VAdm—Vice Admiral) Alexander von Monts and instructed him to include four battleships in the 1889–1890 naval budget. Monts, who favored a fleet of battleships over the coastal defense strategy emphasized by his predecessor, cancelled the last four coastal defense ships authorized under Caprivi and instead ordered four 10,000-metric-ton (9,800-long-ton) battleships. Though they were the first modern battleships built in Germany, presaging the Tirpitz-era High Seas Fleet, the authorization for the ships came as part of a construction program that reflected the strategic and tactical confusion of the 1880s caused by the Jeune École (Young School).

Brandenburg and her sister ships—Kurfürst Friedrich Wilhelm, Weissenburg, and Wörth—were 115.7 m (379 ft 7 in) long, with a beam of 19.5 m (64 ft) and a draft of 7.6 m (24 ft 11 in). She displaced 10,013 t (9,855 long tons) as designed and up to 10,670 t (10,500 long tons) at full combat load. She was equipped with two sets of 3-cylinder vertical triple expansion steam engines that each drove a screw propeller. Steam was provided by twelve transverse cylindrical Scotch marine boilers. The ship's propulsion system was rated at 10,000 metric horsepower (9,900 ihp) and a top speed of 16.5 knots (30.6 km/h; 19.0 mph). She had a maximum range of 4,300 nautical miles (8,000 km; 4,900 mi) at a cruising speed of 10 knots (19 km/h; 12 mph). Her crew numbered 38 officers and 530 enlisted men.

The ship was unusual for her time in that she possessed a broadside of six heavy guns in three twin gun turrets, rather than the four-gun main battery typical of contemporary battleships. The forward and after turrets carried 28 cm (11 in) K L/40 guns, (Note: In Imperial German Navy gun nomenclature, "K" stands for Kanone (cannon), while the L/40 denotes the length of the gun. In this case, the L/40 gun is 40 caliber, meaning that the length of the gun barrel is 40 times the bore diameter.) while the amidships turret mounted a pair of 28 cm (11 in) guns with shorter L/35 barrels. Her secondary armament consisted of eight 10.5 cm (4.1 in) SK L/35 quick-firing guns mounted in casemates and eight 8.8 cm (3.45 in) SK L/30 quick-firing guns, also casemate mounted. Brandenburg's armament system was rounded out with six 45 cm (17.7 in) torpedo tubes, all in above-water swivel mounts. Although the main battery was heavier than other capital ships of the period, the secondary armament was considered weak in comparison to other battleships.

The ship was protected with compound armor. Her main belt armor was 400 millimeters (15.7 in) thick in the central citadel that protected the ammunition magazines and machinery spaces. The deck was 60 mm (2.4 in) thick. The main battery barbettes were protected with 300 mm (11.8 in) thick armor.

== Service history ==
=== Construction to 1896 ===
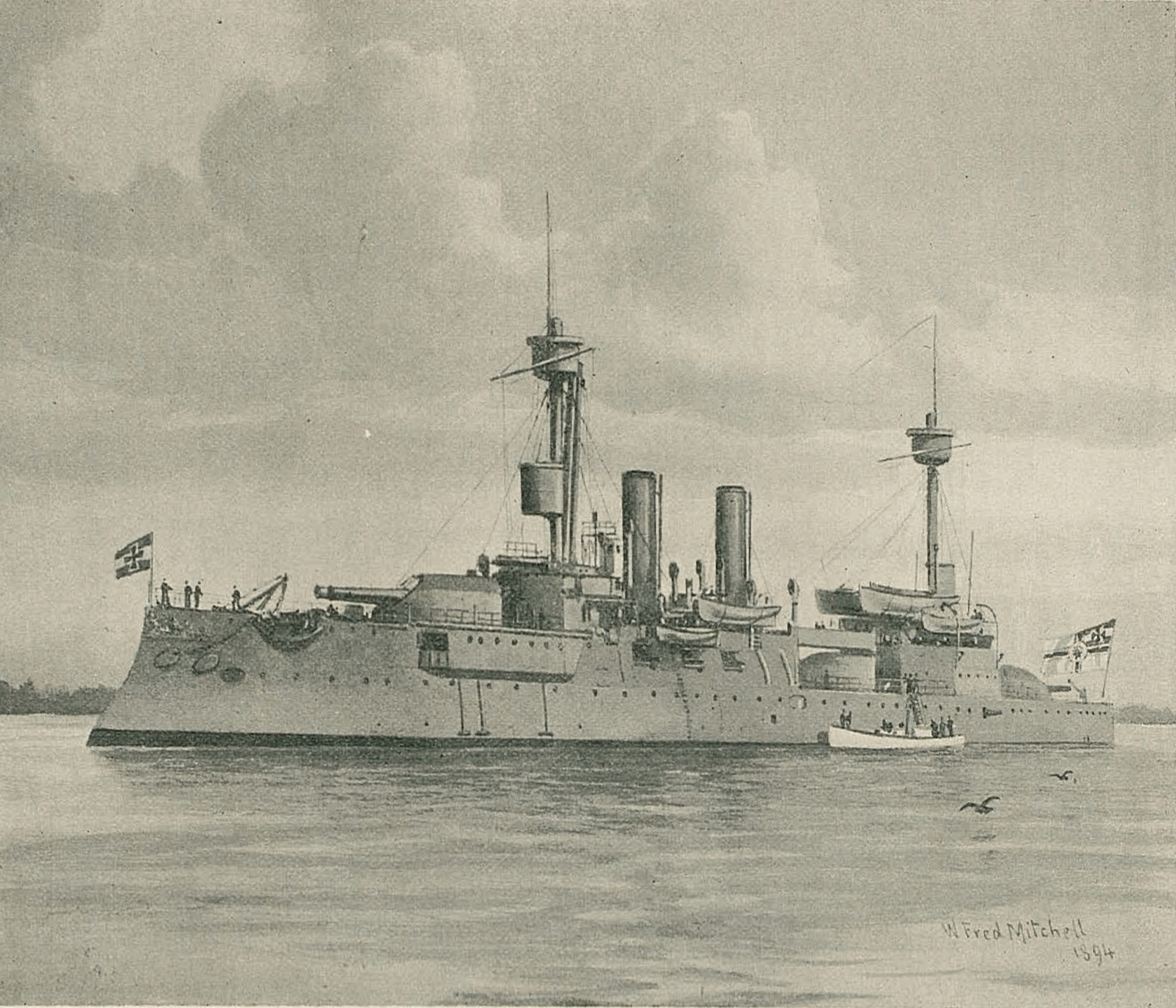
Illustration of Brandenburg by William Frederick Mitchell, c. 1894

Ordered as armored ship A, (Note: German warships were ordered under provisional names. Additions to the fleet were given a single letter; ships intended to replace older or lost vessels were ordered as "Ersatz (name of the ship to be replaced)".) Brandenburg was laid down at AG Vulcan in Stettin in May 1890. Her hull was completed by September 1891 and launched on 21 September, when she was christened by Wilhelm II. Fitting out work followed and was finished, with the exception of the installation of her guns, by the end of September 1893, when she was transferred to Kiel. There, her guns were mounted, and on 19 November Brandenburg was commissioned into the fleet. Sea trials began four days later; on the first day of trials, Wilhelm II and a delegation from the Brandenburg provincial government came aboard the ship to observe. On 27 December, the ship received a flag bearing the coat of arms of Brandenburg, which was flown on special occasions. At the end of the month, Brandenburg was formally assigned to II Division of the Maneuver Squadron.

Trials continued into 1894, and while conducting forced draft tests in Strander Bucht on 16 February, the ship suffered the worst machinery accident in the history of the Kaiserliche Marine. One of the main steam valves from the starboard boilers exploded, killing forty-four men in the boiler room and injuring another seven. The cause of the explosion was a defect in the construction of the valve. Prince Henry, aboard the nearby transport ship Pelikan, immediately ordered the ship to come to Brandenburg's aid, and took off the dead and wounded men. Brandenburg then put into Wiker Bucht, and was later towed to Kiel, where she entered the Kaiserliche Werft (Imperial Shipyard) for repairs. The accident caused a minor political incident after the press criticized Wilhelm II for failing to send Prince Henry to the funerals for the sailors. Additionally, VAdm Friedrich von Hollmann, the State Secretary of the Reichsmarineamt (Imperial Naval Office) stated before the Reichstag (Imperial Diet) that "such accidents could occur again and again", which increased parliamentary resistance to further increases in naval budgets; this led to an initial rejection of funds for the first armored cruiser, Fürst Bismarck. Admirals Eduard von Knorr and Hans von Koester criticized the comment, forcing Hollmann to publicly apologize.

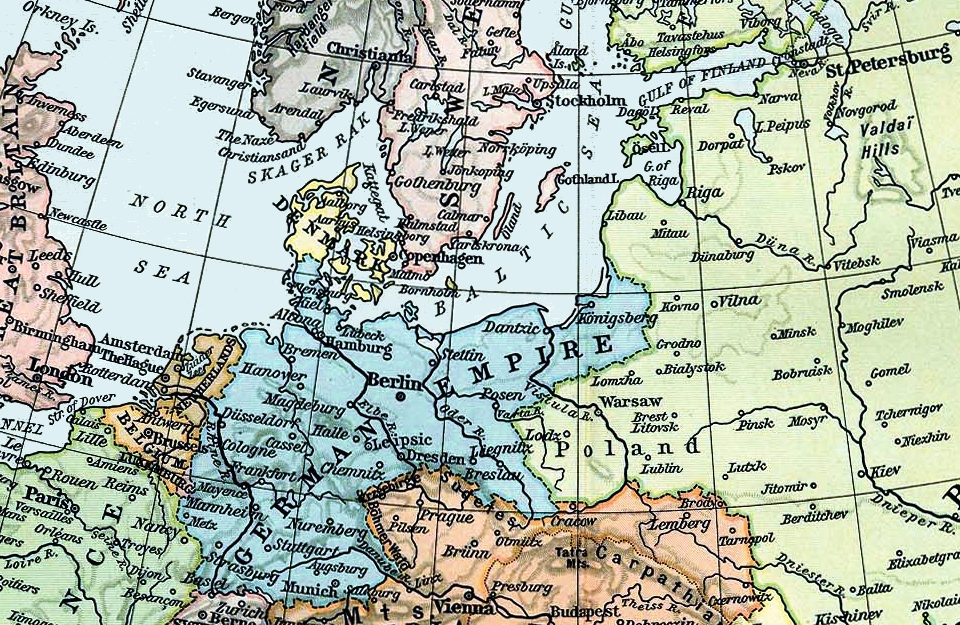
Map of the North and Baltic Seas in 1911

Repair work was completed by 16 April, allowing Brandenburg to return to trials which lasted until the middle of August, and included a cruise through the Kattegat. On 21 August, the ship joined II Division, though a reorganization of the fleet saw the ship transferred to I Division, along with her three sister ships. I Division was based in Wilhelmshaven in the North Sea. Brandenburg and the rest of the squadron attended ceremonies for the Kaiser Wilhelm Canal at Kiel on 3 December. The squadron thereafter began a winter training cruise in the Baltic Sea; this was the first such cruise by the German fleet. In previous years, the bulk of the fleet was deactivated for the winter months. During this voyage, I Division anchored in Stockholm from 7 to 11 December, during the 300th anniversary of the birth of Swedish king Gustavus Adolphus. King Oscar II held a reception for the visiting German delegation. Thereafter, further exercises were conducted in the Baltic before the ships had to put into their home ports for repairs.

The year 1895 began with what became the normal training cruises to Heligoland and then to Bremerhaven, with Wilhelm II onboard the flagship, Kurfürst Friedrich Wilhelm. This was followed by individual ship and divisional training, which was interrupted by a voyage to the northern North Sea, the first time that units of the main German fleet had left home waters. On this trip, Brandenburg joined Kurfürst Friedrich Wilhelm and the two battleships stopped in Lerwick in Shetland from 16 to 23 March. These exercises tested the ships in heavy weather; both vessels performed admirably. In May, more fleet maneuvers were carried out in the western Baltic, and they were concluded by a visit of the fleet to Kirkwall in Orkney. The squadron returned to Kiel in early June, where preparations were underway for the opening of the Kaiser Wilhelm Canal. Tactical exercises were carried out in Kiel Bay in the presence of foreign delegations to the opening ceremony. Further training exercises lasted until 1 July, when I Division began a voyage into the Atlantic Ocean. This operation had political motives; Germany had only been able to send a small contingent of vessels—the protected cruiser Kaiserin Augusta, the coastal defense ship Hagen, and the sailing frigate Stosch—to an international naval demonstration off the Moroccan coast at the same time. The main fleet could therefore provide moral support to the demonstration by steaming to Spanish waters. Rough weather again allowed Brandenburg and her sister ships to demonstrate their excellent seakeeping. The fleet departed Vigo and stopped in Queenstown, Ireland. Wilhelm II, aboard his yacht Hohenzollern, attended the Cowes Regatta while the rest of the fleet stayed off the Isle of Wight.

Illustration of Brandenburg

On 10 August, the fleet returned to Wilhelmshaven and began preparations for the autumn maneuvers later that month. The first exercises began in the Heligoland Bight on 25 August. The fleet then steamed through the Skagerrak to the Baltic; heavy storms caused significant damage to many of the ships and the torpedo boat S41 capsized and sank in the storms—only three men were saved. The fleet stayed briefly in Kiel before resuming exercises, including live-fire exercises, in the Kattegat and the Great Belt. During this period, on 22 August, Brandenburg collided with the aviso Jagd, though only the latter was damaged in the accident. The main maneuvers began on 7 September with a mock attack from Kiel toward the eastern Baltic. The next day, while she was in Kiel, Czar Nicholas II of Russia inspected Brandenburg during a visit to Germany. Subsequent maneuvers took place off the coast of Pomerania and in Danzig Bay. A fleet review for Wilhelm II off Jershöft concluded the maneuvers on 14 September. The rest of the year was spent on individual ship training. The year 1896 followed much the same pattern as the previous year. Individual ship training was conducted through April, followed by squadron training in the North Sea in late April and early May, which included a visit to the Dutch ports of Vlissingen and Nieuwediep. Further maneuvers, which lasted from the end of May to the end of July, took the squadron further north in the North Sea, frequently into Norwegian waters where the ships visited Bergen from 11 to 18 May. During the maneuvers, Wilhelm II and the Chinese viceroy Li Hongzhang observed a fleet review off Kiel. On 9 August, the training fleet assembled in Wilhelmshaven for the annual autumn fleet training.

=== 1897–1900 ===
Brandenburg and the rest of the fleet operated under the normal routine of individual and unit training in the first half of 1897. Early in the year, the naval command considered deploying I Division to another naval demonstration off Morocco to protest the murder of two German nationals there, but a smaller squadron of sailing frigates was sent instead. The typical routine was interrupted in early August when Wilhelm II and Kaiserin (Empress) Augusta went to visit the Russian imperial court; both divisions of I Squadron were sent to Kronstadt to accompany the Kaiser, who proceeded to the capital at Saint Petersburg. They had returned to Neufahrwasser in Danzig on 15 August, where the rest of the fleet joined them for the annual autumn maneuvers. These exercises reflected the tactical thinking of the new State Secretary of the Reichsmarineamt, Konteradmiral (KAdm—Rear Admiral) Alfred von Tirpitz, and the new commander of I Squadron, VAdm August von Thomsen. These new tactics stressed accurate gunnery, especially at longer ranges, though the necessities of the line-ahead formation led to a great deal of rigidity in the tactics. Thomsen's emphasis on shooting created the basis for the excellent German gunnery during World War I. The maneuvers were completed by 22 September in Wilhelmshaven.

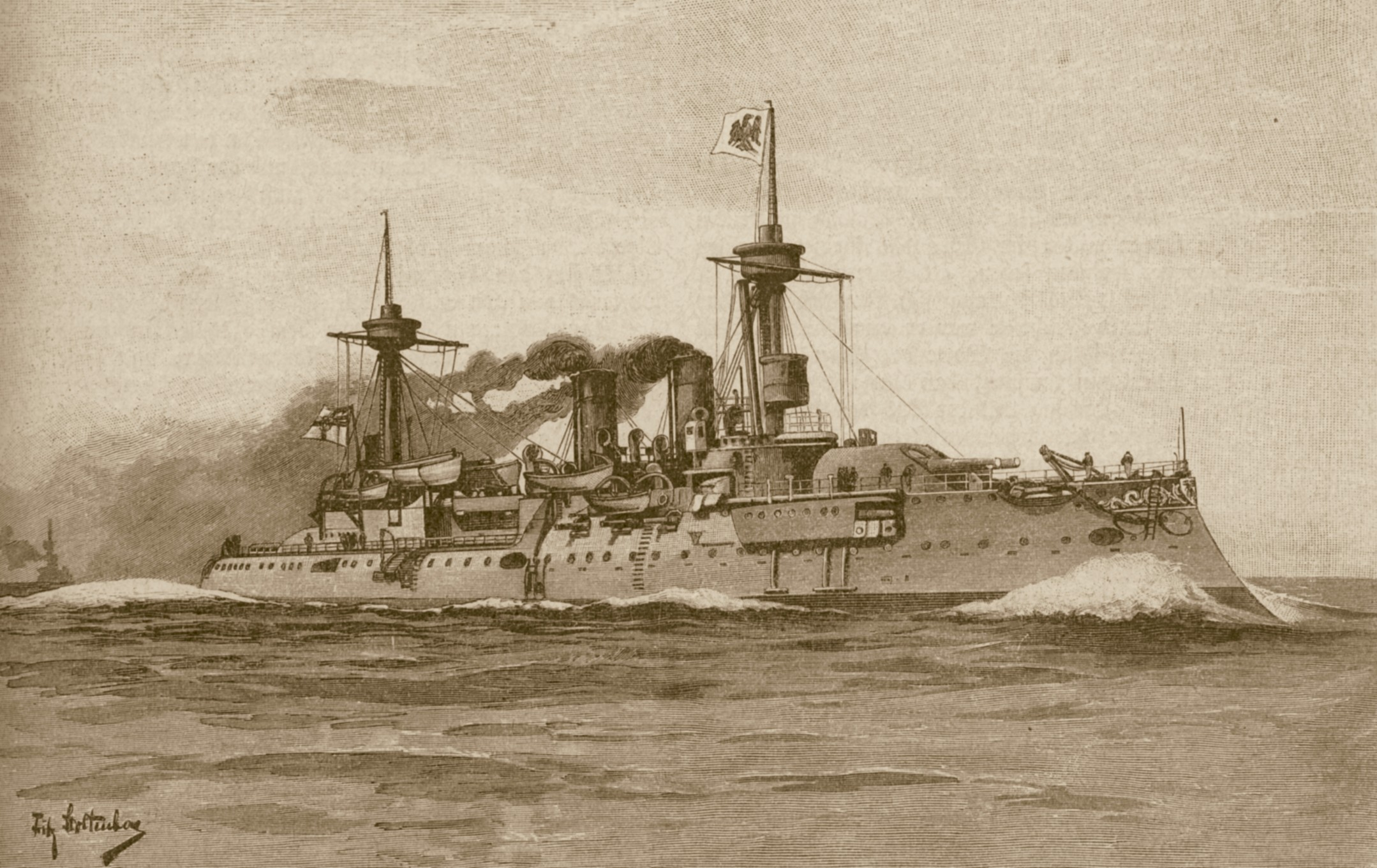
Brandenburg underway

In early December, I Division conducted maneuvers in the Kattegat and the Skagerrak, though they were cut short due to shortages in officers and men. Additionally, while steaming through the Great Belt, Brandenburg collided with the ironclad Württemberg, damaging both vessels and forcing them to put into Kiel for repairs. After temporary repairs to Brandenburg were completed, she moved to Wilhelmshaven, where a new ram bow had to be installed. The fleet followed the typical routine of individual and fleet training in 1898 without incident, though a voyage to the British Isles was also included and the fleet stopped in Queenstown, Greenock, and Kirkwall. The fleet assembled in Kiel on 14 August for the annual autumn exercises: the maneuvers included a mock blockade of the coast of Mecklenburg and a pitched battle with an "Eastern Fleet" in the Danzig Bay. While steaming back to Kiel, a severe storm hit the fleet, causing significant damage to many ships and sinking the torpedo boat S58. The fleet then transited the Kaiser Wilhelm Canal and continued the maneuvers in the North Sea. Training finished on 17 September in Wilhelmshaven. In December, I Division conducted artillery and torpedo training in Eckernförde Bay, followed by divisional training in the Kattegat and Skagerrak. During these maneuvers, the division visited Kungsbacka, Sweden, from 9 to 13 December. After returning to Kiel, the ships of I Division went into dock for their winter repairs.

During a snowstorm on 22 March 1899, the anchor chain for the ironclad Oldenburg broke, allowing the ship to drift out and run aground in Strander Bucht. Brandenburg and the shipyard steamer Norder towed Oldenburg free and back to port. On 5 April, the ship participated in the celebrations commemorating the 50th anniversary of the Battle of Eckernförde during the First Schleswig War. In May, I and II Divisions, along with the Reserve Division from the Baltic, went on a major cruise into the Atlantic. On the voyage out, I Division stopped in Dover and II Division went into Falmouth to restock their coal supplies. I Division joined II Division at Falmouth on 8 May, and the two units then departed for the Bay of Biscay, arriving at Lisbon on 12 May. There, they met the British Channel Fleet of eight battleships and four armored cruisers. The German fleet departed for Germany, stopping again in Dover on 24 May. There, they participated in the naval review celebrating Queen Victoria's 80th birthday. The fleet returned to Kiel on 31 May.

In July, the fleet conducted squadron maneuvers in the North Sea, which included coast defense exercises with soldiers from the X Corps. On 16 August, the fleet assembled in Danzig once again for the annual autumn maneuvers. The exercises started in the Baltic and on 30 August the fleet passed through the Kattegat and Skagerrak and steamed into the North Sea for further maneuvers in the German Bight, which lasted until 7 September. After a third phase of the maneuvers in the Kattegat and the Great Belt from 8 to 26 September, the fleet went into port for annual maintenance. The year 1900 began with the usual routine of individual and divisional exercises. In the second half of March, the squadrons met in Kiel, followed by torpedo and gunnery practice in April and a voyage to the eastern Baltic. From 7 to 26 May, the fleet went on a major training cruise to the northern North Sea, which included stops in Shetland from 12 to 15 May and in Bergen from 18 to 22 May. On 8 July, the ships of I Division were reassigned to II Division.

=== Boxer Uprising ===
During the Boxer Uprising in 1900, Chinese nationalists laid siege to the foreign embassies in Beijing and murdered Baron Clemens von Ketteler, the German plenipotentiary. The widespread violence against Westerners in China led to an alliance between Germany and seven other Great Powers: the United Kingdom, Italy, Russia, Austria-Hungary, the United States, France, and Japan. Those soldiers who were in China at the time were too few in number to defeat the Boxers; in Beijing there was a force of slightly more than 400 officers and infantry from the armies of the eight European powers. At the time, the primary German military force in China was the East Asia Squadron, which consisted of the protected cruisers Kaiserin Augusta, Hansa, and Hertha, the small cruisers Irene and Gefion, and the gunboats Jaguar and Iltis. There was also a German 500-man detachment in Taku; combined with the other nations' units the force numbered some 2,100 men. Led by the British Admiral Edward Seymour, these men attempted to reach Beijing but were forced to stop in Tianjin due to heavy resistance. As a result, the Kaiser determined an expeditionary force would be sent to China to reinforce the East Asia Squadron. The expedition included Brandenburg and her three sisters, six cruisers, ten freighters, three torpedo boats, and six regiments of marines, under the command of Generalfeldmarschall (General Field Marshal) Alfred von Waldersee.

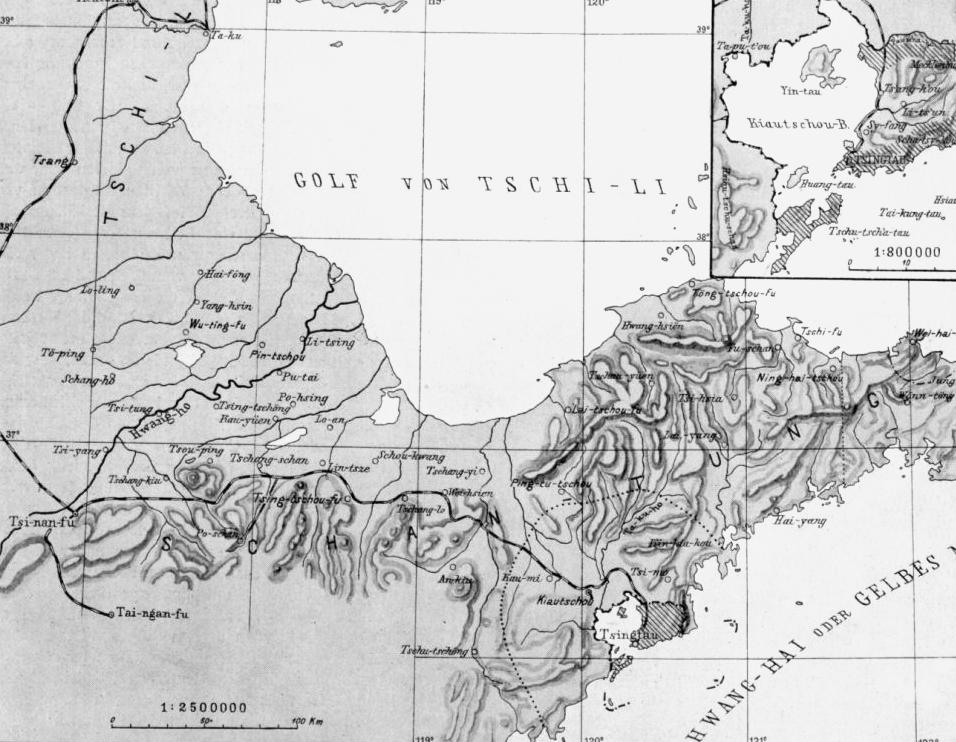
German 1912 map of the Shandong Peninsula showing the Jiaozhou Bay Leased Territory

On 7 July, KAdm Richard von Geißler, the expeditionary force commander, reported that his ships were ready for the operation, and they left two days later. The four battleships and the aviso Hela transited the Kaiser Wilhelm Canal and stopped in Wilhelmshaven to rendezvous with the rest of the expeditionary force. On 11 July, the force steamed out of the Jade Bight, bound for China. They stopped to coal at Gibraltar on 17–18 July and passed through the Suez Canal on 26–27 July. More coal was taken on at Perim in the Red Sea, and on 2 August the fleet entered the Indian Ocean. On 10 August, the ships reached Colombo, Ceylon, and on 14 August they passed through the Strait of Malacca. They arrived in Singapore on 18 August and departed five days later, reaching Hong Kong on 28 August. Two days later, the expeditionary force stopped in the outer roadstead at Wusong, downriver from Shanghai.

By the time the German fleet had arrived, the siege of Beijing had already been lifted by forces from other members of the Eight-Nation Alliance that had formed to deal with the Boxers. Nevertheless, Brandenburg took up patrol duties in the area surrounding the mouth of the Yangtze River, and in October participated in the occupations of the coastal fortifications protecting the cities of Shanhaiguan and Qinhuangdao before returning to the Yangtze. Since the situation had calmed, the four battleships were sent to Hong Kong or Nagasaki, Japan, in late 1900 and early 1901 for overhauls; Brandenburg went to Hong Kong for her overhaul in January and February 1901. After the work was completed, she steamed to Qingdao in the German Jiaozhou Bay Leased Territory, where she took part in training exercises with the rest of the expeditionary force.

On 26 May, the German high command recalled the expeditionary force to Germany. The fleet took on supplies in Shanghai and departed Chinese waters on 1 June. The ships stopped in Singapore from 10 to 15 June and took on coal before proceeding to Colombo, where they stayed from 22 to 26 June. Steaming against the monsoons forced the fleet to stop in Mahé, Seychelles, to take on more coal. The ships then stopped for a day each to take on coal in Aden and Port Said. On 1 August they reached Cádiz, and then met with I Division and steamed back to Germany together. They separated after reaching Helgoland, and on 11 August, after reaching the Jade roadstead, the ships of the expeditionary force were visited by Koester, who was now the Inspector General of the Navy. The following day the expeditionary fleet was dissolved. In the end, the operation cost the German government more than 100 million marks.

=== 1901–1914 ===
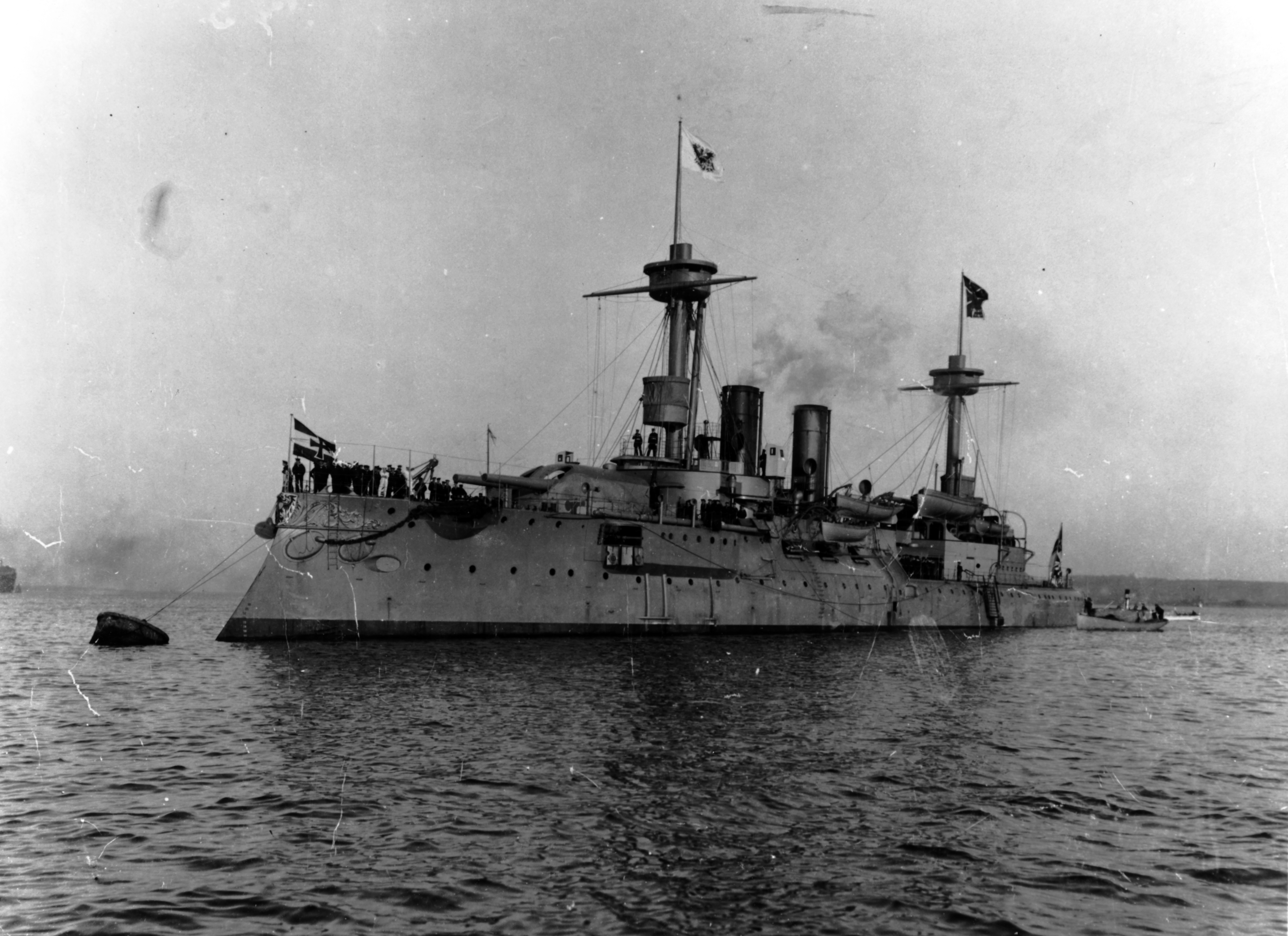
Brandenburg sometime after 1895

Upon their return, Brandenburg and her sisters were assigned to I Squadron. On 21 August, the annual fleet maneuvers began; these were interrupted on 11 September when Nicholas II visited the fleet while on another visit to Germany. The ships conducted a naval review for his visit in the Putziger Wiek. For the remainder of the maneuvers, the navy cooperated with the German Army in joint exercises in West Prussia that included the ships' Seebataillon (marines), and I Corps and XVII Corps. Later in the year, Brandenburg took part in a winter cruise, followed by a period in the shipyard in Wilhelmshaven for periodic maintenance. The year 1902 followed the routine pattern of individual, unit, and fleet training, along with a major cruise to Norway and Scotland, which concluded by passing through the English Channel. After completing the fleet maneuvers in August and September, Brandenburg was decommissioned on 23 October. The ship's crew were sent to man the newly commissioned battleship Zähringen, which took her place in I Squadron.

In the early 1900s, the four Brandenburgs were taken into the drydocks at the Kaiserliche Werft in Wilhelmshaven for major reconstruction. Brandenburg was modernized between 1903 and 1904. During the modernization, a second conning tower was added in the aft superstructure, along with a gangway. Brandenburg and the other ships had their boilers replaced with newer models, and also had the hamper amidships reduced. She was recommissioned on 4 April 1905 and was assigned to II Squadron of what was now renamed the Active Battlefleet, though she remained in service only briefly. She participated in the normal routine of training exercises through 1905, 1906, and 1907, before being decommissioned again on 30 September 1907. During this period, the only noteworthy incident involving Brandenburg was a minor grounding outside Stockholm that did not inflict any damage on the ship. Upon her second decommissioning, her crew was again sent to staff a new battleship, this time Hannover. Brandenburg was thereafter assigned to the Reserve Formation of the North Sea.

By 1910, the first dreadnought battleships began to enter service with the German fleet, rendering older vessels like Brandenburg obsolescent. That year, she temporarily returned to service with III Squadron to take part in the annual fleet maneuvers. After the exercises ended, she returned to what was now the Reserve Division of the North Sea, where she conducted further training. In mid-1911, she was transferred to the Training and Experimental Ships Unit, where she participated in training exercises in the Baltic. Brandenburg again temporarily returned to III Squadron for the fleet maneuvers in August and September, and on 16 October she was again decommissioned. In 1912, she was allocated to the Marinestation der Ostsee (Baltic Sea Naval Station), where she remained inactive for the following two years.

=== World War I and subsequent activity ===
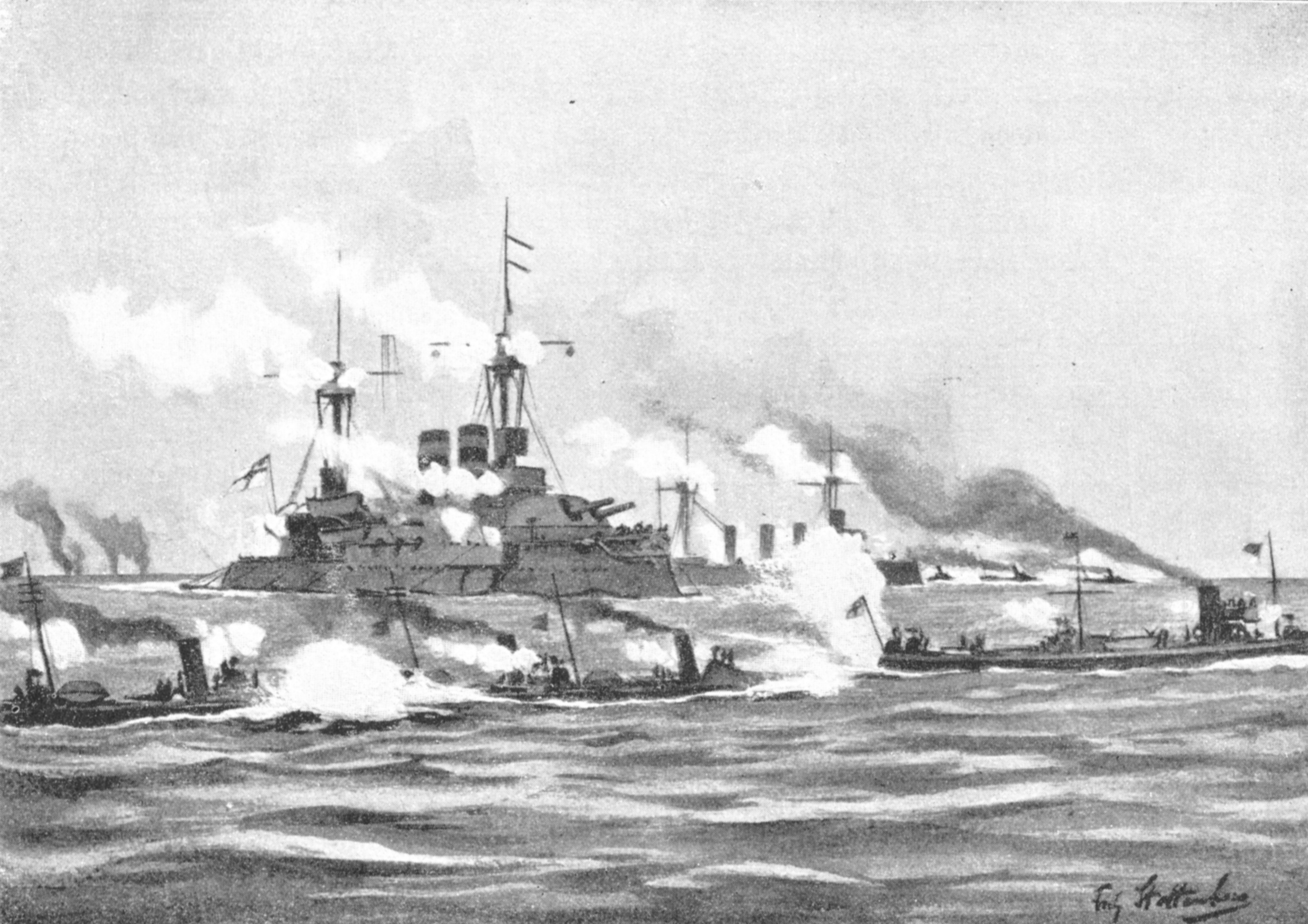
Illustration of a Brandenburg-class battleship with torpedo boats in the foreground

At the outbreak of World War I in August 1914, Brandenburg was reactivated and assigned to V Squadron, which was initially tasked with coastal defense duties in the North Sea. In mid-September, V Squadron was transferred to the Baltic, under the command of Prince Henry. He initially planned to launch a major amphibious assault on Windau, but a shortage of transports forced a revision of the plan. Instead, V Squadron was to carry the landing force, but this too was cancelled after Heinrich received false reports of British warships having entered the Baltic on 25 September. Brandenburg and the rest of the squadron returned to Kiel the following day, disembarked the landing force, and then proceeded to the North Sea, where they resumed guard ship duties. Before the end of the year, V Squadron was once again transferred to the Baltic. Prince Henry next ordered a foray toward Gotland. On 26 December, the battleships rendezvoused with the Baltic cruiser division in the Bay of Pomerania and then departed on the sortie. Two days later, the fleet arrived off Gotland to show the German flag, and was back in Kiel by 30 December.

The squadron returned to the North Sea for guard duties, but was withdrawn from front-line service in February 1915. Shortages of trained crews in the High Seas Fleet, coupled with the risk of operating older ships in wartime, necessitated the deactivation of the V Squadron ships. Brandenburg had her crew reduced in Kiel, and she was briefly assigned to the reserve division in the Baltic. From July to December, she underwent shipyard maintenance, before being transferred to Libau. On 20 December, she was decommissioned there, for use as a water distillation and barracks ship. Her heavy guns were removed for use in the Ottoman Empire, but there is no record of them ever having been shipped to the Ottomans. Near the end of the war, Brandenburg was taken back to Danzig, where work began to convert her into a target ship, but the war ended before the reconstruction was completed. Brandenburg was struck from the naval register on 13 May 1919 and sold for scrapping. The ship was purchased by Norddeutsche Tiefbaugesellschaft, a shipbreaking firm headquartered in Berlin, and she was then broken up for scrap in Danzig.
