= SMS Wörth =

Battleship of the German Imperial Navy

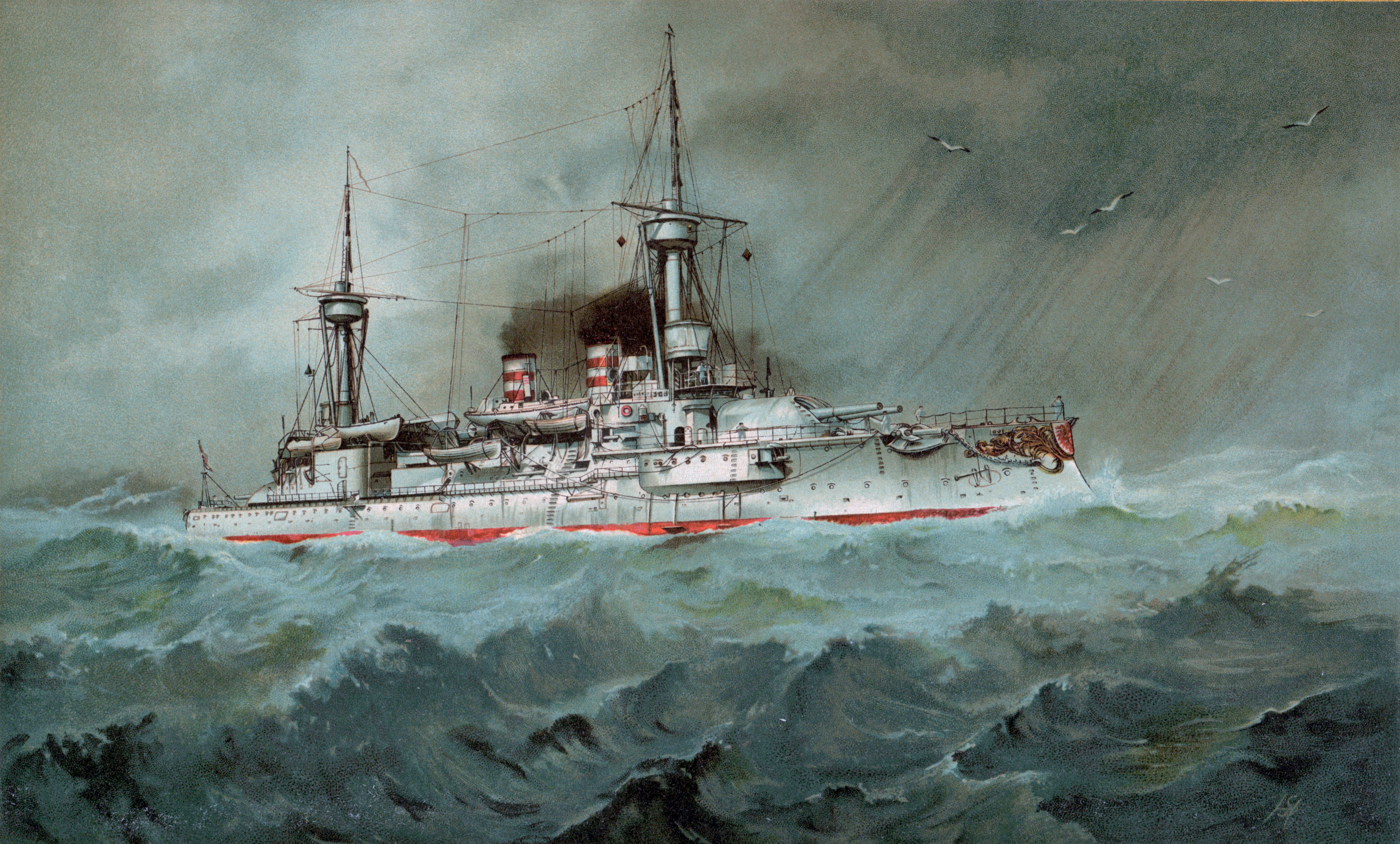
- A 1902 lithograph of Wörth

History

German Empire
- Name: Wörth
- Namesake: Battle of Wörth
- Builder: Germaniawerft, Kiel
- Laid down: 3 March 1890
- Launched: 6 August 1892
- Commissioned: 31 October 1893
- Fate: Scrapped in 1919

General characteristics
- Class & type: Brandenburg-class battleship
- Displacement: Normal: 10,013 t (9,855 long tons); Full load: 10,670 t (10,500 long tons)
- Length: 115.7 m (379 ft 7 in) loa
- Beam: 19.5 m (64 ft)
- Draft: 7.6 m (24 ft 11 in)
- Installed power: 12 × Scotch marine boilers; 10,000 metric horsepower (9,900 ihp)
- Propulsion: 2 × screw propellers; 2 × triple-expansion steam engines
- Speed: 16.5 knots (30.6 km/h; 19.0 mph)
- Range: 4,300 nmi (8,000 km; 4,900 mi) at 10 knots (19 km/h; 12 mph)
- Complement: 38 officers; 530 enlisted men
- Armament: 4 × 28 cm (11 in) MRK L/40 caliber guns; 2 × 28 cm (11 in) MRK L/35 caliber guns; 8 × 10.5 cm (4.1 in) SK L/35 guns; 8 × 8.8 cm (3.5 in) SK L/30 guns; 3 × 45 cm (17.7 in) torpedo tubes
- Armor: Belt: 400 mm (15.7 in); Barbettes: 300 mm (11.8 in); Deck: 60 mm (2.4 in)

SMS Wörth ("His Majesty's Ship Wörth") (Note: "SMS" stands for "Seiner Majestät Schiff", or "His Majesty's Ship" in German.) was one of four German pre-dreadnought battleships of the Brandenburg class, built in the early 1890s. The class also included Brandenburg, Kurfürst Friedrich Wilhelm, and Weissenburg. The ships were the first ocean-going battleships built for the Kaiserliche Marine (Imperial Navy). Wörth was laid down at the Germaniawerft dockyard in Kiel in May 1890. The ship was launched on 6 August 1892 and commissioned into the fleet on 31 October 1893. Wörth and her three sisters carried six heavy guns rather than four, as was standard for most other navies' battleships. She was named for the Battle of Wörth fought during the Franco-Prussian War of 1870–1871.

Wörth served in the German fleet for the first decade of her career, participating in the normal peacetime routine of training cruises and exercises. She took part in the German naval expedition to China in 1900 to suppress the Boxer Uprising; by the time the fleet arrived the siege of Peking had already been lifted, and Wörth saw little direct action in China. She was placed in reserve in 1906 as newer, more powerful vessels had supplanted the Brandenburg class as front-line battleships. Obsolete by the start of World War I, Wörth and Brandenburg served in a limited capacity in the Imperial German Navy as coastal defense ships for the first two years of the war; they did not see action. By 1916, Wörth was reduced to a barracks ship, a role in which she served until the end of hostilities. Despite plans to convert her into a freighter after the war, Wörth was scrapped in Danzig in 1919.

== Design ==
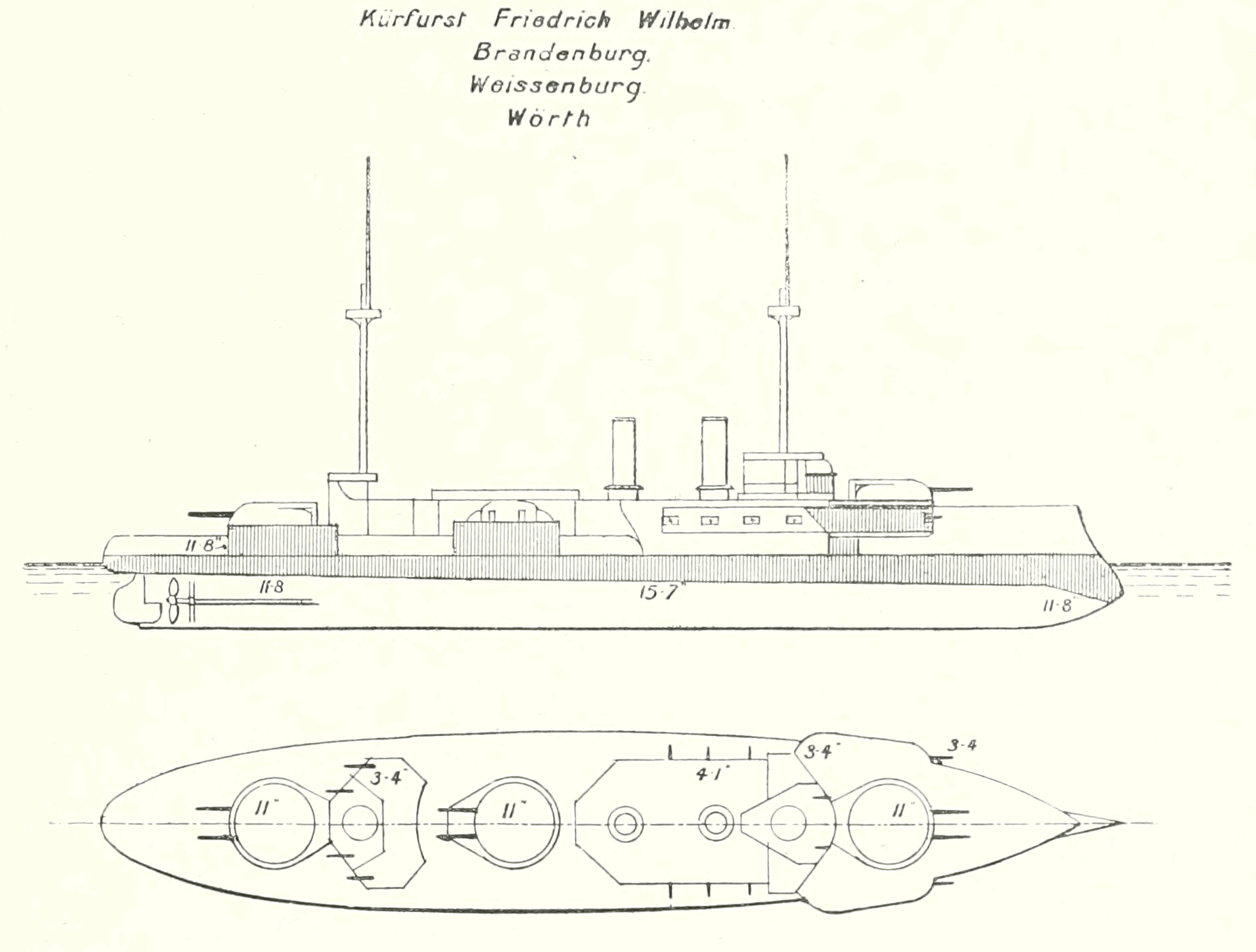
As depicted in Brassey's Naval Annual 1902

Wörth was the fourth of four Brandenburg-class battleships, the first pre-dreadnought battleships of the Kaiserliche Marine (Imperial Navy). Prior to the ascension of Kaiser Wilhelm II to the German throne in June 1888, the German fleet had been largely oriented toward defense of the German coastline and Leo von Caprivi, chief of the Reichsmarineamt (Imperial Naval Office), had ordered a number of coastal defense ships in the 1880s. In August 1888, the Kaiser, who had a strong interest in naval matters, replaced Caprivi with Vizeadmiral (VAdm—Vice Admiral) Alexander von Monts and instructed him to include four battleships in the 1889–1890 naval budget. Monts, who favored a fleet of battleships over the coastal defense strategy emphasized by his predecessor, cancelled the last four coastal defense ships authorized under Caprivi and instead ordered four 10,000-metric-ton (9,800-long-ton; 11,000-short-ton) battleships. Though they were the first modern battleships built in Germany, presaging the Tirpitz-era High Seas Fleet, the authorization for the ships came as part of a construction program that reflected the strategic and tactical confusion of the 1880s caused by the Jeune École (Young School).

Wörth was 115.7 m (379 ft 7 in) long, with a beam of 19.5 m (64 ft) and a draft of 7.6 m (24 ft 11 in). She displaced 10,013 t (9,855 long tons) as designed, and up to 10,670 t (10,500 long tons) at full combat load. She was equipped with two sets of 3-cylinder vertical triple expansion steam engines that each drove a screw propeller. Steam was provided by twelve transverse cylindrical Scotch marine boilers. The ship's propulsion system was rated at 10,000 metric horsepower (9,900 ihp) and a top speed of 16.5 knots (30.6 km/h; 19.0 mph). She had a maximum range of 4,300 nautical miles (8,000 km; 4,900 mi) at a cruising speed of 10 knots (19 km/h; 12 mph). Her crew numbered 38 officers and 530 enlisted men.

The ship was unusual for her time in that it possessed a broadside of six heavy guns in three twin gun turrets, rather than the four-gun main battery typical of contemporary battleships. The forward and after turrets carried 28 cm (11 inch) K L/40 guns, (Note: In Imperial German Navy gun nomenclature, "K" stands for Kanone (cannon), while the L/40 denotes the length of the gun. In this case, the L/40 gun is 40 caliber, meaning that the length of the gun barrel is 40 times the bore diameter.) while the amidships turret mounted a pair of 28 cm (11 inch) guns with shorter L/35 barrels. Her secondary armament consisted of eight 10.5 cm (4.1 in) SK L/35 quick-firing guns mounted in casemates and eight 8.8 cm (3.45 in) SK L/30 quick-firing guns, also casemate mounted. Wörth's armament system was rounded out with six 45 cm (17.7 in) torpedo tubes, all in above-water swivel mounts. The main battery was heavier than that of other capital ships of the period, the secondary armament was considered weak in comparison to other battleships.

The ship was protected with compound armor. Her main belt armor was 400 millimeters (15.7 in) thick in the central citadel that protected the ammunition magazines and machinery spaces. The deck was 60 mm (2.4 in) thick. The main battery barbettes were protected with 300 mm (11.8 in) thick armor.

== Service history ==
=== Construction to 1895 ===
Wörth was ordered as armored ship B, (Note: German warships were ordered under provisional names. Additions to the fleet were given a single letter; ships intended to replace older or lost vessels were ordered as "Ersatz (name of the ship to be replaced)".) and was laid down at Germaniawerft in Kiel on 3 March 1890. Initial work on the ship proceeded at the slowest pace of all four vessels in the class; her hull was not launched until 6 August 1892, more than eight months after the other three ships. Princess Viktoria, the sister of Kaiser Wilhelm II, christened the ship. Fitting-out work proceeded quickly, and she was commissioned on 31 October 1893, the first ship of the class to enter active duty. Extensive sea trials followed her commissioning and lasted until April 1894. During her trials, she was briefly assigned to the maneuver squadron of the Heimatflotte (Home Fleet) to replace her sister Brandenburg, which was damaged by a boiler pipe explosion. On 1 August 1894, Wörth was assigned as the flagship of the German fleet for the annual autumn maneuvers, under the command of Admiral Max von der Goltz. Goltz came aboard the new battleship on 19 August with his staff, which included then-Kapitän zur See (Captain at Sea) Alfred von Tirpitz. Toward the end of the maneuvers, which took place in both the North and Baltic Seas, Kaiser Wilhelm II came aboard Wörth and reviewed a fleet parade on 21 September.

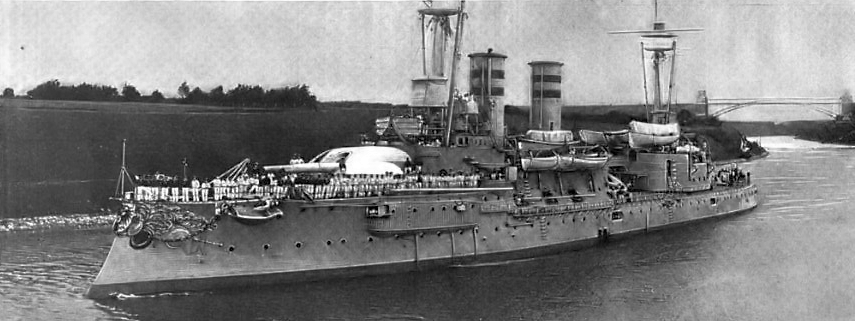
Wörth in the Kiel Canal before 1901

During this period, Wörth was commanded by Prince Heinrich, the younger brother of Wilhelm II; the senior watch officer aboard the ship in 1894 was Franz von Hipper, who went on to command the German battlecruiser squadron during World War I and later the entire High Seas Fleet. On 1 November, Czar Alexander III of Russia died; Wilhelm II initially planned to send his brother to St. Petersburg to represent Germany at the funeral aboard his flagship. But General Bernhard Franz Wilhelm von Werder suggested that sending a warship named for the Battle of Wörth of the still-recent Franco-Prussian War of 1870–1871 would antagonize the French delegation and would be unwise, given the recently signed Franco-Russian Alliance. Wilhelm II agreed, and so Prince Heinrich traveled to the funeral by train. After her sister Kurfürst Friedrich Wilhelm entered service, she replaced Wörth as the fleet flagship. Wörth was thereafter assigned to I Division of I Squadron, in turn replacing the old ironclad Deutschland.

Wörth and the rest of the squadron attended ceremonies for the Kaiser Wilhelm Canal at Kiel on 3 December 1894. The squadron subsequently began a winter training cruise in the Baltic Sea; this was the first such cruise by the German fleet. In previous years, the bulk of the fleet was deactivated for the winter months. I Division anchored in Stockholm from 7 to 11 December, during the 300th anniversary of the birth of Swedish king Gustavus Adolphus. Further exercises were conducted in the Baltic before the ships had to put into their home ports for repairs. From 19 December to 27 March 1895, Wörth returned to her old duty as fleet flagship while Kurfürst Friedrich Wilhelm was in dock for repairs. The ship was occupied with individual and divisional training in early 1895. In May, more fleet maneuvers were carried out in the western Baltic, concluding with a visit by the fleet to Kirkwall in Orkney. The squadron returned to Kiel in early June, where preparations were underway for the opening of the Kaiser Wilhelm Canal. Tactical exercises were carried out in Kiel Bay in the presence of foreign delegations to the opening ceremony.

On 1 July, the German fleet began a major cruise into the Atlantic; on the return voyage in early August, the fleet stopped at the Isle of Wight for the Cowes Regatta. While there on 6 August, Wilhelm II held a remembrance ceremony for the 25th anniversary of Wörth's namesake battle. This was sharply criticized in the British press. The fleet returned to Wilhelmshaven on 10 August and began preparations for the autumn maneuvers that would begin later that month. The first exercises began in the Helgoland Bight on 25 August. The fleet then steamed through the Skagerrak to the Baltic; heavy storms caused significant damage to many of the ships and the torpedo boat S 41 capsized and sank in the storms—only three men were saved. The fleet stayed briefly in Kiel before resuming maneuvers, including live-fire exercises, in the Kattegat and the Great Belt. The main maneuvers began on 7 September with a mock attack from Kiel toward the eastern Baltic. Subsequent maneuvers took place off the coast of Pomerania and in Danzig Bay. A fleet review for Wilhelm II off Jershöft concluded the maneuvers on 14 September.

=== 1896–1900 ===
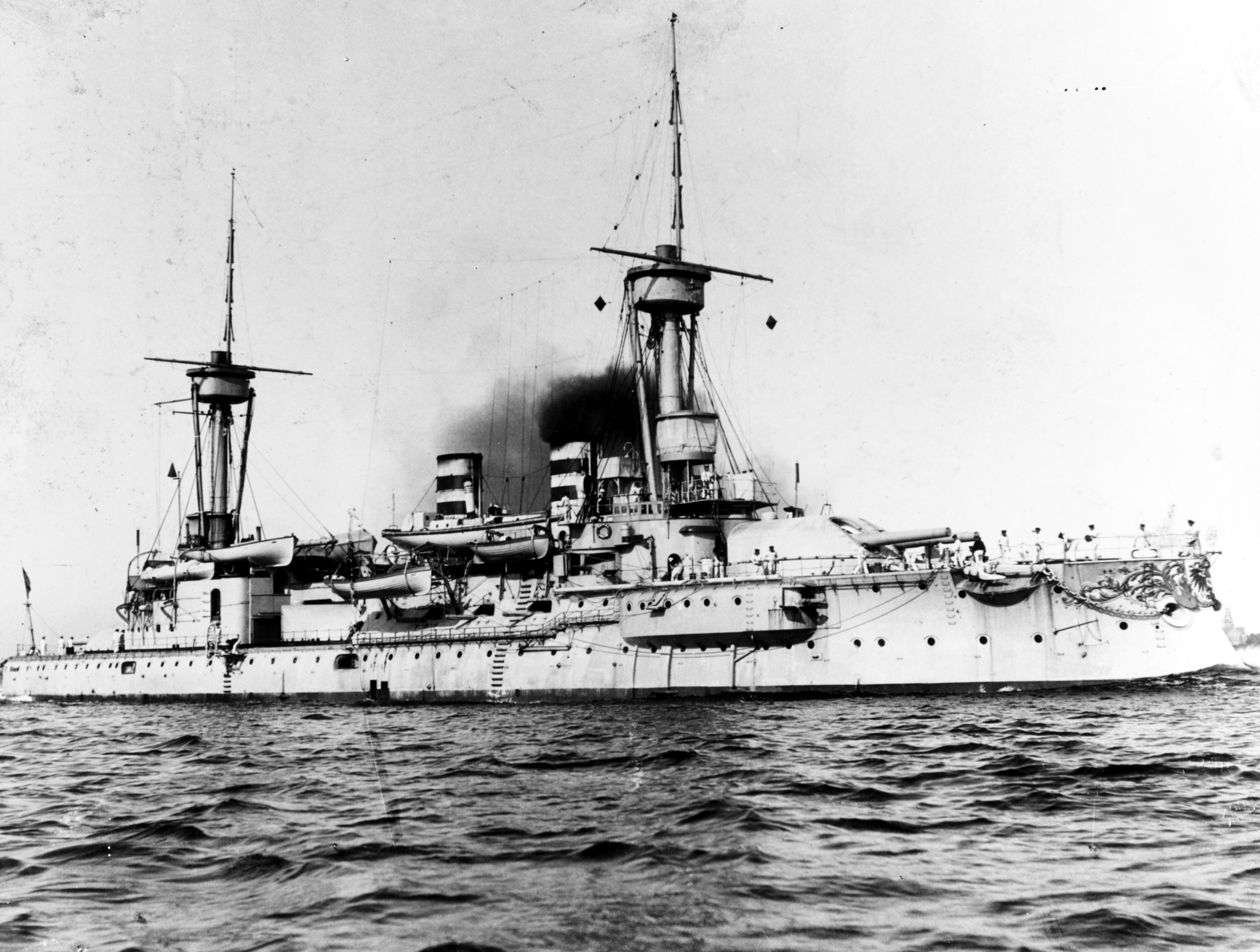
SMS Wörth in 1899

The year 1896 followed much the same pattern as the previous year. Individual ship training was conducted through April, followed by squadron training in the North Sea in late April and early May. This included a visit to the Dutch ports of Vlissingen and Nieuwediep. Additional maneuvers, which lasted from the end of May to the end of July, took the squadron further north in the North Sea, frequently into Norwegian waters. The ships visited Bergen from 11 to 18 May. During the maneuvers, Wilhelm II and the Chinese viceroy Li Hongzhang observed a fleet review off Kiel. On 9 August, the training fleet assembled in Wilhelmshaven for the annual autumn fleet training. The following month, Czar Nicholas II of Russia visited the fleet in Kiel, boarding Wörth on 8 September. The ship won the Kaiser's Schießpreis (Shooting Prize) for excellent gunnery in I Squadron during 1896.

Wörth and the rest of the fleet operated under the normal routine of individual and unit training in the first half of 1897. The ship represented Germany during the Fleet Review for Queen Victoria's Diamond Jubilee in June 1897. The typical routine was interrupted in early August when Wilhelm II and Augusta went to visit the Russian imperial court at Kronstadt; both divisions of I Squadron were sent to accompany the Kaiser. They returned to Neufahrwasser in Danzig on 15 August, where the rest of the fleet joined them for the annual autumn maneuvers. The maneuvers were completed by 22 September in Wilhelmshaven. In early December, I Division conducted maneuvers in the Kattegat and the Skagerrak, but they were cut short due to shortages in officers and men.

The fleet followed the normal routine of individual and fleet training in 1898 without incident. A voyage to the British Isles was also included. The fleet stopped in Queenstown, Greenock, and Kirkwall. The fleet assembled in Kiel on 14 August for the annual autumn exercises. The maneuvers included a mock blockade of the coast of Mecklenburg and a pitched battle with an "Eastern Fleet" in the Danzig Bay. While steaming back to Kiel, a severe storm hit the fleet, causing significant damage to many ships and sinking the torpedo boat S 58. The fleet then transited the Kaiser Wilhelm Canal and continued maneuvers in the North Sea. Training finished on 17 September in Wilhelmshaven. In December, I Division conducted artillery and torpedo training in Eckernförde Bay, followed by divisional training in the Kattegat and Skagerrak. During these maneuvers, the division visited Kungsbacka, Sweden, from 9 to 13 December. After returning to Kiel, the ships of I Division went into dock for their winter repairs.

On 25 November 1899, Wörth was conducting gunnery training in Eckernförde Bay when she struck a rock. It tore a 22 ft (6.7 m) wide hole in the hull, flooding three of her watertight compartments. The ship was sent to Wilhelmshaven for repair work. Before repairs could be begun, about 500 t (490 long tons) of coal had to be unloaded to lighten the ship. Temporary steel plates were riveted to cover the hole on the starboard side, while the hull plates on the port side had to be re-riveted. The work lasted from December 1899 until February 1900; she was therefore unavailable for the normal winter cruise of I Squadron.

=== Boxer Uprising ===
Wörth at anchor, date unknown

During the Boxer Uprising in 1900, Chinese nationalists laid siege to the foreign embassies in Beijing and murdered Baron Clemens von Ketteler, the German minister. The widespread violence against Westerners in China led to an alliance between Germany and seven other Great Powers: the United Kingdom, Italy, Russia, Austria-Hungary, the United States, France, and Japan. Those soldiers who were in China at the time were too few in number to defeat the Boxers; in Beijing there was a force of slightly more than 400 officers and infantry from the armies of the eight European powers. At the time, the primary German military force in China was the East Asia Squadron, which consisted of the protected cruisers Kaiserin Augusta, Hansa, and Hertha, the small cruisers Irene and Gefion, and the gunboats Jaguar and Iltis. There was also a German 500-man detachment in Taku; combined with the other nations' units the force numbered some 2,100 men. Led by the British Admiral Edward Seymour, these men attempted to reach Beijing but were forced to stop in Tientsin due to heavy resistance. As a result, the Kaiser determined an expeditionary force would be sent to China to reinforce the East Asia Squadron. The expedition would include Wörth and her three sisters, six cruisers, ten freighters, three torpedo boats, and six regiments of marines, under the command of Generalfeldmarschall (General Field Marshal) Alfred von Waldersee.

On 7 July, Konteradmiral (KAdm—Rear Admiral) Richard von Geißler, the expeditionary force commander, reported that his ships were ready for the operation, and they left two days later. The four battleships and the aviso Hela transited the Kaiser Wilhelm Canal and stopped in Wilhelmshaven to rendezvous with the rest of the expeditionary force. On 11 July, the force steamed out of the Jade Bight, bound for China. They stopped to coal at Gibraltar on 17–18 July and passed through the Suez Canal on 26–27 July. More coal was taken on at Perim in the Red Sea, and on 2 August the fleet entered the Indian Ocean. On 10 August, the ships reached Colombo, Ceylon, and on 14 August they passed through the Strait of Malacca. They arrived in Singapore on 18 August and departed five days later, reaching Hong Kong on 28 August. Two days later, the expeditionary force stopped in the outer roadstead at Wusong, downriver from Shanghai. From there, Wörth was detached to cover the disembarkation of the German expeditionary corps outside the Taku Forts.

By the time the German fleet had arrived, the siege of Beijing had already been lifted by forces from other members of the Eight-Nation Alliance that had formed to deal with the Boxers. Wörth left Taku to coal at Qingdao, the German naval base in China, and on 25 October returned to Wusong via Yantai. There, she joined the blockade of the Yangtze River. Since the situation had calmed, the four battleships were sent to Hong Kong or Nagasaki, Japan, in late 1900 and early 1901 for overhauls; Wörth went to Nagasaki from 30 November to the end of December. She returned to Wusong on 27 December, where she remained until 18 February 1901, when she moved to Tsingtau for division exercises and gunnery drills. Wörth and the rest of the fleet then stayed in Shanghai in April and May.

On 26 May, the German high command recalled the expeditionary force to Germany. The fleet took on supplies in Shanghai and departed Chinese waters on 1 June. The ships stopped in Singapore from 10 to 15 June and took on coal before proceeding to Colombo, where they stayed from 22 to 26 June. Steaming against the monsoons forced the fleet to stop in Mahé, Seychelles, to take on more coal. The ships then stopped for a day each to take on coal in Aden and Port Said. On 1 August they reached Cádiz, and then met with I Division and steamed back to Germany together. They separated after reaching Helgoland, and on 11 August, after reaching the Jade roadstead, the ships of the expeditionary force were visited by Koester, who was now the Inspector General of the Navy. The following day the expeditionary fleet was dissolved. In the end, the operation cost the German government more than 100 million marks.

=== 1901–1914 ===
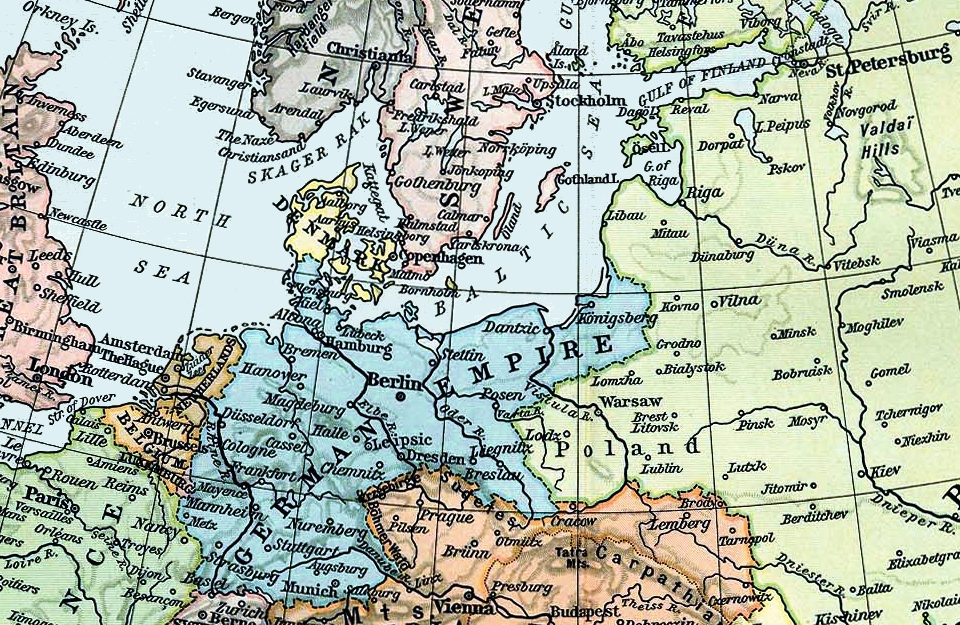
Map of the North and Baltic Seas in 1911

Following her return from China, Wörth was taken into the drydocks at the Kaiserliche Werft (Imperial Dockyard) in Wilhelmshaven for an overhaul that lasted from 14 to 17 August. She then joined the fleet for autumn maneuvers. In the meantime, Wörth and her sisters, which had been assigned to I Division before their expedition to China, had been transferred to II Division of I Squadron following their return. On 24 November, Wörth was decommissioned for a major reconstruction at the Kaiserliche Werft in Wilhelmshaven; she was the first member of her class to be modernized. During the modernization, a second conning tower was added in the aft superstructure, along with a gangway. Wörth and the other ships had their boilers replaced with newer models, and also had their superstructure amidships reduced. The work lasted until December 1903.

After her modernization, Wörth returned to service on 27 September 1904 assigned to II Squadron, where she replaced the old coastal defense ship Beowulf. She served briefly as the flagship of KAdm Alfred Breusing from September until December, when she was replaced in that role by Braunschweig. On 16 February 1905, Wörth ran aground in the Kieler Förde. She was pulled free two days later after enough coal and ammunition were thrown overboard to lighten the ship. She then steamed into Kiel and entered drydock, where her bottom was found to be slightly dented. A second accident occurred on 5 July, when the torpedo boat S 124 ran across Wörth's bow. The battleship could not turn in time and rammed the torpedo boat, damaging it severely. One of S 124's boiler rooms flooded and the rush of steam from the boilers badly burned three men.

On 4 July 1906, Wörth was transferred to the Reserve Formation of the North Sea. She initially served as the flagship of the unit, but on 1 October she was replaced by Kurfürst Friedrich Wilhelm. She was then decommissioned and her crew reduced to only a maintenance staff. Over the next eight years, she was reactivated only twice, from 2 August to 13 September in 1910 and from 31 July to 15 September the following year; both periods were during the annual autumn maneuvers. She served with III Squadron in both exercises, and was the flagship of the second command admiral for the squadron, KAdm Heinrich Sass. She returned to reserve status on 15 September, and a month later was docked in the Kaiserliche Werft in Kiel to maintain her for future service.

=== World War I ===
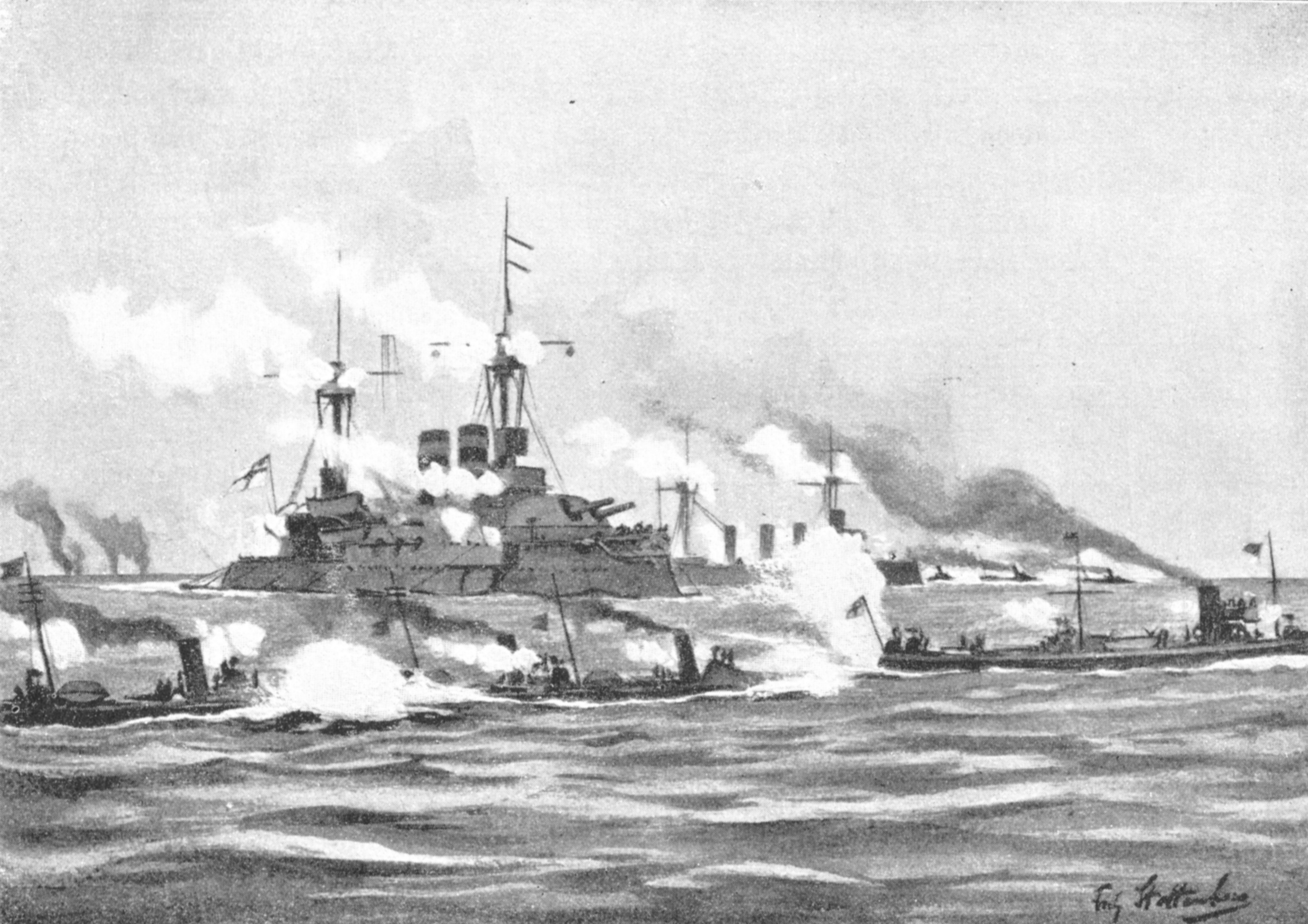
Illustration of a Brandenburg-class battleship with torpedo boats in the foreground

On 5 September 1914, shortly after the outbreak of World War I, Wörth was assigned to V Battle Squadron under the command of VAdm Max von Grapow. The squadron was initially used for coastal defense in the North Sea. From 19 to 26 September, Wörth and the rest of V Squadron went on a sortie into the eastern Baltic but encountered no Russian forces. The ships subsequently returned to the North Sea and resumed their guard duties. Wörth was briefly transferred to VI Battle Squadron from 16 January to 25 February 1915 to strengthen the defenses of the Jade Bight and the mouth of the Weser. On 5 March, she was moved to Kiel, where her crew was reduced. After a short period of rest, her crew was restored and she and Brandenburg were transferred to Libau. She served as the flagship of KAdm Alfred Begas, the new commander of V Squadron. In Libau, they were assigned as guard ships in the recently conquered Russian harbor.

The two old battleships were initially moored outside the harbor while it was cleared of wrecks. During this period, the ships prepared for an expected attack by the new Russian Gangut-class battleships, but the assault did not materialize. On 12 July, the crews of both ships were reduced again. On 15 January 1916, V Squadron was disbanded and Begas removed his flag from Wörth. She left Libau on 7 March and arrived in Neufahrwasser the following day. On 10 March she was decommissioned in Danzig to free her crew and guns for other uses. Some of her main battery guns were converted into "Kurfürst" railroad guns; they were ready for service by early 1918. Wörth herself was employed as a barracks ship in Danzig until the end of the war in November 1918. Both Wörth and Brandenburg were struck from the naval register on 13 May 1919 and sold for scrapping. The two ships were purchased by Norddeutsche Tiefbaugesellschaft; Wörth was initially to be rebuilt into a freighter, but the planned reconstruction did not eventuate. Instead, Wörth was broken up for scrap in Danzig.
