= Nieuwediep =

Nieuwediep may refer to:

- Nieuwediep, Netherlands, village in Drenthe, Netherlands
- Nieuwediep (river), canal near Den Helder, North Holland
