= 28 cm K L/40 "Kurfürst" =

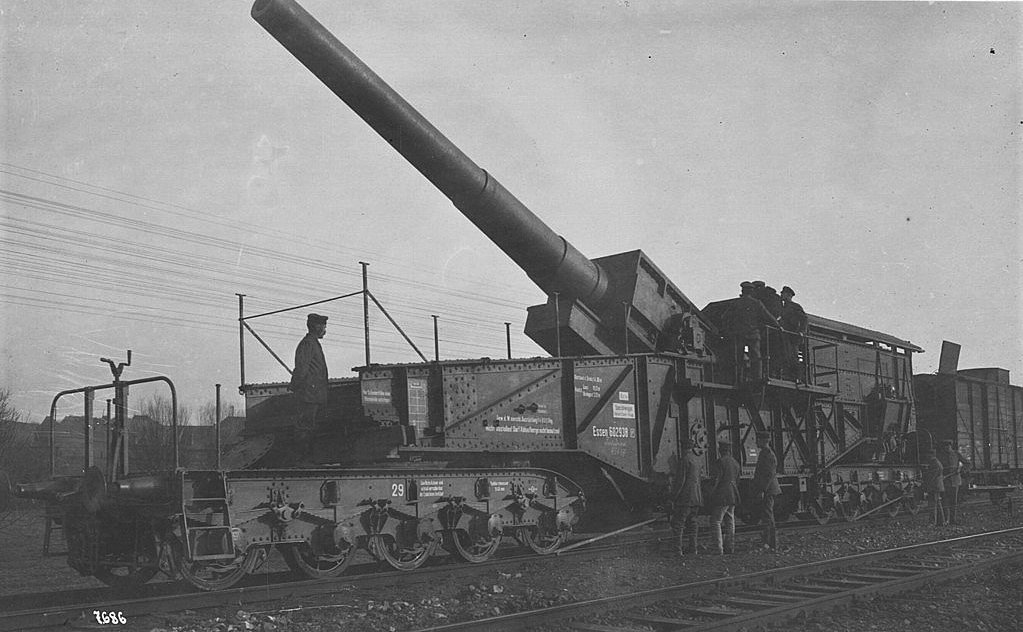
- Type: Railroad gun
- Place of origin: German Empire

Service history
- In service: 1918
- Used by: German Empire
- Wars: World War I

Production history
- Designer: Krupp
- Designed: 1917
- Manufacturer: Krupp
- Produced: 1917—18
- No. built: 6

Specifications
- Mass: 149 tonnes (147 long tons; 164 short tons)
- Length: 21.61 metres (70 ft 11 in)
- Barrel length: about 10.401 metres (34 ft 1 in) L/40
- Shell: separate-loading, bagged charge and projectile
- Caliber: 283 mm (11.1 in)
- Breech: cylindro-prismatic horizontal sliding-wedge
- Recoil: hydro-pneumatic
- Carriage: 2 x 5-axle trucks
- Elevation: +0° to 45°
- Traverse: 4° (E. u. B.); 180° on platform
- Muzzle velocity: 690–715 m/s (2,260–2,350 ft/s)
- Maximum firing range: 18,100–25,900 m (19,800–28,300 yd)

The 28 cm K L/40 "Kurfürst" (K - Kanone (Cannon) L - Länge (with a 40 caliber barrel), Kurfürst (Elector) was a German railroad gun that served on the Western Front in 1918 during World War I. Originally a naval gun, it was adapted for land service when its original ships began to be disarmed beginning in 1915. All six built were destroyed postwar according to the terms of the Treaty of Versailles.

== Design ==
The 28 cm MRK L/40 was a built-up gun made from three layers of reinforcing hoops. It used a cylindro-prismatic horizontal sliding breech, but unlike later Krupp guns it did not use a metallic cartridge case. Projectiles and bagged charges were loaded separately. These guns comprised the primary armament of the Brandenburg-class pre-dreadnoughts SMS Brandenburg and SMS Wörth, but they were transferred to the Army from the Navy (Kaiserliche Marine) when those ships began to be relegated to training duties in 1915. Six guns were mounted on the Eisenbahn und Bettungsschiessgerüst (E. u. B.) (railroad and firing platform) mounts successfully used by other German railroad guns. Unlike every other large German railroad gun, it used a massive rectangular cradle for its gun.

The E. u. B. could fire from any suitable section of track after curved wedges were bolted to the track behind each wheel to absorb any residual recoil after the gun cradle recoiled backwards. It also had a pintle built into the underside of the front of the mount. Two large rollers were fitted to the underside of the mount at the rear. Seven cars could carry a portable metal firing platform (Bettungslafette) that had a central pivot mount and an outer rail. It was assembled with the aid of a derrick or crane, which took between three and five days, and railroad tracks were laid slightly past the firing platform to accommodate the front bogies of the gun. The gun was moved over the firing platform and then lowered into position after the central section of rail was removed. After the gun's pintle was bolted to the firing platform's pivot mount, the entire carriage was jacked up so that the trucks and their sections of rail could be removed. The carriage was then lowered so that the rear rollers rested on the outer track. Concrete versions were also used. It could have up to 360° of traverse. The E. u. B. retained 4° of on-mount traverse for fine aiming adjustments.

=== Ammunition ===
Ammunition was moved by means of an overhead rail from which a shell trolley carried individual shells to be placed in the loading tray fixed to the breech. An extensible rail could raised and braced in place to allow the shell trolley to reach shells placed on the ground or in an ammunition car behind the mount. This ammunition car sometimes had its own overhead rail to move the shells forward to where the trolley in the mount could reach it through a hatch in the roof. The shell and powder were manually rammed into the gun. The gun had to be loaded at zero elevation and thus needed to be re-aimed between each shot.

Shell name	Weight	Filling Weight	Muzzle velocity	Range
base-fused high-explosive shell (Sprenggranate L/2.9 m. Bdz.)	240 kg (530 lb)	15.9 kg (35 lb) (HE)	715 m/s (2,350 ft/s)	18.1 km (19,800 yd)
nose- and base-fused HE shell with ballistic cap (Sprenggranate L/4.4 m. Bdz. u. Kz. (mit Haube))	284 kg (626 lb)	24 kg (53 lb) (TNT)	690 m/s (2,300 ft/s)	25.9 km (28,300 yd)

== Combat History ==
The six "Kurfürst" guns entered service in early 1918, participating in the German spring offensive and the subsequent defensive operations. They were organized into Batteries 393, 434, 722 and the First through Third Batteries of Bavarian Foot Artillery Battalion (1.-3./Bayerische Fußartillerie-Bataillon) 29 with one gun each. All six were destroyed in 1921–22 by the Military Inter-Allied Commission of Control.
