= 28 cm MRK L/40 =

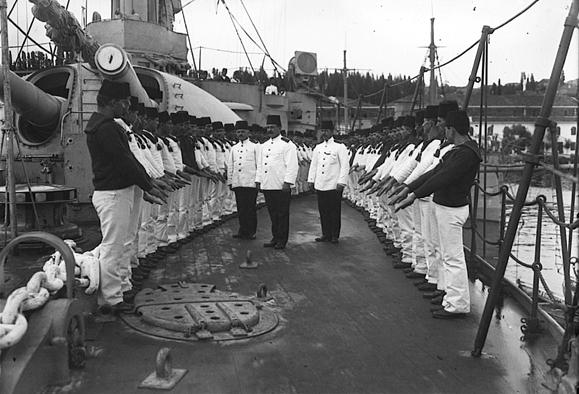
- The Ottoman battleship Barbaros Hayreddin or Turgut Reis
- Type: Naval gun Railway gun Coastal artillery
- Place of origin: German Empire

Service history
- Used by: German Empire; Ottoman Empire; Chile; China
- Wars: Boxer Rebellion; World War I

Production history
- Designer: Krupp
- Manufacturer: Krupp

Specifications
- Mass: 44 t (43 long tons; 49 short tons)
- Length: 11.2 m (36 ft 9 in) L/40
- Barrel length: 10.4 m (34 ft 1 in)
- Shell: Separate-loading, bagged charge and projectile
- Shell weight: 240 kg (530 lb)
- Caliber: 283 mm (11.1 in)
- Breech: Horizontal sliding-wedge
- Elevation: -5° to +25°
- Traverse: -150° to +150°
- Rate of fire: 1 round every two minutes
- Muzzle velocity: 715 m/s (2,350 ft/s)
- Effective firing range: 11 km (6.8 mi) at 25°
- Maximum firing range: 15 km (9.3 mi) at 25°

The 28 cm MRK L/40 was a German naval gun that was used in World War I as the primary armament of the Brandenburg-class pre-dreadnought battleships. Some were also converted to railway guns during World War I.

== Design ==
The 28 cm MRK L/40 gun was a built-up gun made from three layers of reinforcing hoops. It used a cylindro-prismatic horizontal sliding breech, but unlike later Krupp guns it did not use a metallic cartridge case. Instead, it used separate loading bagged charges and projectiles.

The four ships of the Brandenburg class had a slightly unusual arrangement for their primary armament. Although the primary armament consisted of six 28 cm guns in three twin gun turrets that all fired the same ammunition, the fore and aft turrets had 28 cm MRK L/40 guns, while the amidships turret had 28 cm MRK L/35 guns due to space constraints. The ships did not have centralized fire control and each gun type had different ballistics. The L/35 guns had a muzzle velocity of 685 m/s (2,250 ft/s) and a maximum range of 14.45 km (8.98 mi) vs 715 m/s (2,350 ft/s) and a maximum range of 15 km (9.3 mi) for the L/40 guns.

== Railway artillery ==
When the two Brandenburg-class ships still in German service SMS Brandenburg and SMS Wörth were relegated to training duties in 1915 six of the L/40 guns were transferred to the Army where they were known as 28 cm K L/40 "Kurfürst" guns. These were installed on Eisenbahn und Bettungsschiessgerüst (E. u. B.) (railroad and firing platform) mounts successfully used by other German railroad guns. Unlike every other large German railroad gun, it used a massive rectangular cradle for its gun.

The six "Kurfürst" guns entered service in early 1918, participating in the German spring offensive and the subsequent defensive operations. They were organized into Batteries 393, 434, 722 and the First through Third Batteries of Bavarian Foot Artillery Battalion (1.-3./Bayerische Fußartillerie-Bataillon) 29 with one gun each. All six were destroyed in 1921–22 by the Military Inter-Allied Commission of Control.

== Coastal artillery ==
The 28 cm L/40 was also used by Chile who operated four guns at Fuerte Vergara, Valdivia and Yerbas Buenas until 1956. China also bought two 28 cm L/40 guns to arm Fort Hulishan, Xiamen, China.

== Ammunition ==
Before and during World War I, the gun used about 56.6 kg (125 lb) of RP C/12 (Rohr-Pulver – tube powder) propellant that was a mix of nitrocellulose, nitroglycerin and small amounts of other additives with a calorific value of 950 and an uncooled explosion temperature of 2,975 kelvins.

Shell name	Weight	Filling Weight	Armor Penetration
Armor-piercing shell (Panzergrenate L/2.6)	240 kg (530 lb)	unknown	160 mm (6.3 in) at 13.12 km (8.15 mi).
High-explosive shell (Sprenggranate L/2.9)	240 kg (530 lb)	15.9 kg (35 lb) HE	unknown

== Photo gallery ==
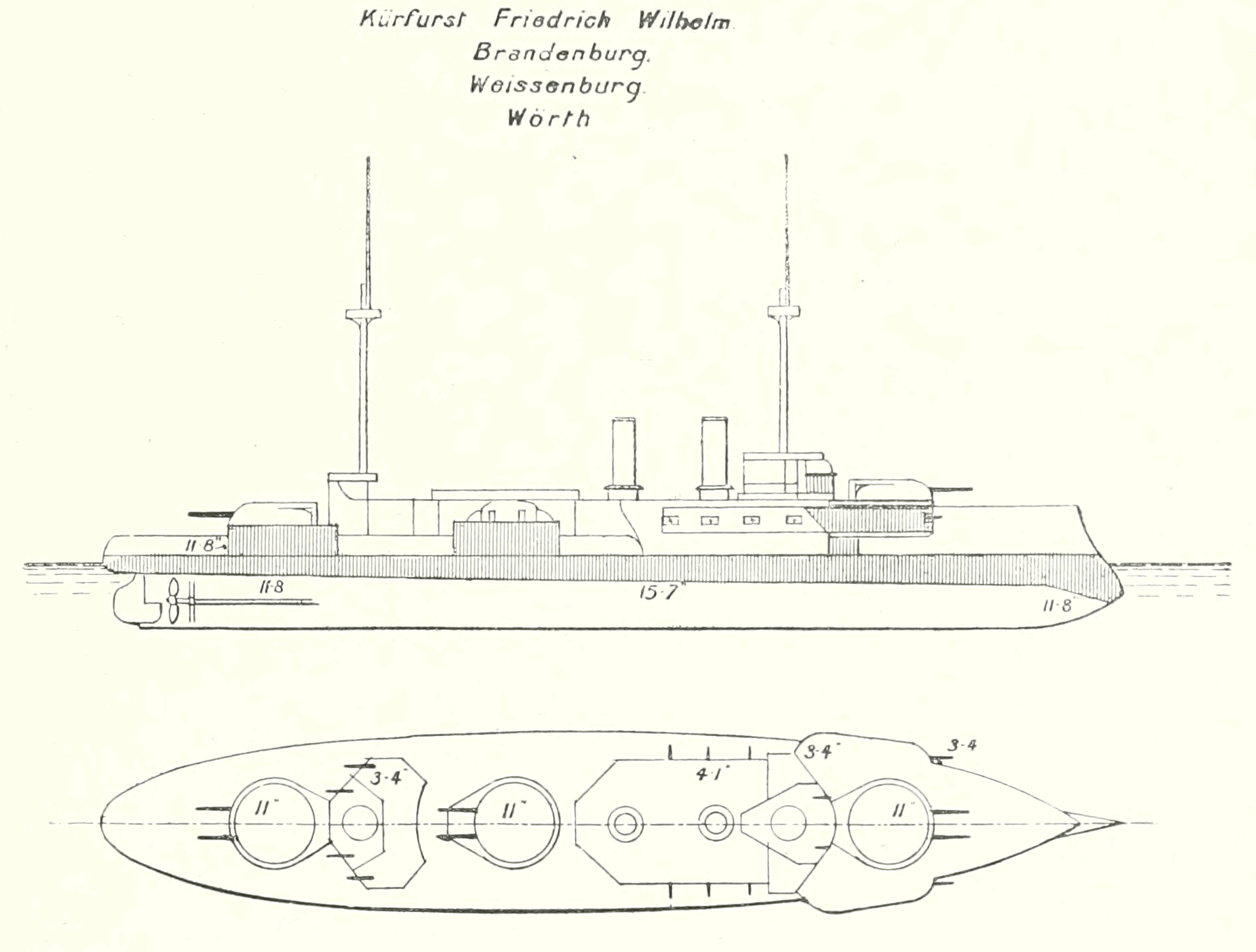
The Brandenburg class as depicted in Brassey's Naval Annual 1902

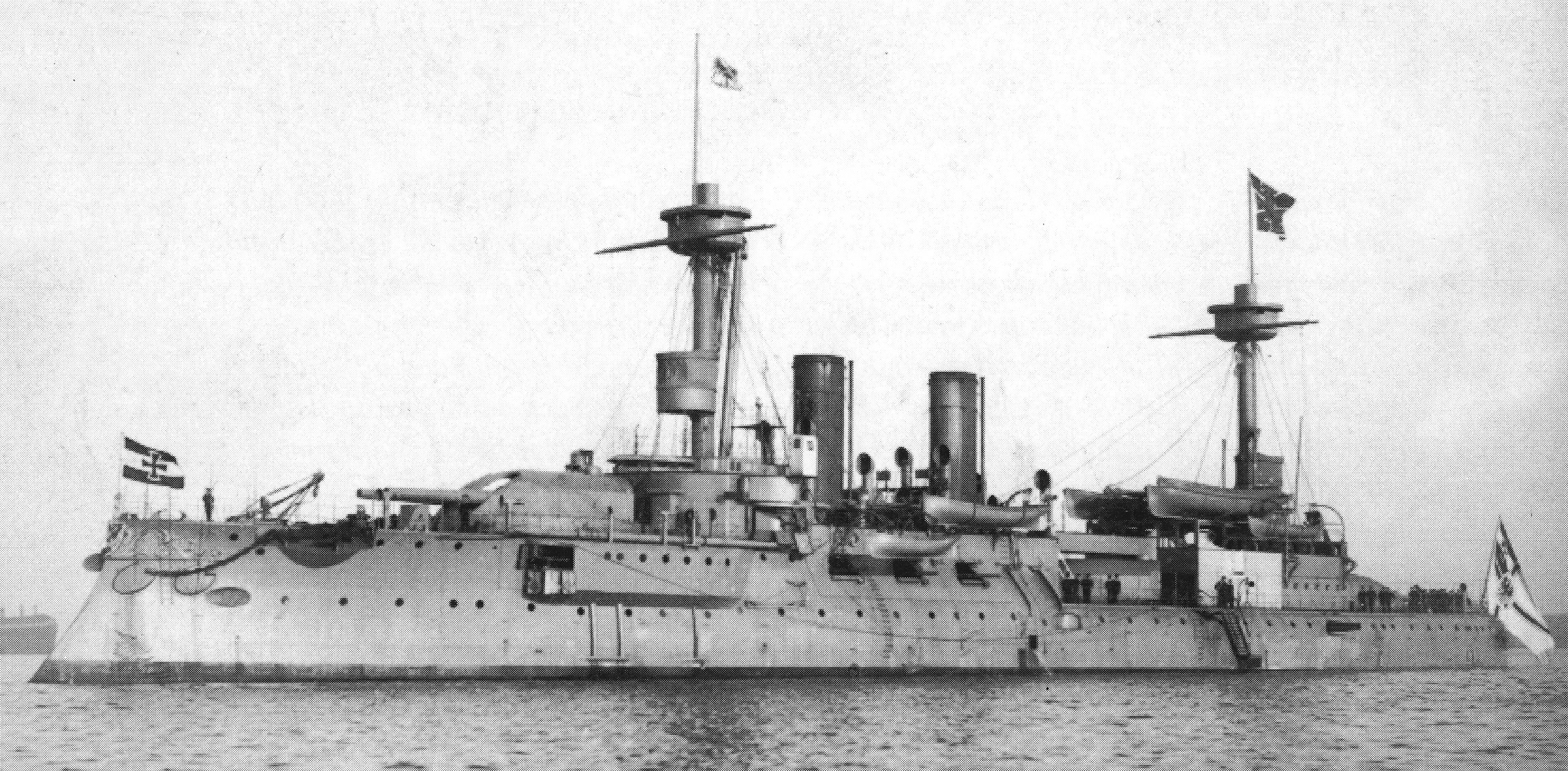
SMS Brandenburg

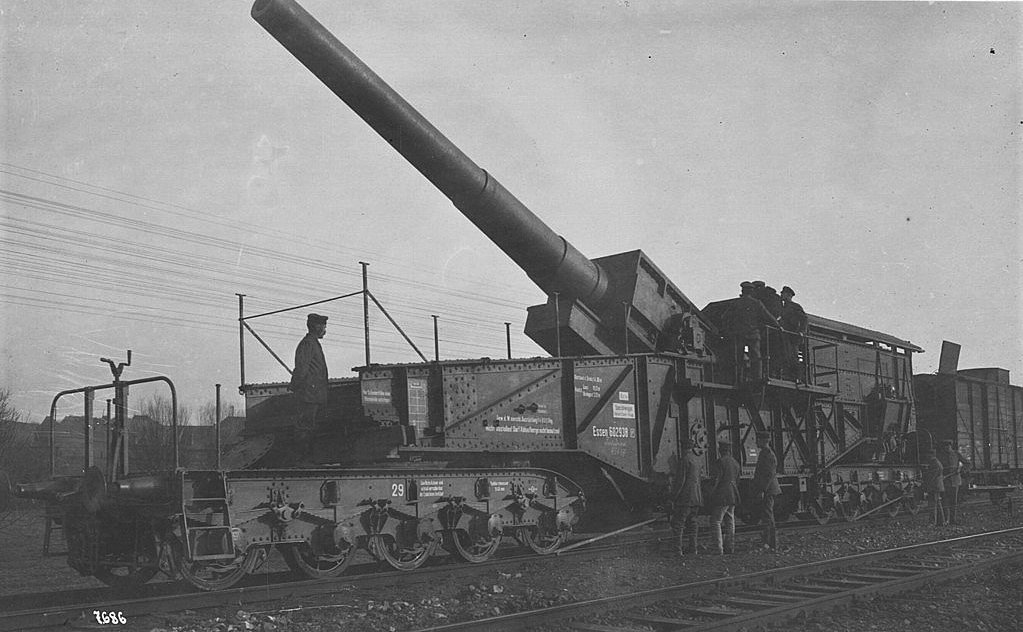
A converted railroad gun

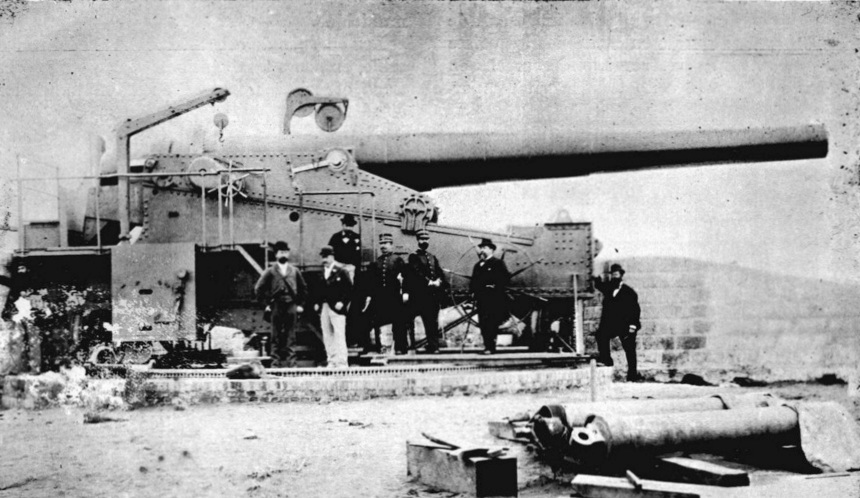
One of two guns at Fuerte Vergara.

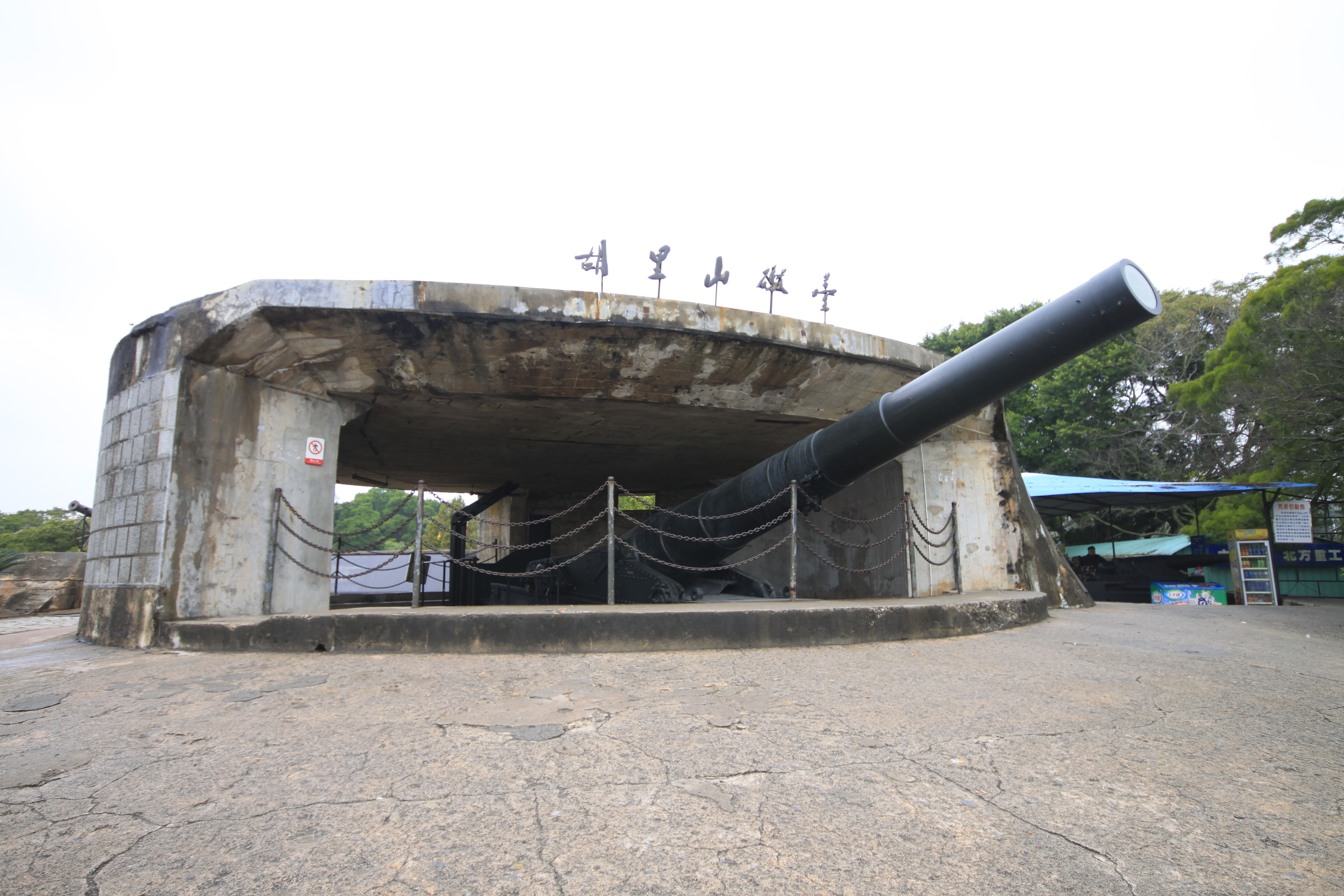
One of the two guns of Fort Hulishan.

== Bibliography ==
- François, Guy. Eisenbahnartillerie: Histoire de l'artillerie lourd sur voie ferrée allemande des origines à 1945. Paris: Editions Histoire et Fortifications, 2006
- pgonzalezp.pdf
