= August von Thomsen =

- Born: August Thomsen; August 6, 1846; Oldenswort, Germany
- Died: September 26, 1920 (aged 74); Kiel, Germany
- Military career
- Allegiance: German Confederation; North German Confederation; German Empire
- Branch: Reichsflotte; North German Federal Navy; Imperial German Navy
- Service years: 1862-1903
- Rank: Admiral
- Commands: SMS König Wilhelm; SMS Gneisenau; Chef der Marinestation der Ostsee; Chef des I. Geschwaders; Chef der Marinestation der Nordsee

August von Thomsen (6 August 1846 – 26 September 1920) was an Admiral of the German Imperial Navy. He was the son of Adolf Theodor Thomsen (a Prussian politician) and Catharina Tönnies. In 1898 - 1903 he was senior admiral (commander) at the North Sea Naval Station (Marinestation der Nordsee) at Wilhelmshaven.

His fame as "the father of German naval artillery" dates from 1885 when he was appointed chief gunner. He set up the first long range experiments on the ironclad SMS Bayern in October 1885.

In September 1894 he took part in the fall maneuvers of the fleet as commander of the Third Squadron with the sail frigates Stein (flagship), Moltke, Stosch, and Gneisenau.

In the late 1890s, at a temperance meeting in Kiel, he stated that, "Alcohol is the great foe of our country."

On his flagship SMS Stein on 4 September 1894 as Rear Admiral and chief of the Second Squadron, he took part in a Fleet Review before the Kaiser at Swinemünde.

In 1899 he was involved in contingency planning for a war against the United States. He objected to the original plan of sailing directly to attack New York City, suggesting instead an attack on Puerto Rico which would pull the American ships away from their Atlantic coastal bases.

As a member of the Kaiserlicher Yacht Club he met with representatives of the Eastern Yacht Club of Boston in September 1905 to arrange for the establishment of an American-German Challenge Cup.

As commander of the Marinestation der Nordsee, he oversaw the building (1905–08) of a heavy gun fortress installation at Cuxhaven at the mouth of the Elbe River to protect the Elbe estuary, Hamburg and the North-Baltic Sea Canal (Kiel Canal) from enemy raids from the North Sea. Kaiser Wilhelm II named the fortress in his honor (Fort Thomsen). It is today a residential area of Cuxhaven.

Grand Admiral Prince Heinrich of Prussia called him the "Reformer of sea Warfare Management. He was also known as "the father of German naval artillery." He had the future Admiral Franz von Hipper as navigator aboard his flagship the battleship Kurfürst Friedrich Wilhelm.

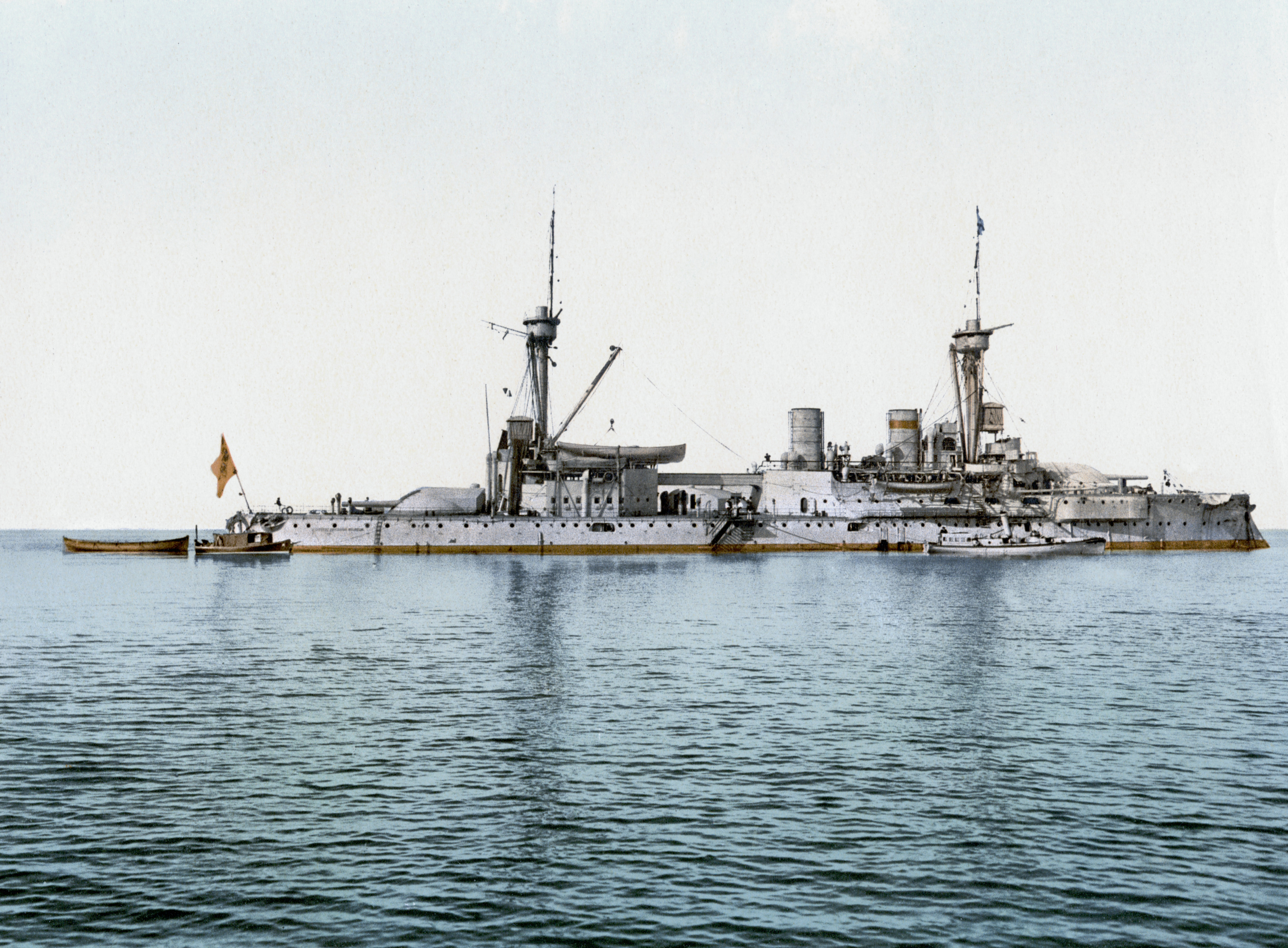
SMS Kurfürst Friedrich Wilhelm 1900

In 1900, he objected, along with his counterpart Hans von Koester, commander of the Second Division (Baltic Sea Naval Station) in Kiel, to the poor preparation and staffing of the German Imperial Admiralty Staff under Otto von Diederichs. Again like Koester, he opposed the use of resources as Diederichs proposed for a major increase in the size of the Admiralty Staff, the creation of a separate intelligence section, and, especially, the removal of the Naval War College (Marineacademie) to Berlin.

He supported the activities of the German Navy League (Flottenverein) to build public support for building and paying for a large navy, and was its second-vice president in 1906.

During World War I he came to oppose the "soft" policy of Chancellor Theobald von Bethmann Hollweg toward Britain and came to support a resumption of unrestricted submarine warfare against Britain. On 30 July 1916 he spoke along these lines at a meeting in Munich.

He was honored in 1916 by being raised to the Prussian nobility (knighted), and in 1918 an auxiliary patrol ship (215 ton Trawler FV) built by Unterweser in Bremerhaven was named Admiral von Thomsen in his honor.

August von Thomsen spent his last years in Kiel in his house 'Villa Barbara', named after Saint Barbara, the patroness of artillerymen. He died there 26 September 1920, having seen his beloved fleet destroyed at Scapa Flow.

== Works ==
- Die deutsche Flotte: eine Plauderei, etc. by August von Thomsen (Unknown Binding - 1917)
