= Hans von Koester =

German naval officer

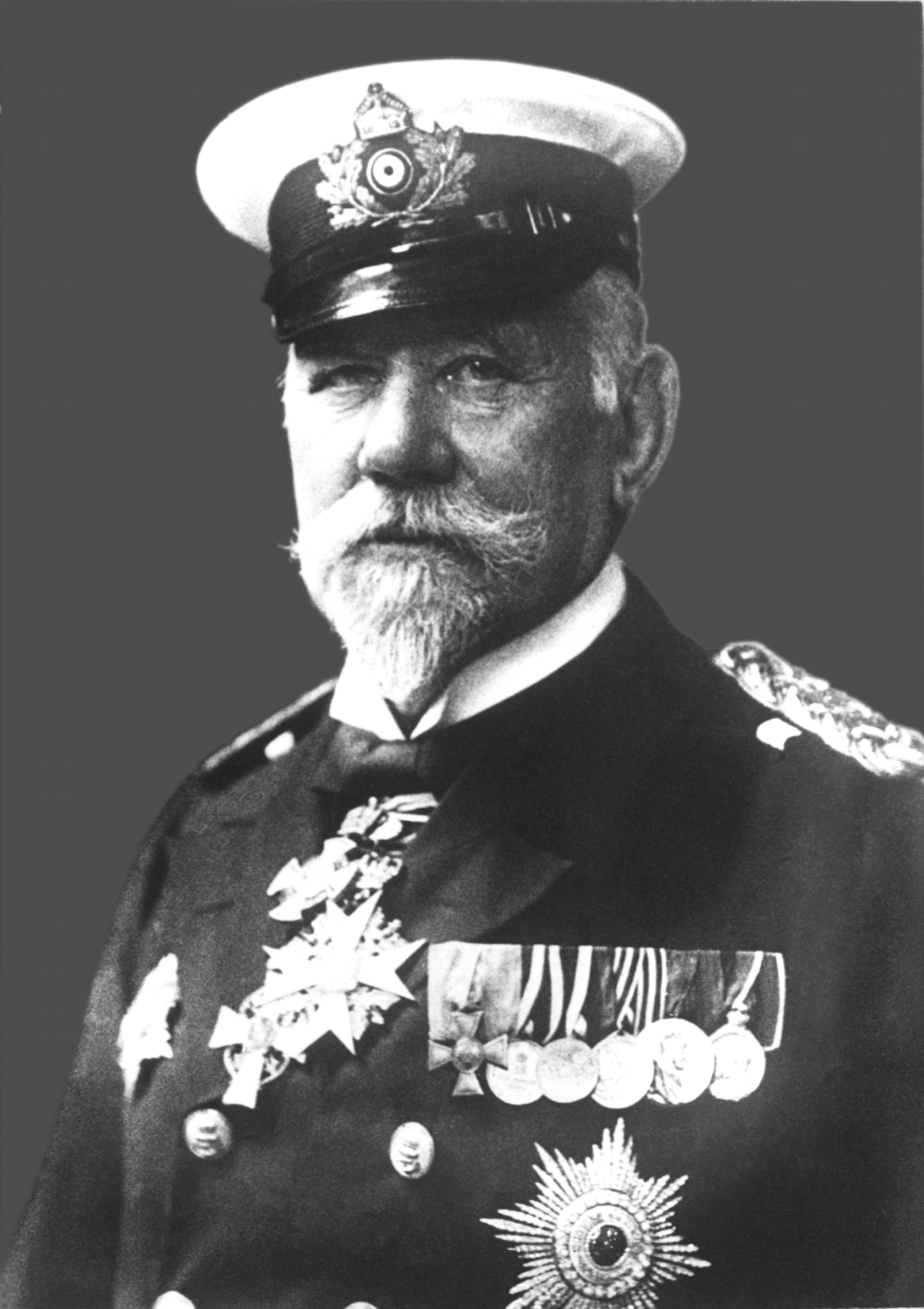
- Hans von Koester
- Born: 29 April 1844; Schwerin
- Died: 21 February 1928 (aged 83); Kiel
- Military career
- Allegiance: Kingdom of Prussia; North German Confederation; German Empire
- Branch: Prussian Navy; North German Federal Navy; Imperial German Navy
- Service years: 1859–1906
- Rank: Grand Admiral
- Awards: Order of the Black Eagle

Signature
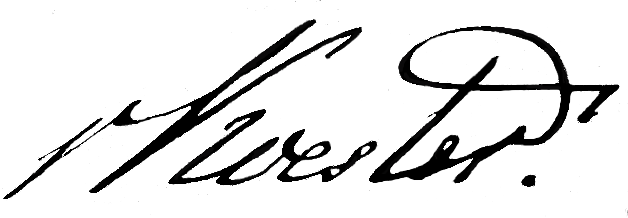

Hans Ludwig Raimund von Koester (29 April 1844 – 21 February 1928) was a German naval officer who served in the Prussian Navy and later in the Imperial German Navy. He retired as a Grand Admiral.

== Career overview ==
Born Hans Ludwig Raimund Koester in 1844 in Schwerin, Mecklenburg-Schwerin, he entered the Prussian Navy as a Kadettenanwärter (Cadet candidate) on 21 June 1859. He had an active seagoing career in the service, which became the North German Federal Navy in 1866, and then the Imperial German Navy in 1871. His first command was the naval brig Undine which he took on a 15-month voyage to North, Central, and South America in 1874–75.

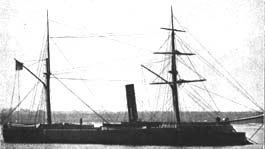
SMS Prinz Adalbert

Promoted to Korvettenkapitän (Lieutenant-Commander) in 1875, he was later assigned to various training ships, the latest of which was the Kreuzerfregatte (cruiser-frigate) Prinz Adalbert, which he took on a world cruise from 1878 to 1880. Koester was promoted to Kapitän zur See in 1881. Appointed commander of the Segelfregatte (sail frigate) Niobe in 1883, Koester next took command of the Panzerkorvette (armored corvette - later battleship) Württemberg in 1884.

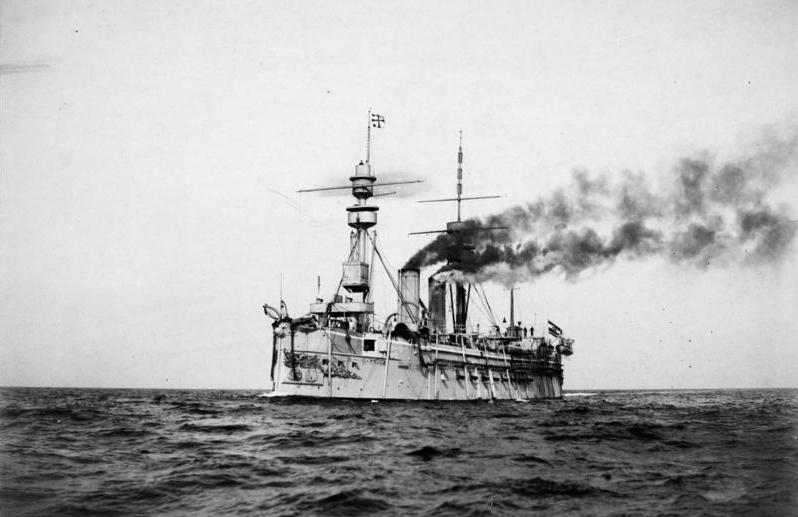
König Wilhelm in 1890

In 1887 he was named commander of the Panzerfregatte (armored frigate - later armored cruiser) König Wilhelm, long the largest ship in the fleet.

From 1884 to 1887 he served 2.5 years as chief of staff of the German Imperial Admiralty (Kaiserliche Admiralität), then headed by Admiral und General der Infanterie Leo von Caprivi. In 1887 he became another 2.5 years as director of the Kaiserliche Werft (Imperial Dockyard) at Kiel. Then, until 1903 he occupied the post as commander of the Baltic Sea Naval Station in Kiel. In this capacity he strongly encouraged development of Kiel as a naval harbor and garrison town.

When Admiral Alfred von Tirpitz presented his plan for a great battle fleet in June 1897, Koester objected on the grounds that there simply were not the personnel to cover such an expansion of the navy, and that the resources would be much better spent elsewhere.

He was promoted to Konteradmiral (rear admiral or commodore) in 1889, Vizeadmiral in 1892, and full admiral in 1897. It was he, as acting commander in chief in place of a sick Admiral Eduard von Knorr, who sent the East Asia Squadron commanded by Otto von Diederichs to the Shandong Peninsula area in the fall of 1897, and who gave the order to take over Kiautschou in November. He was named to the somewhat ceremonial post of Generalinspekteur der Marine (Inspector General of the Navy) in 1899, but retained his post as Commander of the Kiel Naval Station until 1903. In 1900, he was instrumental in uncovering the poor preparation and staffing of the German Imperial Admiralty Staff under Diederichs, which "was a threat to national security." However, along with Vice Admiral August von Thomsen (Commander of the First Naval Division in Wilhelmshaven), he strongly opposed the solution Diederichs proposed: a major increase in the size of the Admiralty Staff, the creation of a separate intelligence section, and the removal of the Naval War College (Marineacademie) to Berlin. In the meantime, he was raised to the German nobility in 1900 as Hans von Koester.

On 18 September 1902 he was decorated with the Order of the Black Eagle. Koester was awarded the 'Diamonds' distinction of this order on 21 June 1909.

Koester became the first active-duty German naval officer to attain the rank of Grossadmiral (Grand Admiral) on 28 June 1905; the previous recipients of this rank were Kaiser Wilhelm II of Germany and King Oscar II of Sweden (both in 1901). Named a member for life of the Prussian House of Lords (Herrenhaus) on 17 September 1905, Koester was retired at his own request on 31 December 1906.

Elected president of the Deutsche Flottenverein (German Fleet Association) in 1908, he held this position until October 1919; thereafter he was honorary president. In this position he worked closely with Admiral Alfred von Tirpitz to raise public support for the navy by promoting "public theater" with navy related activities such as ship launches, which became extremely elaborate after 1900. He represented Germany at the Hudson–Fulton Celebration in New York, 25 September-11 October 1909. Made an honorary citizen of Kiel on his 70th birthday, 29 April 1914, Koester worked during the First World War as a delegate of the Kaiserliche Marine for health care. In 1916-17 he was an advocate of unrestricted submarine warfare.

Koester died in Kiel in 1928 at the age of 83. He was buried in the Nordfriedhof cemetery.

== Decorations and awards ==
He received the following orders and decorations:

National

- Prussia:
  - Commander's Cross of the Royal House Order of Hohenzollern, 13 September 1901
  - Knight of the Black Eagle, 18 September 1902; with Collar and Diamonds, 21 June 1909
  - Grand Cross of the Red Eagle, with Oak Leaves and Crown
  - Knight of the Royal Crown Order, 1st Class
  - Service Award Cross
- Baden:
  - Grand Cross of the Zähringer Lion, with Oak Leaves, 1899
  - Grand Cross of the Order of Berthold the First, 1901
- Bavaria: Grand Cross of the Military Merit Order
- (Saxe-Coburg and Gotha) (Duchy of Saxe-Altenburg) (Saxe-Meiningen) Ernestine duchies: Grand Cross of the Saxe-Ernestine House Order
- Hesse and by Rhine: Grand Cross of the Ludwig Order
- Mecklenburg: Grand Cross of the Griffon
- Oldenburg: Grand Cross of Honour of the Order of Duke Peter Friedrich Ludwig
- Reuss: Cross of Honour, 1st Class with Crown
- Saxe-Weimar-Eisenach: Grand Cross of the White Falcon
- Saxony: Knight of the Rue Crown
- Württemberg: Grand Cross of the Württemberg Crown

Foreign

- (Austrian Empire) (Kingdom of Hungary) Austria-Hungary:
  - Knight of the Iron Crown, 1st Class, 1895
  - Grand Cross of the Imperial Order of Leopold, 1897
- Belgium: Grand Cordon of the Order of Leopold
- Denmark: Knight of the Elephant, 21 July 1905
- Kingdom of Hawaii: Commander of the Order of Kalākaua
- Kingdom of Italy:
  - Grand Officer of Saints Maurice and Lazarus
  - Grand Cross of the Crown of Italy
- Empire of Japan: Order of the Rising Sun, 3rd Class
- Monaco: Grand Cross of St. Charles
- Netherlands: Grand Cross of the Netherlands Lion
- Norway: Commander of St. Olav, 1st Class
- Qing dynasty: Order of the Double Dragon, Grade II Class I
- Russian Empire:
  - Knight of St. Alexander Nevsky, in Diamonds
  - Knight of St. Anna, 1st Class
- Spain: Grand Cross of the Military Merit Order
- Sweden:
  - Commander Grand Cross of the Sword, with Crown, 8 December 1894
  - Knight of the Seraphim, 4 August 1905
- Siam: Grand Cross of the Crown of Siam
- United Kingdom: Honorary Grand Cross of the Royal Victorian Order, 1 July 1904

== Notes ==
- "Germany Sends Von Koester", The New York Times, 23 July 1909.
- James W. Gerard, My Four Years in Germany, p. 108 New York: George H. Doran Company, 1917.

== Sources ==
- Jürgen Hahn-Butry (Hrsg.): Preußisch-deutsche Feldmarschälle und Großadmirale. Safari, Berlin 1938.
- Walther Hubatsch (1980). "Koester, Hans von". Neue Deutsche Biographie (in German). Vol. 12. Berlin: Duncker & Humblot. p. 405.
