= Generalinspekteur der Marine =

Government inspection and regulatory office of the Imperial German Navy

The Generalinspekteur der Marine (Inspector-General of the Navy) was a position in the government of the German Empire. It was founded in 1871 as the command authority of the German Imperial Admiralty and lasted intermittently to 1919.

The first Inspector General was Admiral Prinz Adalbert of Prussia, who had held this position in the predecessor Prussian Navy and the Navy of the North German Confederation. He served under the emperor’s direct command, controlling inspections throughout the navy to maintain regulations for the highest efficiency. When Adalbert died on 6 June 1873, the position was left vacant.

Only in March 1899, when Wilhelm II took over as the supreme commander of the Navy through the Admiralstab (Admiralty Staff) was the Inspector General reactivated. Admiral Hans von Koester held the office from 14 March 1899 until 29 December 1906, when the office was again left vacant.

Admiral Prince Heinrich of Prussia held the office from 1 October 1909 to 10 August 1918.

There exists a similar office (Inspekteur der Marine) in the navy of the modern Federal Republic of Germany.

== List of Generalinspekteur der Marine ==
No.	Portrait	Inspector General	Took office	Left office	Time in office	Ref.
1	Prinz Adalbert of Prussia	Admiral; Prinz Adalbert of Prussia (1811–1873)	1871	6 June 1873 †	1–2 years	-
2	Hans von Koester	Admiral; Hans von Koester (1844–1928)	14 March 1899	29 December 1906	7 years, 290 days	-
3	Prinz Heinrich of Prussia	Admiral; Prinz Heinrich of Prussia (1862–1929)	1 October 1909	10 August 1918	8 years, 313 days	-

== Flags of the Generalinspekteur der Marine ==
Flag of the Generalinspekteur used 1899-1900

Flag of the Generalinspekteur used shortly in 1900

Flag of the Generalinspekteur used 1900-1918

== Sources ==
- Die organisatorische Entwicklung der Marine nebst Stellenbesetzung 1848 bis 1945 / Hans H. Hildebrand. - Osnabrück : Biblio-Verl.; (Formationsgeschichte und Stellenbesetzung der deutschen Streitkräfte 1815 - 1990; Teil II, Band.1, S.74
