= Nieuwediep, Netherlands =

Nieuwediep
- Village
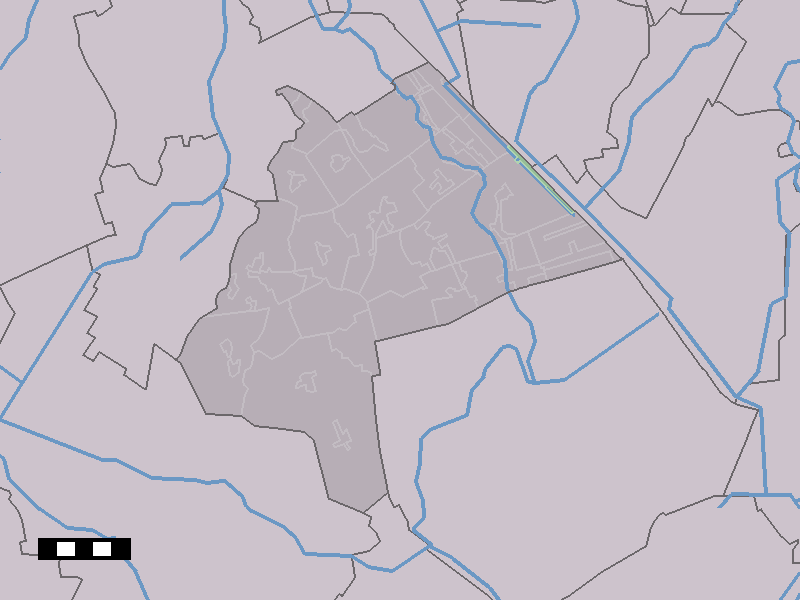
- Nieuwediep in the municipality of Aa en Hunze.

- Location in the Netherlands Nieuwediep (Netherlands)
- Coordinates: 53.04315°N 6.85652°E
- Country: Netherlands
- Province: Drenthe
- Municipality: Aa en Hunze

Area
  - Total: 1.06 km^{2} (0.41 sq mi)
- Elevation: 3.6 m (12 ft)

Population (2021)
  - Total: 265
  - Density: 250/km^{2} (647/sq mi)
- Time zone: UTC+1 (CET)
  - Summer (DST): UTC+2 (CEST)
- Postal code: 9512
- Dialing code: 0598

Nieuwediep is a village in the Dutch province of Drenthe. It is a part of the municipality of Aa en Hunze, and lies about 20 km east of Assen.

In the Statenvertaling Bible containing 200 illustrations by Gustave Doré, 5 sponsors of the Bible is recorded under the place name “Nieuwediep” namely JC de Buisonjé (a bookseller); H Hovy; LA Laureij ( a bookseller); W Steffens and PD Visser. Dating to 1870 this was probably the first reference to the village. The village is again mentioned in 1913 as Nieuwe diep (Het), and means "new canal". It can be used both for the canal and the village. The canal was dug in the middle of the 19th century to excavate the peat in the area. The school in the village closed down in 1995, and is currently in use as village house.

== Gallery ==
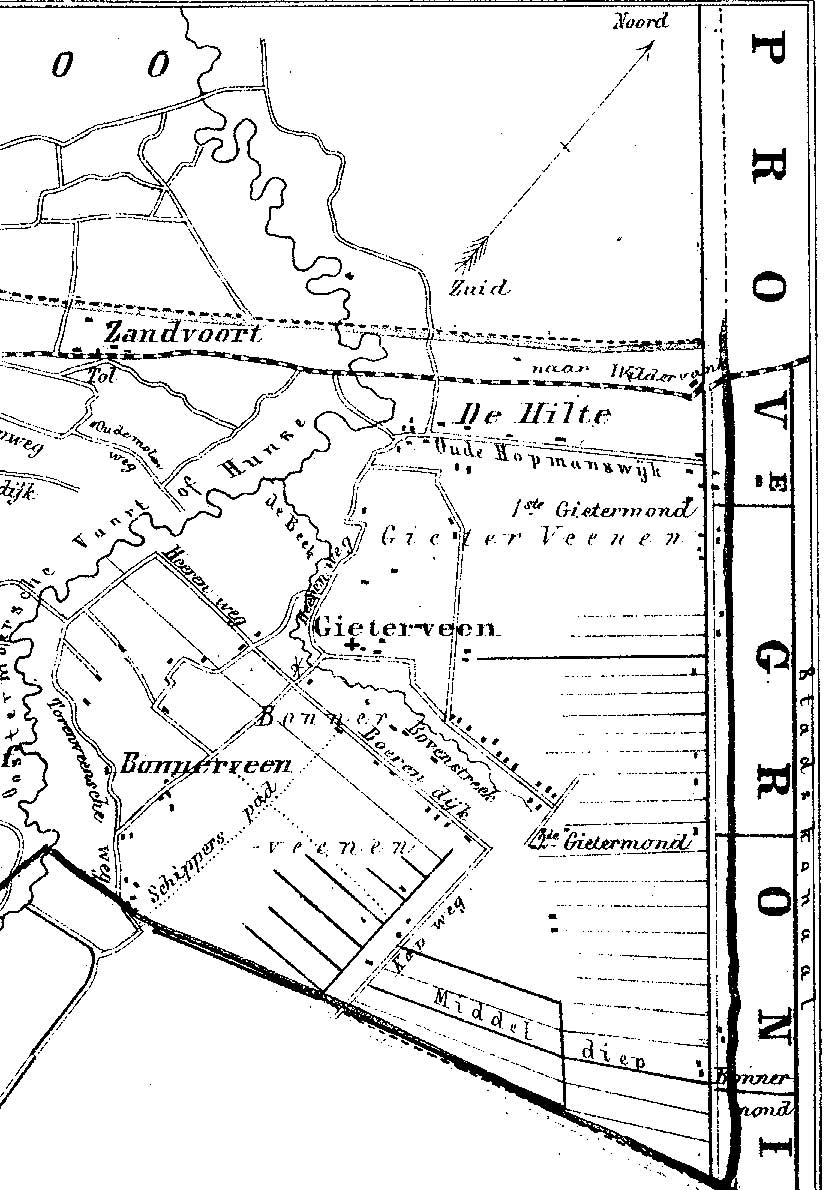
Nieuwediep on an 1867 map
