= Leon Pająk =

Polish army officer

- Leon Pająk in 1939
- Born: October 5, 1909; Krasna Dąbrowa, Poland
- Died: November 26, 1990 (aged 81); Kielce, Poland
- Burial place: Old Cemetery in Kielce
- Military career
- Branch: Army of the 2nd Polish Republic
- Service years: 1930 - 1946
- Rank: Lieutenant
- Units: 20th Infantry Regiment of the Krakow Land, 4th Legions Infantry Division, 9th Bolgna Carpathian Rifle Battalion
- Conflicts: World War 2, Battle of Westerplatte
- Awards: Order of the Virtuti Militari

Leon Pająk (October 5, 1909, in Krasna Dąbrowa, November 26, 1990, in Kielce) was an officer in the Polish Army who fought in the Battle of Westerplatte during the Invasion of Poland in 1939. He was awarded the Order of Virtuti Militari.

== Military service and the Battle of Westerplatte ==
He began his military service in 1930 as a private in the 20th Infantry Regiment of the Krakow Land in Kraków. In 1931 he enrolled at the Infantry Cadet School in Ostrów Mazowiecka. He was commissioned as an officer on 15 August 1934. Pająk received his first assignment in the 4th Legions Infantry Regiment in Kielce, where he took command of an infantry platoon. In March 1938, he became commander of a heavy machine gun company. On March 15, 1939, he was promoted to the rank of lieutenant and together with the formation of a guard platoon, was sent to the Military Transit Depot in Westerplatte.

During the defense of the WST, he commanded the "Prom" outpost where he took command of the 75mm field gun, laying down heavy suppressing fire on the advancing Germans and knocking out several machine gun nests set up across the harbor. Later in the fight, he was seriously wounded in the abdomen, perineum and legs, and transported to the barracks where, despite his hopeless condition, he survived the battle due to the actions of the head medic, Capt. Mieczysław Słaby. He spent until January of the next year recovering in a German hospital. Subsequently, he was imprisoned in the POW camps, Oflags XII A in Hadamar and VII A in Murnau.

After being liberation from captivity, he was accepted into the 2nd Polish Corps in Italy where he commanded the 4th company of the 9th Bologna Carpathian Rifle Battalion.

== Later life and death ==
He returned to Poland on 5 December 1946. He settled in Kielce, where he worked in the metalworking industry. On September 1, 1971, during the ceremony of laying the ashes of Major Henryk Sucharski, commander of the Westerplatte garrison, he submitted his last report to his commander, in which he said the words: "Mr. Major, Westerplatte is Polish again!". In 1985 he was entered into The Honorary Book of Soldiers' Deeds. He became an honorary citizen of Gdańsk and Kielce. He was also a member and long-term president of the Kielce branch of ZBoWiD (The Society of Fighters for Freedom and Democracy).

Pająk died on November 26, 1990, and was buried in the Old Cemetery in Kielce.

== Awards ==
Order of the Virtuti Militari No. 11940

== Cultural depictions ==
In the 1967 film Westerplatte, directed by Stanisław Różewicz, Lt. Pająk was portrayed by Bogdan Niewinowski.

In the 2013 film Tajemnica Westerplatte or 1939 Battle of Westerplatte, Lt. Pająk was portrayed by Bartosz Obuchowicz.
