= Westerplatte (film) =

1967 Polish film by Stanisław Różewicz

- Directed by: Stanisław Różewicz
- Written by: Jan Józef Szczepański
- Starring: Zygmunt Hübner, Arkadiusz Bazak
- Cinematography: Jerzy Wójcik
- Music by: Wojciech Kilar
- Release date: 1 September 1967
- Running time: 96 minutes
- Country: Poland
- Language: Polish

Westerplatte or Westerplatte Resists (Pl. Westerplatte broni się nadal) is a 1967 Polish historical film directed by Stanisław Różewicz. It was entered into the 5th Moscow International Film Festival where it won a Silver Prize.

The story is based upon the Battle of Westerplatte in September 1939.

== Cast ==
- Zygmunt Hübner as Maj. Henryk Sucharski
- Arkadiusz Bazak as Capt. Franciszek Dąbrowski
- Tadeusz Schmidt as Ens. Jan Gryczman
- Józef Nowak as Cpl. Piotr Buder
- Tadeusz Pluciński as Cpl. Bronisław Grudziński
- Bogusz Bilewski as Capt. Mieczysław Slaby, Medical Officer
- Bohdan Ejmont as Mate Bernard Rygielski
- Mariusz Gorczynski as Pvt. Jan Czywil
- Zbigniew Józefowicz as Sgt. Kazimierz Rasiński, Radio Operator
- Jerzy Kaczmarek as Cpl. Władysław Baran
- Andrzej Kozak as Pvt. Eugeniusz Aniołek
- Andrzej Krasicki as Col. Karl Henke
- Adam Kwiatkowski as Cpl. Władysław Domoń
- Józef Lodynski as Sgt. Wojciech Najsarek, Station-Master
- Mieczyslaw Milecki as Lt. Stefan Grodecki
- Janusz Mirczewski as Cpl. Franciszek Magdziarz
