= Westerplatte Guard House No. 1 =

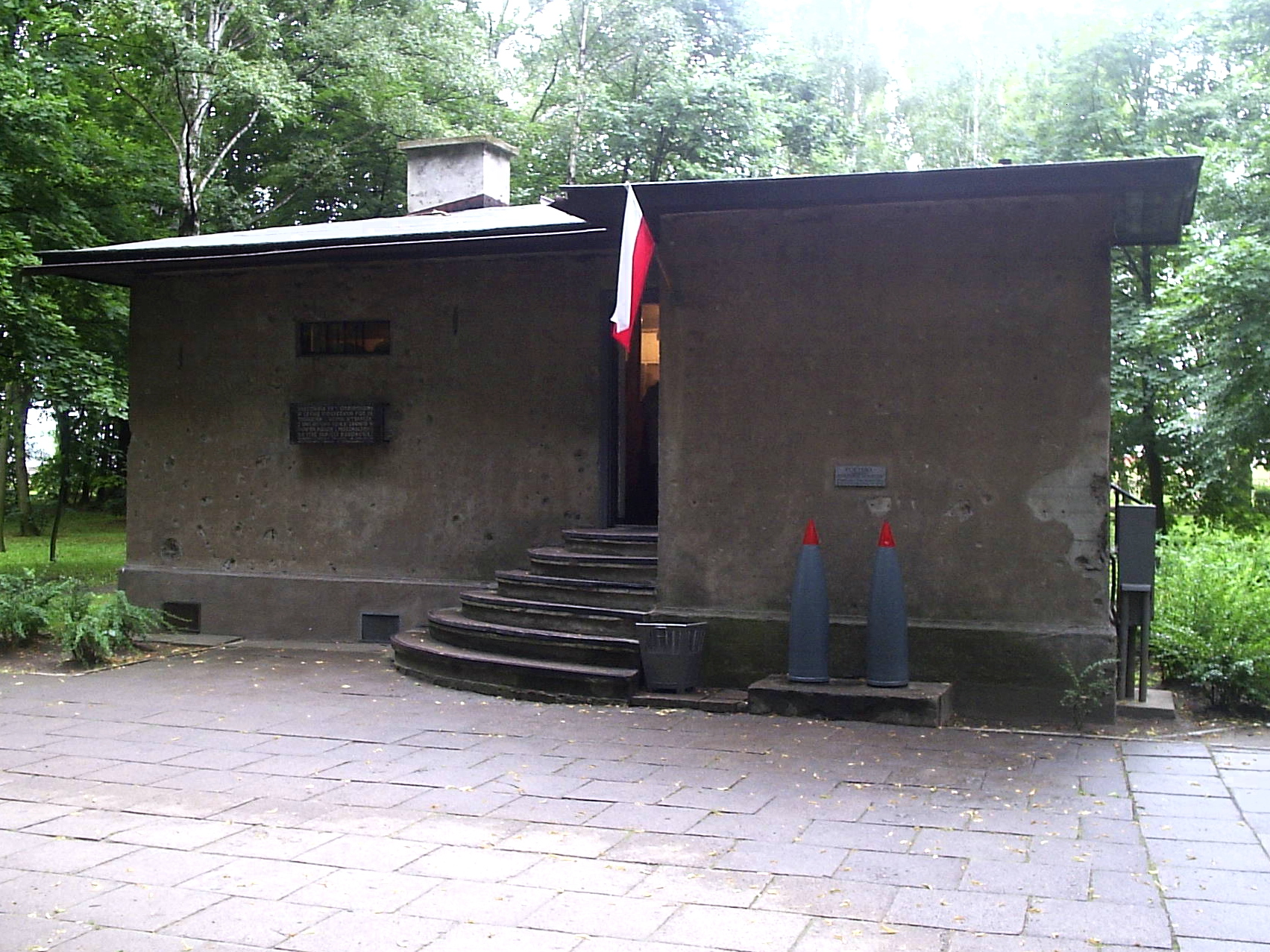
- The entrance to the Guard House

General information
- Location: Westerplatte; Przeróbka, Gdańsk
- Coordinates: 54.4060°N 18.6759°E
- Year built: 1933–1934
- Completed: 1934
- Renovated: 1967
- Owner: Gdańsk Museum

Westerplatte Guard House No. 1 (Polish: Wartownia nr 1 na Westerplatte) is a guard house located in Westerplatte, Gdańsk, significant for its role during the Battle of Westerplatte. It was built in 1934 and remains intact to this day. It is on the regional heritage list.

== History ==
In accordance with a 1924 decision of the League of Nations, in 1926, the Westerplatte peninsula of Danzig (later known as Gdańsk) was handed over to the Second Polish Republic for military use. From 1933 to 1934, after and before several other fortifications were built, a series of guard houses were constructed by the Polish on the peninsula, with Guard House No. 1 being one of them. The small building was heavily fortified despite its size, with two locations for machine guns and strong, reliable shielding for anyone manning it.

As of 1 September 1939, the Guard House was crewed by 14 men under the command of plut. Piotr Buder. Around 4:45 a.m. that day, the German battleship SMS Schleswig-Holstein fired some of the first shots of World War II upon Westerplatte, beginning the Battle of Westerplatte. The guard house, despite suffering significant damage in an air raid on 2 September, remained a major repellant of German forces and only capitulated on 7 September, after the final attack, remaining intact.

The building was saved from demolition in 1967 after it was moved to its current location in a complex operation. In 1974, under the guardianship of four defenders of Westerplatte, the guard house began being occupied by an exposition of various artifacts and militaria of the Battle of Westerplatte. Exhibits include a faithful reconstruction of the Guard House's interior in September 1939, various maps of the peninsula, as well as military uniforms and models.

Today, the Guard House is one of the central locations in Westerplatte for tourism and commemorations. It also serves as a place for the archival, storage, and exhibition of a variety of Westerplatte artifacts and records.
