= Fortifications of Westerplatte =

The Polish were granted access to the Westerplatte Peninsula by the League of Nations in 1924 to build a military transit depot (WST). Some of the conditions of granting the peninsula to the Polish were that they could not have more than 88 military personnel, and build fortifications. The peninsula was separated from the Free City of Danzig by a 2m tall brick wall that ran across the base of the peninsula. In the summer of 1933, Polish authorities decided to secretly begin building fortifications on the peninsula as the threat of German aggression became more real. The first fortifications were several concrete blockhouses, light shelters, and gun emplacements.

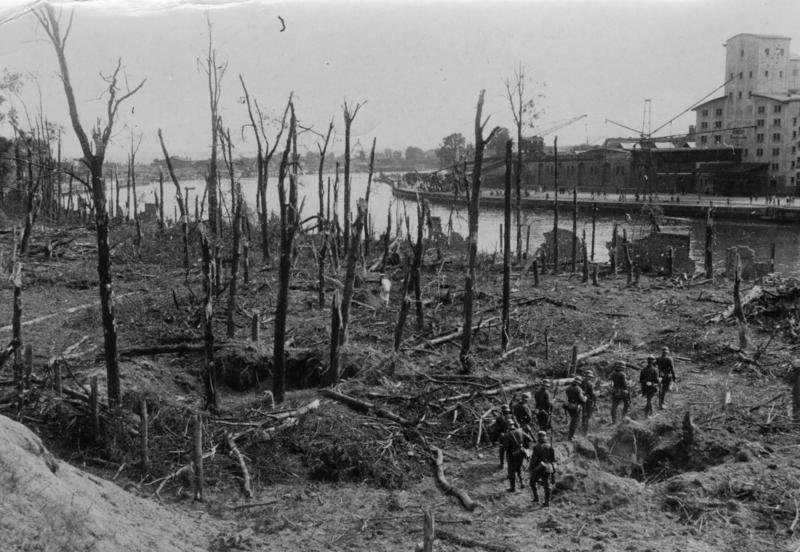
German Marines pick their way through the remains of the forest on Westerplatte. Along the shore you can see parts of the brick wall that was obliterated by the battleship Schleswig-Holstein.

There were 3 lines of defense, although it was not of the typical lateral type, and was arranged in rough concentric circles. The first line consisted of earthen outposts named “Ferry”, “Baths”, “Embankment”, “Fort”, “Power Station”, and “Marina”. The second line was 5 guardhouses No. I, II, III, IV, and V. The Third defensive line consisted of Guardhouse No. VI, Outpost “Dieka” and the Tor Kolejowy Gate. The defenses of Westerplatte were meant to hold out for 12 hours while reinforcements from Pomerania arrived. The Polish defenders of the peninsula surrendered on Sept. 7, 1939, 7 days after they were supposed to hold out.

== First line of defense ==
=== Outpost “Prom” ===
The Prom outpost, also known as the “Ferry” outpost, is one of the first fortifications you would encounter as you advanced up the Westerplatte Peninsula. Prom was built on top of a small hill, giving it a commanding view of the tiny peninsula. The outpost was defended by just 14 men in trenches with some log coverings. The small garrison was armed with 3 light machine guns, 1 81mm Stokes mortar, as well as whatever small arms they were equipped with.

At 4:47am on Sept. 1, 1939, the German battleship SMS Schleswig-Holstein fired part of its main armament of 4 28cm guns at the defenders of the Westerplatte Peninsula, these would be the first shots of World War II. The shells were meant to breach the brick wall separating Westerplatte and Danzig, as well as to signal for the German Marines to commence the assault. The defenders of Prom were quickly scrambled to their positions after the first shots rang out. Shortly after, 225 German Marines launched an assault on the Westerplatte Peninsula, but had to capture Prom to advance. They had been in the internal holds of Schleswig-Holstein, and had been the ones to occupy the Memel Territory in March of 1939. The marines were later stopped at the Poles’ second line of defense by machine gun and mortar fire from Prom.

The outpost bore a good amount during the fighting during the morning. An hour later, the Schutzpolizei, the local police, began crossing the Vistula just outside of the brick wall and began firing on Prom. 3 men were dispatched from the outpost to eliminate the police with grenades. Corporal Zygmunt Kowalczyk was mortally wounded during this action, and another soldier, Bronislaw Uss, died. As a result of the mission, the police ceased shooting at the defenders of Prom.

Shortly after, the German marines launched another attack, and Prom was nearly overwhelmed. The commander of the outpost, Lt. Pajak, used his field telephone to call Major Henryk Sucharski for supporting mortar fire from the other 5 81mm mortars. The 5 mortars were positioned near the barracks and began firing and calibrating their weapons using pre-set firing data established before the war. Due to the short distance between the barracks and Prom, the shells from the 81mm mortars reach extreme heights before detonating in the ranks of the German marines pinned down in front of Prom.

Because of German losses, the commander of Schleswig-Holstein decided to bring the battleship closer. From where she was originally moored, she could barely use her 28cm guns due to the proximity of the defenses and the fact that the guns couldn’t go any lower. The battleship opened up with her numerous 15cm guns and even her 2cm anti-aircraft guns. Lt. Pajak was seriously wounded as the battleship drew near, and the Polish defenders abandoned Prom due to the heavy shelling from Schleswig-Holstein.

=== Gun Position “Fort” ===
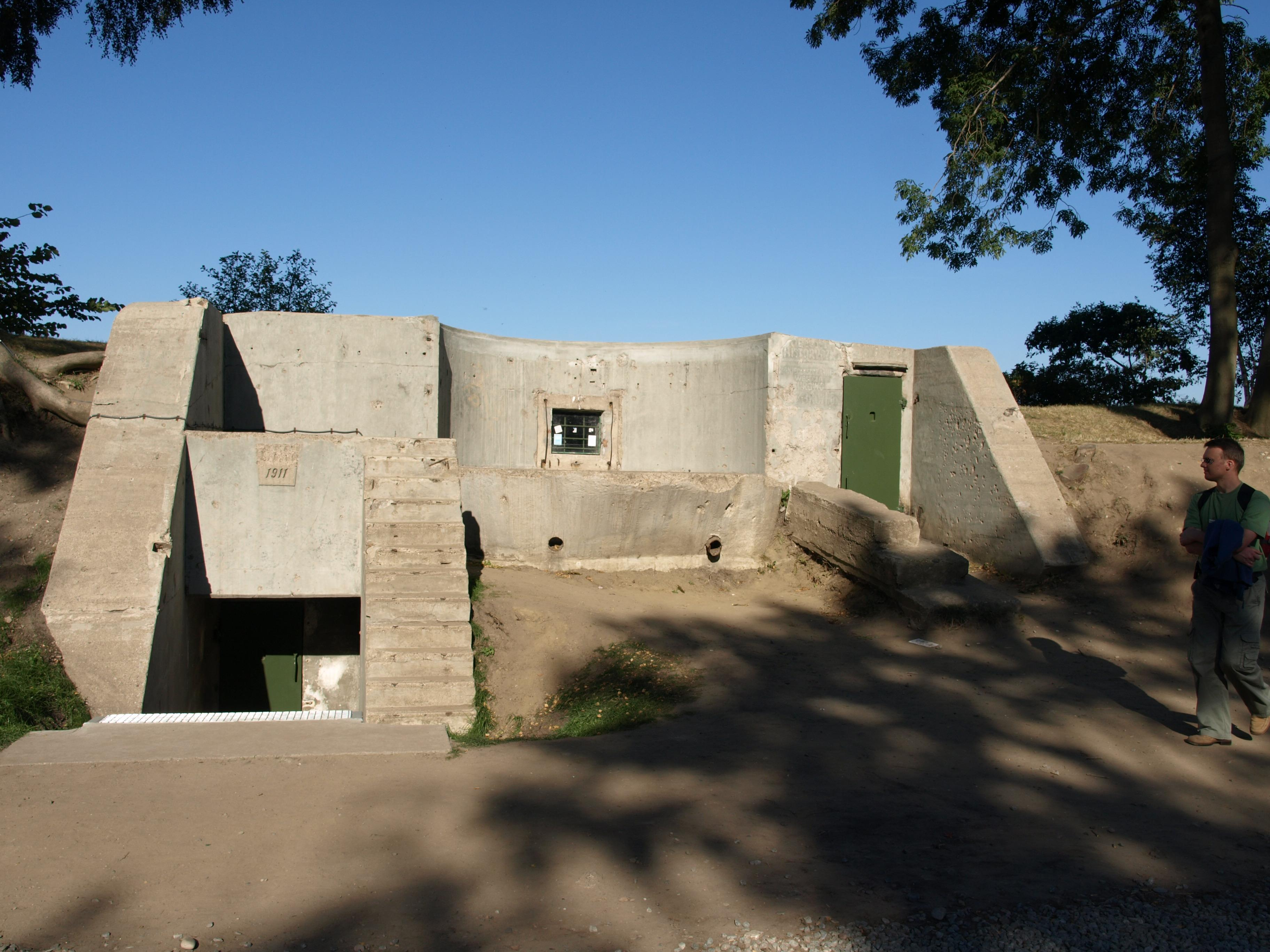
The rear of the "Fort" outpost. In the middle would be a naval gun, while on the lower left down the stairs would be where the ammo was stored.

Gun Position Fort was located on the Baltic side of the Westerplatte Peninsula. It was originally constructed by Imperial German forces before World War I, and was a position for German coastal guns during the war. The gun position was not equipped for an attack coming from the landward side of the position, so the 3 defenders had to emplace a machine gun there. After Schleswig-Holstein’s shots rang out, Seaman Rygielski and 2 other men scrambled to the outpost with a machine gun. They arrived just in time to find the SS-Heimwehr, a Nazi paramilitary unit in Danzig (Gdansk), attacking across the breakwater. The 3 men fired on the SS-Heimwehr until the light machine gun jammed, and Seaman Rygielski had to remove a heavy machine gun from its housing nearby and set it up on one of the concrete walls of the gun position. The gun position repelled an attack by German Marines later in the day, and the commander of the German troops, Lt. Henningsen, was mortally wounded from fire from the Fort outpost.

=== Outpost “Wal” ===
Outpost Wal, also known as Outpost Rampart, was part of the first line of defenses across the Westerplatte Peninsula. It is fitting that the name translates to rampart, as the outpost is an earthen position with raised walls protecting a central area. The outpost was not meant to be held for very long, just long enough to man the defenses of the second line. The outpost was commanded by Corporal Edmund Szamlewski, and was manned by 5 other men. After 2 German assaults, at 6:00am on Sept. 1, the defenders of Wal retreated towards Outpost Prom.

=== Outpost “Przystan” ===
Outpost Przystan, also known as Outpost “Pier”, was a semi-earthen fortification with some concrete structures. It consisted of a masonry wall facing towards Danzig and 3 concrete shelters for 1 75mm anti-tank gun and 2 50mm anti-tank guns. The 75mm AT gun was stored in the center bunker and the 2 50mm AT guns on either side. The 75mm gun was wheeled out during the Battle of Westerplatte and engaged SS-Heimwehr machine gunners on the other side of the Vistula. The 2 50mm guns bravely engaged the Schleswig-Holstein as she pulled up anchor and began to more thoroughly bombard the peninsula.

=== Outpost “Elektrownia” ===
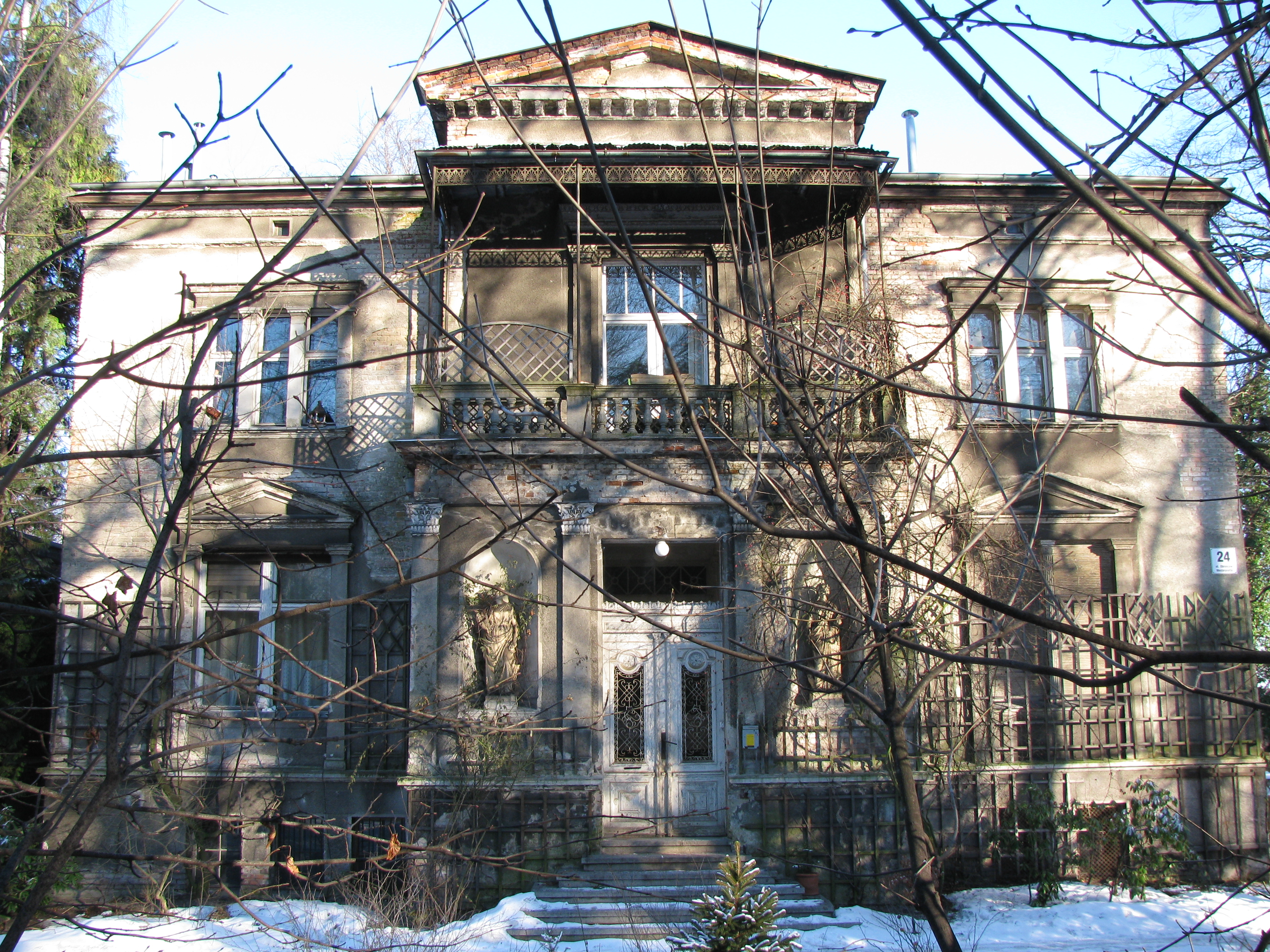
The old power station of Westerplatte. It provided power to Westerplatte so that they didn't have to rely on power from Gdansk.

The Outpost was built 170m from the peninsula’s power station, hence why the name translates to power plant in Polish. The power plant is also part of Elektrownia’s defense, helping block any amphibious landing that might come from the area of the offloading cranes and ammo dumps.

=== Scout Post “Kej” ===
Scout Post Kej, it was access from the rear and was armed with a single machine gun in a casemate.

Scout Post Kej was located behind guardhouse No. IV, and was a camouflaged earthen position meant for observing the area between the first and second lines of defense. Today the scout post is in good condition on the outside. However, the condition inside is not mentioned

=== Outpost “Lazlenki” ===
Outpost Lazlenki, also known as Outpost Lazienki, was located behind Guardhouse No. IV. Not much is written about the outpost other than it was in the first line of defense and guarded the harbor, which is what Lazlenki loosely translates to.

== Second line of defense ==
=== Guardhouse No. I ===
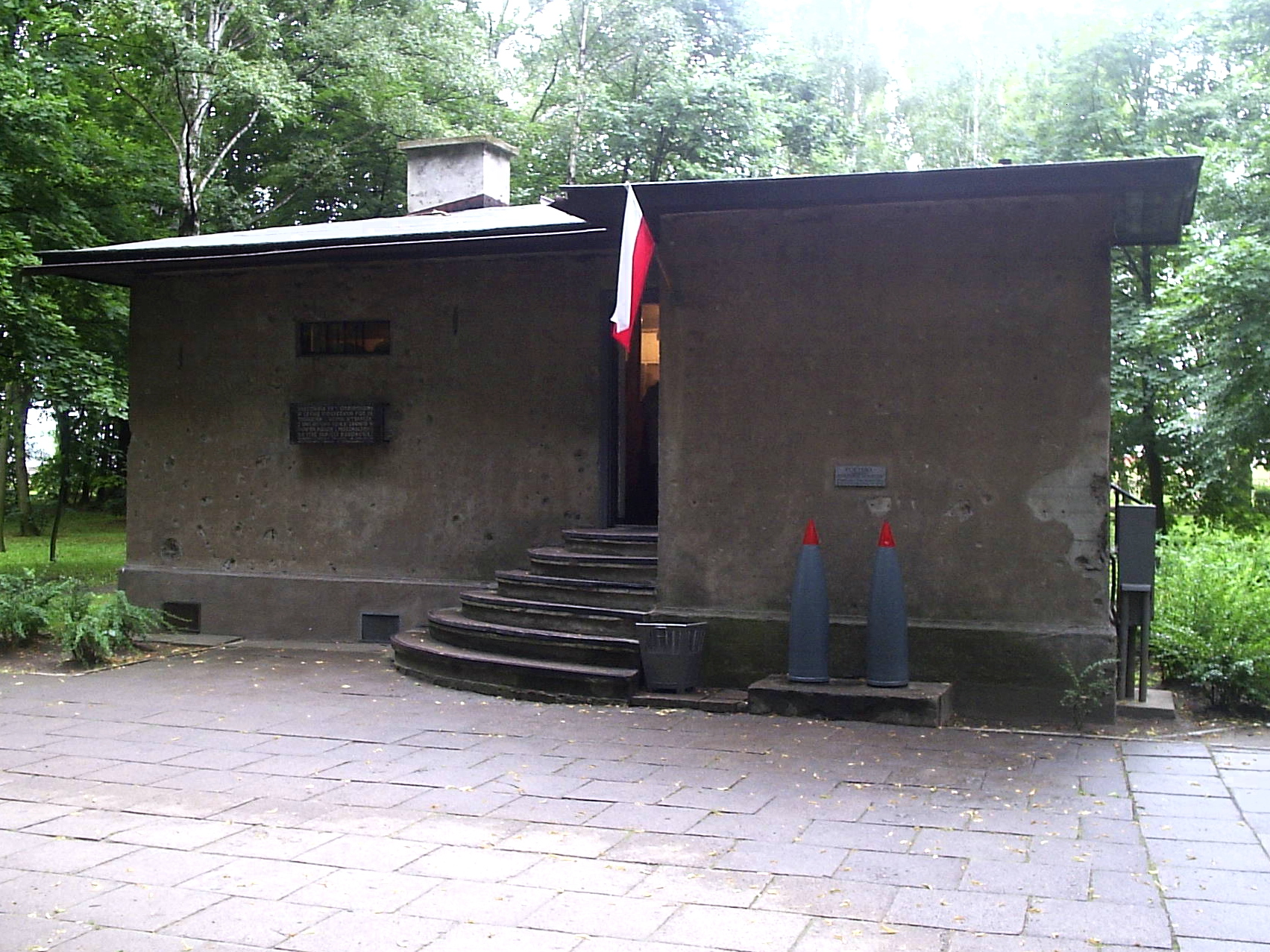
Guardhouse No. I, you can see the various shell splinters from the bombs dropped on Sept. 2. Along the side of the building you can see 2 shells, these are 2 28cm shells just like the ones fired from Schleswig-Holstein. They are used to prop open the museum door.

Guardhouse No. I was located between Guardhouse No. II and Outpost “Fort”, in the center of the peninsula. The guardhouse was the lynchpin of Polish defenses on the SE side of the Westerplatte Peninsula, because it could cover the outposts of “Wal” and “Prom” with machine gun fire, was located along the main road, and was covered by machine guns in Guardhouse No. II and Outpost “Fort”. Around 12:00pm on Sept. 1, a German assault combined with Schleswig-Holstein’s gun forced the defenders of the outposts “Prom” and “Wal” to retreat towards the second line of defenses. The assault broke down in the face of concentrated fire from the mortars and Guardhouses 1, 2, 5, and the “Fort” outpost. The next day, the guardhouse was bombed by Stukas of the Stukageschwader 2 “Immelmann”. Bombs burst around the guardhouse, but the only damage was a few bomb splinters. On Sept. 4, A renewed assault by German Marines and Pioneers, who had just been flown in, was repulsed. This is surprising considering that the Pioneers were trained in taking fortifications and were using flamethrowers. The guardhouse managed to survive World War II, and was saved from demolition in 1967 by moving the structure a couple dozen meters. Today, Guardhouse No. I is a museum and is a branch office of the Museum of Gdańsk.

=== Guardhouse No. II ===
Guardhouse No. II was located on the Vistula side of the Westerplatte Peninsula, just behind Outpost “Prom”. The guardhouse helped repel a German assault that forced the abandonment of Outposts “Prom” and “Wal” around noon Sept. 1. Around 4:30am on Sept. 7, Schleswig-Holstein brought her 28cm guns to bear on Guardhouse No. II. At first, it looked like the guardhouse might make it through, but then a shell sheared through the northeastern corner of the building. As the shell tore through, Corporal Grudzinski ordered his men into the underground shelter beneath the guardhouse. Another shell completely demolished the entrance, a third hit the eastern wall and destroyed 2 machine guns in their housings. In a final Coup De Grace, a shell hit the ammunition storage and mostly demolished the guardhouse. With Guardhouse No. II gone, the Polish lost a vital strongpoint in the defense of Westerplatte.

=== Guardhouse No. III ===
Only the foundation remains from Guardhouse No. 3. In the background, you can see the remains of the "New" Barracks.

Guardhouse No. III is not like the conventional guardhouses found on the Westerplatte Peninsula. It was built beneath the enlisted men’s recreation hall, and featured small embrasures that could be fired from the basement. The enlisted men’s recreation hall was destroyed by artillery fire during the battle, and all that remains is the concrete foundation.

=== Guardhouse No. IV ===
Guardhouse No. IV was located near Scout Post “Kej” and was about equidistant between Outposts “Fort” and “Lazienki”. The guardhouse was just like the Guardhouses No. I, II, and V, and was equipped with an underground shelter as well as numerous ports for machine guns. The guardhouse was tasked with protecting the rail line that ran to the ammunition storage shelters. The guardhouse was lucky during the Battle of Westerplatte, as it didn’t sustain much damage. It was demolished sometime after World War II ended.

=== Guardhouse No. V ===
Guardhouse No. V is located between Guardhouse No. VI and Outpost “Fort”. Guardhouse No. V, alongside Guardhouse No. I, was meant to take the brunt of the fighting if enemy forces broke through the first line of defenses. Since Guardhouse No. V was located behind Guardhouses I and II, it could provide flanking machine gun fire in support of their positions. On Sept. 2, A raid by Stukas of Stukageschwader 2 “Immelmann” scored a direct hit on the guardhouse with a 500kg bomb. All 8 men inside were killed and the guardhouse was reduced to ruins. Today only the half buried foundation remains.

== Third line of defense ==
=== Guardhouse No. VI ===
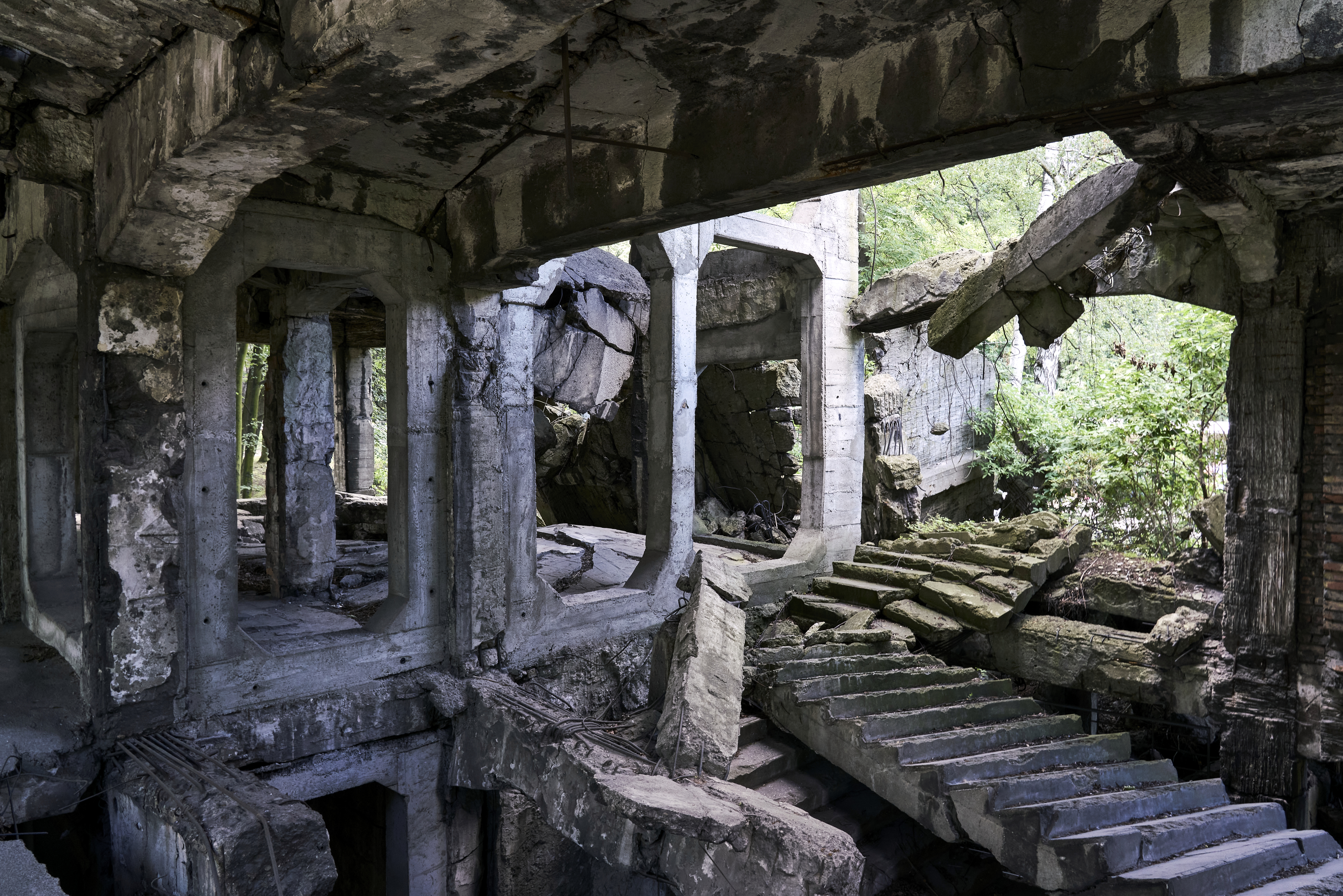
The twisted and mangled interior of the "New" Barracks.

Guardhouse No. VI, also called the “New” Barracks, is located at the center of the Westerplatte Peninsula. The barracks were constructed between 1934 and 1935, with the mission of providing the garrison with a safer shelter. The “New” Barracks was constructed out of reinforced concrete, as this was part of being a safer shelter. The barracks were modern, containing central heating, washing stations, an infirmary, and even a radio station. Within the basement was shelter in case of an air raid, as well as numerous mounts for both light and heavy machine guns. The barracks became crucial for defense when Guardhouse No. II was destroyed. The “New” Barracks ended the Battle of Westerplatte in pretty good condition. The damage we see today is from when Soviet forces flattened Danzig in 1945.

=== Outpost "Dieka" ===
Outpost Dieka was located on the Vistula side of the Westerplatte Peninsula, and was SE of Guardhouse No. III. The outpost was a small earthen position armed with a light machine gun and crewed by 3 men under the leadership of Sgt. Wladyslaw Dieka. At 7am on Sept. 1, just after German marines pulled back, Sgt. Dieka ordered his men to abandon their position and set up a position near the ammo shelters. The men of Outpost Dieka helped dig out the bodies trapped in Guardhouse No. V on Sept. 2, 1939.

=== Tor Kolejowy Gate ===
Tor Kolejowy translates to “Railway Track” in Polish, and was meant to guard the railway lines. While Tor Kolejowy was not armed, it was a heavily reinforced railway gate located at the base of the Westerplatte Peninsula. It was destroyed by German marines just after the initial bombardment by SMS Schleswig-Holstein on the morning of Sept. 1, 1939.

=== Anti-infantry defenses ===
Along the base of the Westerplatte Peninsula, there was a 2m high brick wall that separated the Free City of Danzig from the military depot. This was quickly breached by shells from Schleswig-Holstein on Sept. 1, 1939. The German marines filed through the holes shot in the wall during the initial assault, however the Polish defenses were set in such a way that they anticipated the breaching of the wall and sited their defenses to face towards the wall. Along the Vistula side of the peninsula, there were multiple rows of barbed wire meant to deter any amphibious attack. Farther down the peninsula, near where the Vistula meets the sea, was a brick wall and bulwark that was covered by Outpost “Przystan”. SS-Heimwehr troops attempted to land here but were repulsed by the lack of breaching equipment for the brick wall and the intense defensive fire.
