= Karol Szwedowski =

Karol Szwedowski (1878–1941) was a Polish master builder who worked at Westerplatte and defended it when Poland was invaded by Germany in 1939.

== Early life and career ==
Karol Szwedowski was born on October 4, 1878, in Chrząstowo (now part of Koniecpol), the son of Jozefa and Jacenty Szwedowski. On December 13, 1927, at the age of 38, he received his master builder diploma and was accepted to the Craftsmen's Guild of the city of Pułtusk. On April 4, 1934, he arrived in Gdańsk from Legionowo. He was hired as a seasonal contract worker by the Military Transit Depot of Westerplatte, where he worked until 1939.

== Battle of Westerplatte ==
During the Battle of Westerplatte on September 1–7, 1939, Szwedowski was called on as a civilian defender and assisted wounded soldiers. After the battle, Szwedowski was arrested by the Germans and imprisoned in Stutthof concentration camp, and later at Buchenwald.

== Death ==
He died after his release at home in Legionowo on August 30, 1941, (Note: based on the record books of the General Governorship in Legionowo (document number 105 of the year 1941). The death certificate states that Karol Szwedowski, son of Jacenty (father) and Jozefa (mother), died in Legionowo at on August 30, 1941, at the age of 52.) shortly after the deaths of his two sons, Ryszard in the Palmiry massacre in 1940 and Karol in Auschwitz in 1941.

== Media ==
Szwedowski is mentioned in the book Westerplatte published by Wydawnictwo Ministerstwa Obrony Narodowej (the Publishing House of the Ministry of National Defense) in Warsaw in 1978. He was portrayed by Bolesław Płotnicki in the 1967 feature film Westerplatte directed by Stanisław Rozewicz, and in the 2013 Polish film Tajemnica Westerplatte ("The Secret of Westerplatte"), he was played by Romuald Kłos.
