= Pająk =

Pająk (Polish pronunciation: [ˈpajɔŋk]) is a Polish surname, meaning "spider". Pajonk is a phonetic respelling. Notable people with the surname include:

== People ==
=== Pająk ===
- Antoni Pająk (1893–1965), Polish politician
- Daria Pająk (born 1993), Polish bowler
- Grzegorz Pająk (born 1987), Polish volleyball player
- Henryk Pająk (born 1937), Polish writer, journalist and publisher
- Janusz Pająk (born 1944), Polish wrestler
- Leon Pająk (1909–1990), Polish army officer
- Marek Pająk (born 1977), Polish musician and singer

=== Pajak ===
- Frédéric Pajak (born 1955), French illustrator and writer
- John Pajak (1932–2009), American judge

=== Pajonk ===
- Dirk-Achim Pajonk (born 1969), German athlete
- Tomáš Pajonk (born 1981), Czech politician
