= 1939 Battle of Westerplatte =

- Polish theatrical poster
- Polish: Tajemnica Westerplatte
- Directed by: Paweł Chochlew
- Produced by: Robert Żołędziewski
- Starring: Michał Żebrowski
- Music by: Jan A.P. Kaczmarek
- Release date: February 15, 2013
- Running time: 118 minutes
- Countries: Poland; Lithuania
- Language: Polish
- Budget: 14 million złoty

1939 Battle of Westerplatte, originally titled in Poland as Tajemnica Westerplatte ("The Secret of Westerplatte"), is a 2013 Polish-Lithuanian war film written and directed by Paweł Chochlew. It portrays the Battle of Westerplatte between the Polish Army and Nazi German forces at the start of World War II in 1939. The film focuses on the conflict between Westerplatte commander Henryk Sucharski (Michał Żebrowski) and his deputy Franciszek Dąbrowski (Robert Żołędziewski).

== Cast ==
- Michał Żebrowski − as Major Henryk Sucharski
- Robert Żołędziewski − as Capt. Franciszek Dąbrowski
- Borys Szyc − as Lieut. Stefan Grodecki
- Piotr Adamczyk − as Capt. Mieczysław Słaby
- Jan Englert − as Wincenty Sobociński
- Jakub Wesołowski − as Bernard Rygielski
- Andrzej Grabowski − as Adolf Petzelt
- Przemysław Cypryański − as Lieut. Zdzisław Kręgielski
- Mirosław Baka − as Cpl. Eugeniusz Grabowski
- Mirosław Zbrojewicz − as Jan Gryczman

== Reception ==
The film has sparked some controversy with allegations saying it was "anti-Polish" and "unpatriotic" in its revisionist attitude to the heroic myth of the Battle of Westerplatte which became a symbol of the against-the-odds defiance to the Nazi invasion, and a group of historians even dismissed it as a false depiction of the battle that is being "offensive to the dignity and honour of Polish soldiers." According to The Telegraph, "while the film has garnered its detractors, cinema critics have dismissed claims that The Secret of Westerplatte belittles the soldiers who fought and died in the battle. One critic described it as a "hymn to the heroism of the defenders of Westerplatte.'"

Possibly in an attempt to deflect the negative criticism, which the title word "Tajemnica" (Secret), implying as it does that the film makes revelations and runs against the long-held perception of the battle as an heroic Polish defence, publicity posters omitting the word were produced and at least three other versions of the title have been used. These range from the non-committal "1939 Westerplatzer Battlefield" and "1939 Battle of Westerplatte" to another version that unambiguously addresses the issue, "Heroes of Westerplatte 1939".
