= Wojciech Najsarek =

Polish national (1900 - 1939)

- Born: 22 April 1900; Jaćmierz, Austria-Hungary
- Died: 1 September 1939 (aged 39) Westerplatte, Poland
- Branch: Army of the Second Polish Republic
- Service years: 1920 – 1939
- Rank: Staff Sergeant
- Conflicts: World War 2, Battle of Westerplatte
- Awards: Order of the Virtuti Militari
- Spouse: Maria née Ostrowska

Wojciech Najsarek (22 April 1900 – 1 September 1939) was a Polish soldier and a worker of the Polish State Railways. Chief of the Gdańsk-Westerplatte train station, he was killed during the first minutes of the German attack on the Polish enclave of Westerplatte. He was the first casualty of the Battle of Westerplatte, and one of the first victims of the Invasion of Poland and of World War II.

== Biography ==
Wojciech Najsarek was born 22 April 1900, in Jaćmierz near Sanok, then in Austro-Hungarian Galicia. He graduated from a local primary school. In 1920 he volunteered for the Polish Army and took part in the Polish-Bolshevik War. Following demobilisation he joined the Polish State Railways and at the same time continued his education. In 1926 he married Maria née Ostrowska.

In 1933 he graduated from a gymnasium in Brześć nad Bugiem and was sent for a yearly course for railway managers in Poznań. After that he served as a stationmaster in Reda. On 19 April 1937, he became the stationmaster of Gdańsk-Westerplatte station, a Polish trade outpost within the Free City of Danzig, directly adjacent to a military depot at Westerplatte. At the same time he held a military rank of starszy sierżant (equivalent to the rank of Staff Sergeant).

On 1 September 1939, at 4:50 AM, only five minutes after the outbreak of hostilities, he was alarmed by strange noises and left his outpost to check what was happening, only to find a German military unit heading for the nearby Westerplatte military outpost. He received numerous heavy machine gun wounds and died instantly, as the first Polish victim of the Battle of Westerplatte and one of the first victims of World War II. In 1945 he was posthumously awarded the Virtuti Militari, the highest Polish military decoration. In the 1970s the place of his death was marked with a memorial stone.

In the film Westerplatte, he is played by Józef Lodynski.
