= Gustav Kleikamp =

WW1 & WW2 German Navy admiral (1896-1952)

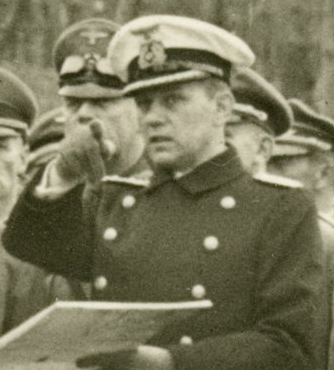
- Born: 8 March 1896; Fiddichow an der Oder
- Died: 13 September 1952 (aged 56); Mülheim an der Ruhr
- Military career
- Branch: Imperial German Navy; Marinebrigade Ehrhardt
- Service years: 1913–1952
- Rank: Vizeadmiral
- Commands: SMS Schleswig-Holstein
- Conflicts: World War I; Raid on Scarborough, Hartlepool and Whitby; Battle of Dogger Bank; World War II; Invasion of Poland; Battle of Westerplatte; Invasion of Denmark; Operation Sea Lion
- Awards: Clasp to the Iron Cross; German Cross in Gold; Hanseatic Cross of Hamburg

Gustav Kleikamp (born 8 March 1896 in Fiddichow an der Oder; died 13 September 1952 in Mülheim an der Ruhr) was a German naval officer, and a Vizeadmiral in Nazi Germany's Kriegsmarine.

== Imperial German Navy ==
On 1 April 1913, Kleikamp entered the Imperial German Navy as a Seekadett on the protected cruiser SMS Vineta. After basic training, he transferred to Marineschule Mürwik on 3 April 1914. After the outbreak of World War I, he was posted as a communications officer to the battlecruiser SMS Derfflinger, where he received promotion to Leutnant zur See in 1915.

From March 1918 he attended Ubootschule and later served as watch officer on SM U-9 until October 1918, when he became clerical officer of the 1. U-Kreuzerflottille until the end of the year.

== Reichsmarine ==
Kleikamp remained with the navy after the collapse of the monarchy in November 1918, serving in the Marine-Brigade Ehrhardt. He received a provisional promotion to Oberleutnant zur See on 7 January 1920, which was confirmed on 14 May 1921.

On 1 October 1920, Kleikamp was posted on Hamburg as communications and watch officer. On 4 December 1921 he was transferred to the pre-dreadnought battleship Braunschweig in the same capacity, where he served until he was given command of the German minesweeper M 113 on 1 October 1922.

After a year as commanding officer, Kleikamp joined the faculty at the Marinenachrichtenschule on 1 October 1923. Having received promotion to Kapitänleutnant in 1925, he joined the battleship Hannover on 24 September 1926 as Rollenoffizier. When Hannover was put out of service, he transferred to Schlesien, the new flagship of Marinestation Nordsee, in the same role.

From 28 September 1928 Kleikamp was the officer responsible for training and education on the cruiser Emden, before being appointed director of the Nachrichtenmittelversuchsanstalt on 11 February 1930. He served in this position until October 1932, when he was appointed naval liaison officer to the Wehrkreiskommando I in Königsberg, having been promoted to Korvettenkapitän. Following the Nazi Party takeover in January 1933, Kleikamp became 4. Admiralstabsoffizier in the Fleet Command.

== Kriegsmarine ==
On 26 September 1935 Kleikamp was made first officer on Schleswig-Holstein, the ship which he would eventually command after a stint as director of the Gruppe Technisches Nachrichtenwesen in the Navy High Command.

On 26 April 1939, having been promoted to Kapitän zur See a year earlier, was given command of Schleswig-Holstein, which had returned from a tour to South America a few weeks earlier. Schleswig-Holstein was slated to be retired and converted into a remotely controlled target ship, but preparations for the Invasion of Poland, saw the ship assigned a war mission.

Late in August 1939, Schleswig-Holstein was sent to Danzig on a friendship visit, in place of the cruiser Königsberg. The visit was a ruse to bring a landing force to Danzig in order to neutralize Polish fortifications in the harbour. For this purpose Schleswig-Holstein had received 60 men with five 2 cm AA guns and six machine guns. While en route, Schleswig-Holstein rendezvoused with the German minesweeper M-1 and other vessels, carrying the 225-men strong Marinestosstruppkompanie from Memel.

== World War II ==
On 1 September 1939 at 04:45, Kleikamp gave the order for the attack on the Westerplatte and two minutes later the first shells left the barrels of Schleswig-Holstein's 28 cm guns.

In April 1940 Schleswig-Holstein was flagship of Kriegsschiffgruppe 7, which was tasked with the occupation of the Danish ports Nyborg and Korsør.

After the Fall of France Kleikamp was appointed Chef der Seebefehlsstelle Calais double-hatting as Chef der Transportflotte C for Operation Sea Lion on 29 August 1940. After the invasion of Britain was cancelled, Kleikamp transferred to Naval High Command as Chef der Militärischen Amtsgruppe in Hauptamt Kriegsschiffbau, a position he held until 21 February 1943.

From March 1943 until the end of 1944, Kleikamp, having been promoted to Konteradmiral and ultimately Vizeadmiral, served as Kommandierender Admiral in den Niederlanden. From 1 January until 14 March 1945, he was at the disposal of the Oberbefehlshaber des Marineoberkommandos Nord. On 15 March 1945 he took over as Kommandierender Admiral Deutsche Bucht.

== Post-War ==
Kleikamp became a Prisoner of War on 7 May 1945 and remained in British custody until 18 April 1947. In poor health, he was unemployed until Spring 1952, when he joined Hugo Stinnes GmbH in Mülheim an der Ruhr. There he died on 13 September 1952.

== Dates of rank ==
- Seekadett – 1 April 1913
- Fähnrich zur See – 3 April 1914
- Leutnant zur See – 18 September 1915
- Oberleutnant zur See – 14 May 1921 (dated 7 January 1920)
- Kapitänleutnant – 1 February 1925
- Korvettenkapitän – 1 October 1932
- Fregattenkapitän – 1 October 1936
- Kapitän zur See – 1 April 1938
- Konteradmiral – 1 April 1942
- Vizeadmiral – 1 October 1943

== Awards and decoration ==
- Iron Cross (1914), 2nd and 1st Class
- Hanseatic Cross of Hamburg
- Honour Cross of the World War 1914/1918
- Clasp to the Iron Cross, 2nd and 1st class
- German Cross in Gold

== Bibliography ==
- Hildebrand, Hans (1989). Deutschlands Admirale: 1849-1945: die militärischen Werdegänge der See-, Ingenieur-, Sanitäts-, Waffen- und Verwaltungsoffiziere im Admiralsrang. Vol. 2. Osnabrück: Biblio. pp. 246–247. ISBN 3764814993.
- Webb, James Jack (2024). Generals and Admirals of the Third Reich: For Country or Fuehrer. Vol. 2: H–O. Havertown, PA: Casemate Publishers. ISBN 978-1-952-71517-4.

Military offices
| Preceded by Kapitän zur See Gustav Kieseritzky | Commanding officer, German battleship Schleswig-Holstein; 26 April 1939 – 28 August 1940 | Succeeded by Korvettenkapitän Guido Zaubzer |
