= Zygmunt Hübner =

Polish actor (1930–1989)

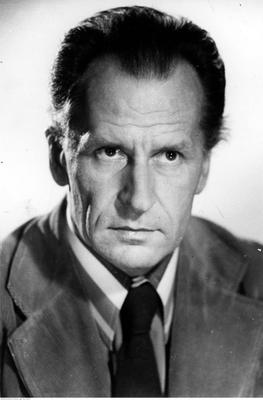
- Born: 23 March 1930; Warsaw, Poland
- Died: 12 January 1989 (aged 58); Warsaw, Poland
- Occupation: Actor
- Years active: 1958-1988

Zygmunt Hübner (23 March 1930 – 12 January 1989) was a Polish actor, stage director, and director of the National Old Theatre in Kraków (1963–69). He appeared in more than 20 films between 1958 and 1988.

== Selected filmography ==
- Samson (1961)
- Westerplatte (1967)
