= Arkadiusz Bazak =

Polish actor

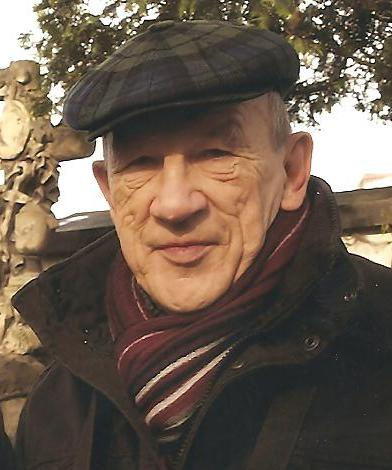
- Born: 12 January 1939 (age 87); Warsaw, Poland
- Occupation: Actor
- Years active: 1964-2009

Arkadiusz Bogusław Bazak (born 12 January 1939) is a Polish actor. He has appeared in more than 40 films and television shows since 1964.

== Selected filmography ==
- Westerplatte (1967)
- Znaki na drodze (1970)
- The Deluge (1974)
- Katastrofa w Gibraltarze (1984)
- Przylbice i kaptury (1985)
