= Mieczysław Słaby =

Major of the Polish Army, physician

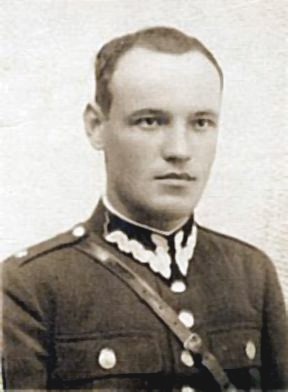
- 2nd Lt. Słaby circa. 1935
- Born: December 9, 1905; Przemyśl, Austria-Hungary
- Died: March 15, 1948 (aged 42); Kraków, Poland
- Burial place: Kraków Military Cemetery
- Military career
- Branch: Army of the 2nd Polish Republic
- Service years: 1935 - 1948
- Rank: Major
- Units: 38th Lwów Rifle Infantry Regiment, 5th Mounted Rifle Regiment
- Conflicts: World War 2, Battle of Westerplatte
- Awards: Order of the Virtuti Militari

Mieczysław Mikołaj Słaby (December 9, 1905, in Przemyśl – March 15, 1948, in Krakow) was a Polish army officer and medic in the Polish Land Forces during the Invasion of Poland, notably during the Battle of Westerplatte. He was posthumously awarded the Order of Virtuti Militari.

== Early life ==
He was one of the children of Józef Słaby, a railway worker, and Agnieszka née Rebizant, along with his brother, Franciszek, who later became an NCO in the Polish Army. After graduating from elementary school, Mieczysław attended the Kazimierz Morawski Gymnasium. During his school years, he was associated with the Polish Scout Association. He was also an active member of the Scout Sports Club until his death. For many years he played with his brother Franciszek in the football team, with which in 1924 he won the ZHP championship. In the years 1920-1921 he was a member of the club's board, and after graduating from the Faculty of Medicine of the Jan Kazimierz University in Lwów in 1933, he became its social doctor.

== Service in the Polish Army and the Battle of Westerplatte ==
In 1935 he was drafted into the army, where he undertook professional service as a doctor, later promoted to the rank of captain. He served in the 38th Infantry Regiment of Lwów Riflemen in Przemyśl and the 5th Regiment of Mounted Riflemen in Dębica, in which he served as a medic. On August 4, 1939, he took up duties on the Military Transit Depot in Westerplatte. The medical equipment he found in it was rudimentary. In addition, the ordered medical equipment (such as an operating table) was requisitioned by the customs authorities of the Free City of Danzig just before the German aggression against Poland. Despite this, he put together a makeshift treatment room and organized a cleaning service. During the battle, he provided effective assistance to the wounded even after the destruction of the treatment room as a result of bombing and the loss of medical supplies. After the surrender of Westerplatte to the Germans, he was placed together with other officers in the Central Hotel in Gdańsk, from where, instead of being transported the Oflag POW Camp, he was brought to Stalag I A, a POW camp intended for non-commissioned officers and enlisted. In the camp, he provided medical assistance to prisoners and civilians deported to do forced labor. After some time, due to a stomach ulcer, he was placed in a prison hospital in Königsberg, where he stayed until the end of the war.

== Later life and death ==
In 1945 he returned to Przemyśl. As an officer, he was immediately mobilized with assignment to the Polish People's Army. A year later, he was promoted to the rank of major. While in the army, he also treated civilian patients, became a doctor at the School of Economics and, in his free time, he helped the medical team at the nearby hospital. On November 1, 1947, he was arrested by the KGB on charges of violating military secrecy and being accused of belonging to the Freedom and Independence Association, a Polish underground military organization. For almost a month, he was detained in Przemyśl, and then secretly deported to Krakow where he was imprisoned in the Montelupich Prison where he was subjected to a brutal investigation and deprived of medical care, despite the advanced condition of his ulcer. After a few weeks in custody, he died on March 15, 1948. He was buried without the knowledge of his family at the Krakow Military Cemetery on Prandoty Street.

== Rehabilitation ==
41 years later, as a result of rehabilitation proceedings conducted by the Supreme Military Prosecutor's Office, Major Słaby was cleared of all charges against him. He was posthumously awarded the Silver Cross of the Order of Virtuti Militari and the Medal "For Participation in the Defensive War of 1939" in 1989.
