= Marinestosstruppkompanie =

Secret Kriegsmarine formation

- Active: 1938–8 May 1945
- Country: Nazi Germany
- Branch: Kriegsmarine
- Type: Marines
- Engagements: Spanish Civil War; World War II

The Marinestosstruppkompanie (MSK) (naval shock troop company) was a marines of the Kriegsmarine formation formed in 1938 in Swinemünde from Marine-Artillerie-Abteilung 123.

In September 1938, a reinforced platoon led by Lt. Walter Schug embarked on the German battleship Deutschland headed for Spain, where it blew up a Republican radio station on the island of Ibiza.

In March 1939, MSK was among German forces occupying Memelland. Under the command of Oblt. Wilhelm Henningsen the MSK trained for future missions.

On 24 August 1939, the 230-men strong MSK embarked on the German minesweeper M-1 in Memel and was transferred to SMS Schleswig-Holstein in preparation for the German invasion of Poland. In the early hours of 1 September 1939, MSK disembarked Schleswig-Holstein in order to attack the Polish military transit depot Westerplatte in Danzig harbour. After the fall of the fortress, MSK was used in the occupation of Gdynia and in the battle of Hel peninsula.

MSK remained active for the rest of World War II, mainly on the Eastern Front.
