= Franciszek Dąbrowski =

Polish military officer (1904–1962)

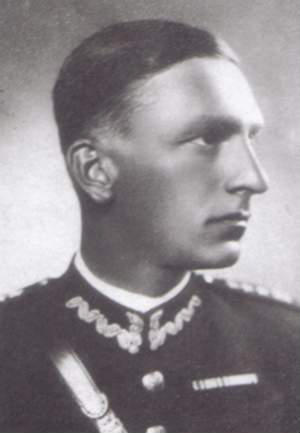
- Born: 17 April 1904; Budapest, Austria-Hungary (now Hungary)
- Died: 24 April 1962 (aged 58); Kraków, Poland
- Military career
- Allegiance: Poland
- Branch: Polish Army; Polish Navy
- Service years: 1923–1950
- Rank: Commander
- Conflicts: World War II; Invasion of Poland; Battle of Westerplatte
- Awards: Order of Virtuti Militari; Gold Cross of Merit; Silver Cross of Merit

Franciszek Dąbrowski (17 April 1904 in Budapest - 24 April 1962 in Kraków) was an officer of the Polish Navy during the Invasion of Poland in 1939.

== Life ==
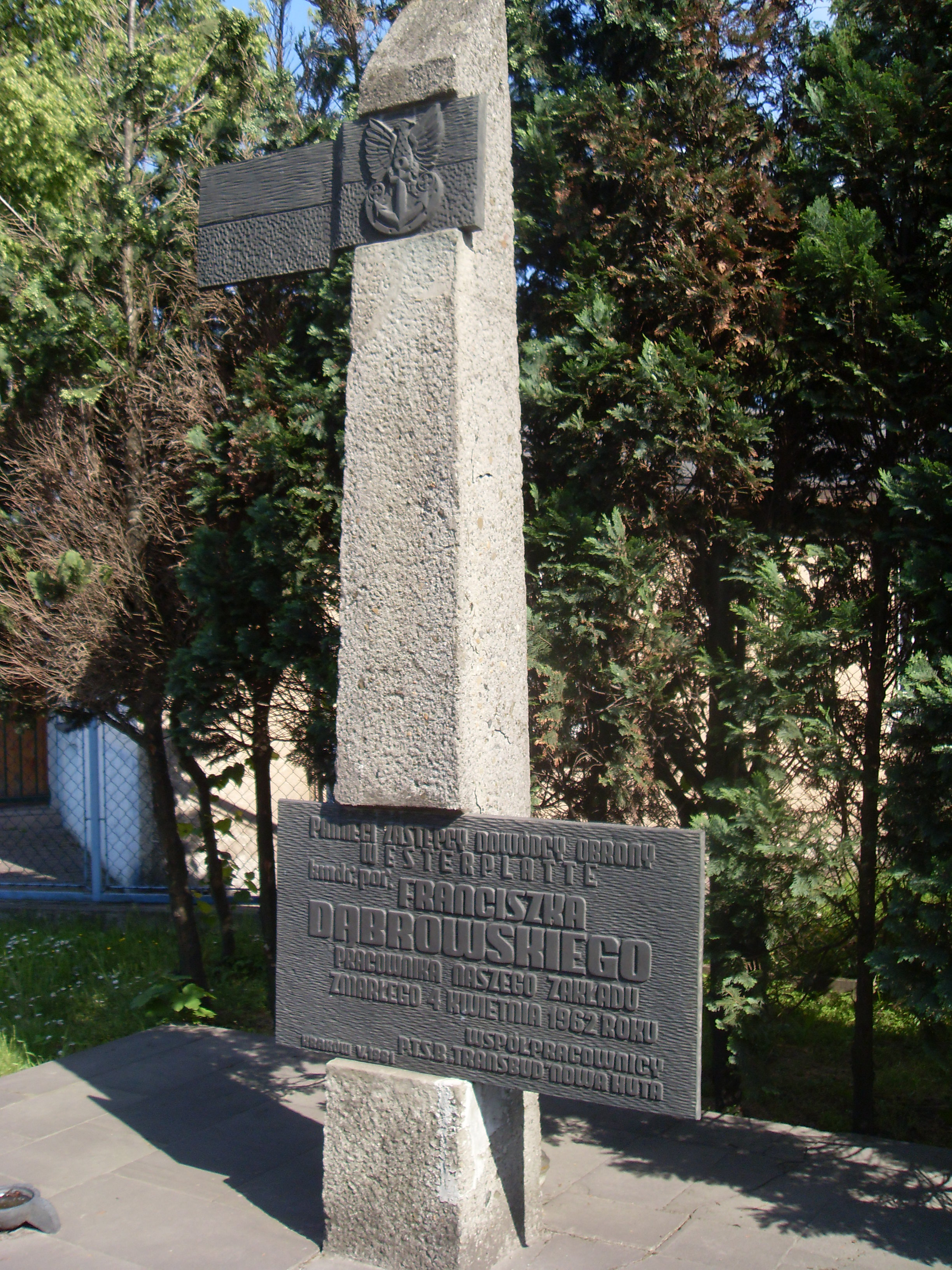
Monument to Franciszek Dąbrowski in Nowa Huta, Kraków

In September 1939, he served at Westerplatte military transit depot, which took part in the Battle of Westerplatte. The Polish garrison fought against overwhelming odds and repulsed all German attacks from 1 to 7 September. After the surrender, he was imprisoned in several German POW camps.

He wrote two books about his experiences during the Battle of Westerplatte: Dziennik Bojowy załogi Westerplatte (1945) and Wspomnienia z obrony Westerplatte (1957). Dąbrowski was awarded the Order of Virtuti Militari V class, the Gold Cross of Merit, the Medal for Odra, Nysa and the Baltic and the Grunwaldzka Badge.

During the postwar years, Melchior Wańkowicz's mythologised account of Henryk Sucharski as a brave commander enduring under hopeless odds became the main source of information on Westerplatte action. The myth was propagated in numerous books and films. It is often thought that the communist authorities preferred to maintain the myth of Sucharski, a heroic son of a peasant and shoemaker, than to support his deputy, Dąbrowski, who was born into a szlachta family. It was not until the 1990s that the truth about Sucharski and Westerplatte started to become more widely known.
