= Henryk Sucharski =

Polish military officer (1898–1946)

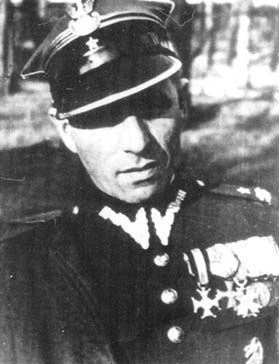
- Born: November 12, 1898; Gręboszów, Austria-Hungary
- Died: August 30, 1946 (aged 47); Naples, Italy
- Burial place: Cemetery of Polish Army Soldiers
- Military career
- Allegiance: Austria-Hungary; Poland
- Service years: 1917–1946
- Rank: Generał brygady
- Commands: Westerplatte
- Conflicts: World War I; Polish-Soviet War; Polish-Lithuanian War; World War II; Polish Defensive War; Battle of Westerplatte
- Awards: Virtuti Militari, Commander Cross of Valour, twice Gold Cross of Merit

Henryk Sucharski (12 November 1898 – 30 August 1946) was a Polish military officer and a major in the Polish Army. At the outbreak of World War II, he was one of the commanders of the Westerplatte position in Gdańsk, which troops under his command defended for seven days against overwhelming odds. Sucharski survived the war.

== Early life and career ==
Sucharski was born on November 12, 1898, in Gręboszów, a village near Tarnów, to a peasant family. He finished a local bi-yearly trade school and then a similar school in Otfinów. In early 1917 he graduated from the 2nd KuK Gymnasium in Tarnów and on February 13 he volunteered for service with the Austro-Hungarian Army. During his service in the March Battalion of the Bochnia-based 32nd Landwehr Regiment, he passed his matura exams and in February 1918 graduated from an officers school in Opatów. Dispatched with his regiment to the Italian front of the Great War, Sucharski was infected with malaria and spent the remainder of the war in various hospitals in San Stino di Livenza and then Celje.

Upon his return to Poland, on February 7, 1919 he joined the Polish Army and the Tarnów-based 16th Infantry Regiment, in part composed of his former Austro-Hungarian unit. In March he took part in the defence of Cieszyn Silesia against the Czechoslovak invasion and in June he was promoted to the rank of Corporal. By the end of October he was transferred to the North-Eastern sector of the front of the brief Polish-Bolshevik War where he took part in fighting along the Lithuanian border during the brief Polish-Lithuanian War for the region around Suwałki. On January 14, 1920 he was promoted to the rank of 2nd Lieutenant and voluntarily joined the storming battalion of the 6th Infantry Division. For his bravery (and wounds) in the battle for Potnica and Bogdanówka on August 30, 1920, Sucharski was awarded the Order of Virtuti Militari, the highest Polish military decoration. He also received the Cross of the Valorous and was promoted to 1st Lieutenant after the war.

In the interbellum Henryk Sucharski remained in active service. He graduated from a variety of courses for various branches of the military and on March 19, 1928 he was promoted to the rank of Captain. An instructor in the Infantry NCO School in Ostrów Mazowiecka, in October 1930 he joined the Brześć nad Bugiem-based 35th Infantry Regiment. After graduating from additional courses at the Centre for Infantry Training in Rembertów near Warsaw, on March 19, 1938 Sucharski was again promoted, this time to the rank of Major.

== Westerplatte ==
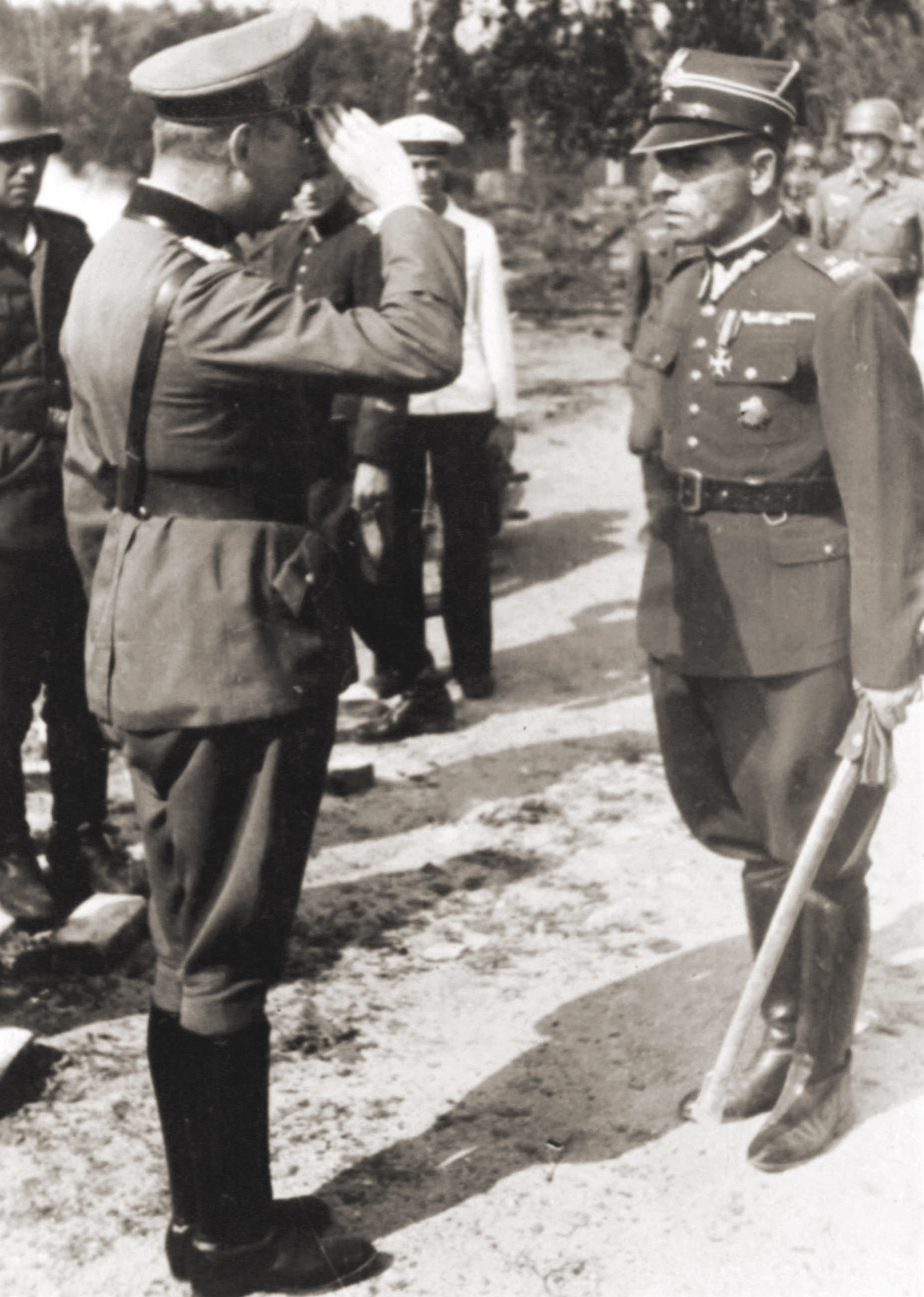
Friedrich-Georg Eberhardt and Henryk Sucharski, Westerplatte, 1939

On December 3, 1938 Sucharski became the commanding officer of the Military Transit Depot in Westerplatte, a Polish military outpost in the Free City of Danzig. A skilled organizer, Sucharski focused on improving the defences of the area under his command, a tiny ex–territorial area within the German-dominated city. He strengthened the fortifications of the Westerplatte peninsula and increased the number of soldiers serving there.

== After Westerplatte ==
After short stays in various German transit camps where the sabre was removed from his possession, on October 26, 1939 Sucharski was imprisoned in Oflag IV-A in the Hohnstein castle. He spent the remainder of the war in various German prisoner of war camps, including Oflag II-B in Arnswalde from June 25, 1940 and Oflag II-D in Gross-Born from May 12, 1942. During the evacuation of Gross-Born in March 1945 he suffered a serious accident from which he never fully recovered.

After being liberated from the Schwerin sub-camp of the Oflag X-C Lübeck by the Americans, on May 28, 1945 Sucharski joined the Polish II Corps and was transferred to Italy, where he briefly served as a commander of the 6th Karpaty Rifles Battalion following January 25, 1946. On August 19, 1946, he was sent to a British military hospital in Naples where he was interviewed by Melchior Wańkowicz, who made Sucharski the main protagonist in his 1948 short story Westerplatte. Henryk Sucharski died from peritonitis several days after the interview, on August 30, 1946. The following day he was buried in the Polish war cemetery in Casamassima near Bari. On September 1, 1971 his ashes were returned to Poland and buried with military honours at Westerplatte, where he was posthumously decorated with the Commanders' Cross of the Virtuti Militari. He was exhumed again in 2022, when his remains were transferred to the new cemetery at Westerplatte.

== Namesake places ==
A street in Gdynia is named for him (located at 54°33'30.99"N and 18°30'24.21"E) and also another in Ostroleka, called Sucharskiego, with seven apartment blocks along it.

== Honours and awards ==
- Commander's Cross of the Virtuti Militari, previously awarded the Silver Cross
- Cross of Valour - twice
- Gold Cross of Merit

== See also ==
- Franciszek Dąbrowski
- Karol Szwedowski
- Polish Military Cemetery at Casamassima
- Westerplatte (movie 1967)

== Notes ==
1. Though Sucharski was posthumously promoted to the rank of Generał brygady, he remains a Major in the popular culture of Poland. In fact he is referred to as Major Sucharski much more often than as Henryk Sucharski.
