= Battle of Westerplatte =

First battle in the Invasion of Poland and beginning of the Second World War

- Part of the Invasion of Poland of World War II
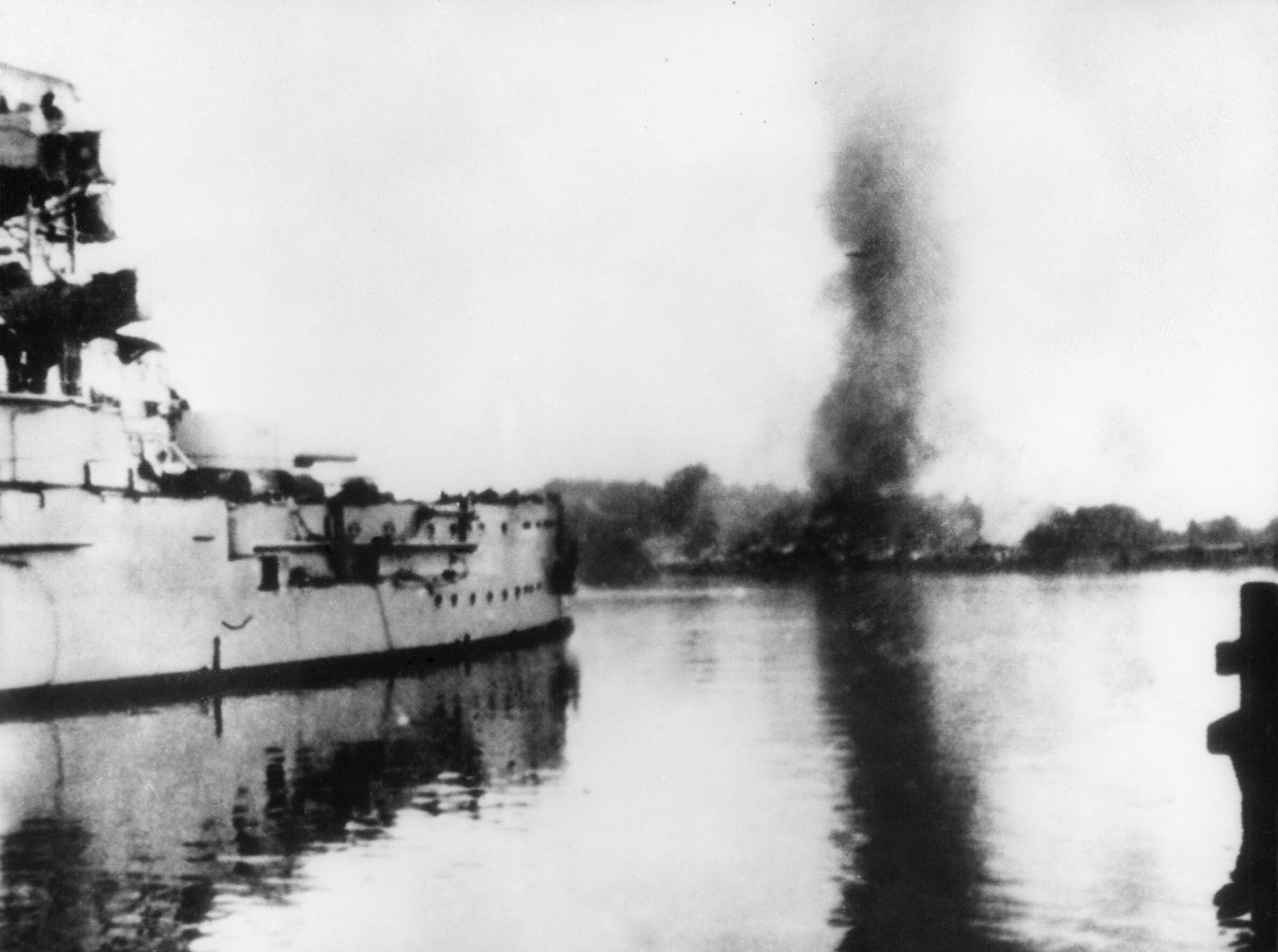
- German battleship Schleswig-Holstein firing her guns on 5 September 1939; taken by the Associated Press
Date	1–7 September 1939 (7 days)
Location	Westerplatte, Free City of Danzig 54°24′27″N 18°40′17″E
Result	German victory

Belligerents
Germany; Free City of Danzig	Poland

Commanders and leaders
F. G. Eberhardt; Gustav Kleikamp; Wilhelm Henningsen †	Henryk Sucharski (surrendered); Franciszek Dąbrowski (surrendered)

Strength
c. 3,400 soldiers 1 battleship 1 torpedo boat 1 minesweeper 60 Junkers Ju 87 dive bombers 1 Howitzer (105 mm); 2 Howitzers (210 mm)	182–240 soldiers 1 Armata 75 mm field gun 2 Bofors 37 mm anti-tank guns 4 81 mm mortars c. 40 machine guns

Casualties and losses
50 killed c. 150 wounded	15 killed 40 wounded 155–185 captured
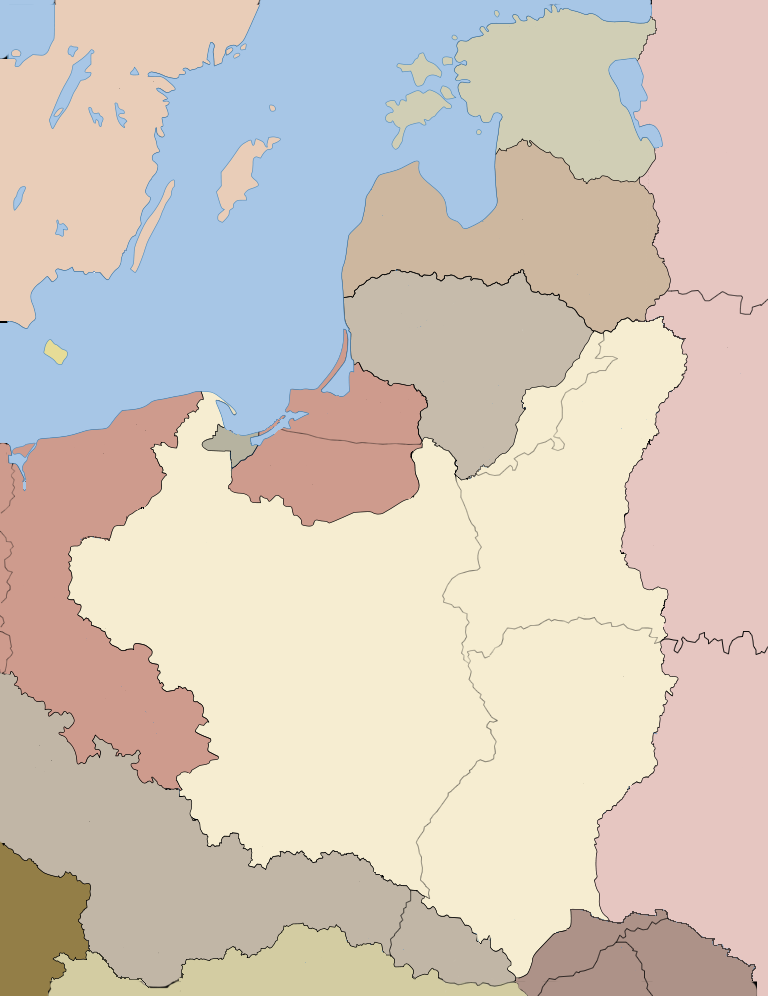
- Location in Poland, 1937 borders

The Battle of Westerplatte was the first battle of the German invasion of Poland, marking the start of World War II in Europe. It occurred on the Westerplatte peninsula in the harbour of the Free City of Danzig (now Gdańsk, Poland). A small forested island separated from Gdansk by the harbour channel, Westerplatte was established as a Polish military outpost during the interwar period.

In the mid-1920s, the Second Polish Republic established the Polish Military Transit Depot (Wojskowa Składnica Tranzytowa, WST) on the Westerplatte peninsula in the Free City of Danzig. Beginning on 1 September 1939, the German Wehrmacht and Danzig Police assaulted the WST. Despite initial assessment on both sides that the Polish garrison might hold out for several hours before being reinforced or overwhelmed, the Poles held out for seven days and repelled thirteen assaults that included dive-bomber attacks and naval shelling.

The defence of the Westerplatte was an inspiration for the Polish Army and people in the face of German advances elsewhere and is still regarded as a symbol of resistance in modern Poland. The Polish government in Gdańsk is planning to open a dedicated public museum on the site in 2026.

== Background ==
Westerplatte is a peninsula in the Bay of Gdańsk, which in 1939 was known as the Bay of Danzig. Following the re-establishment of Polish independence after World War I, much of the surrounding region became part of Poland. The city of Danzig (now Gdańsk, Poland), historically an important port city, became an independent city-state, the Free City of Danzig. The Free City was nominally supervised by the League of Nations but Danzig became increasingly allied with Germany, reflecting its predominantly ethnic German population.

In 1921, in the wake of the Polish-Soviet War, the League of Nations granted Poland the right to install a garrisoned ammunition depot near Danzig. Despite objections from the Free City, this right was confirmed in 1925, and an area of 60 hectares (0.60 km^{2}; 150 acres) was selected on the Westerplatte peninsula. Westerplatte was separated from the New Port of Danzig mainly by the harbour channel; on land, the Polish-held part of Westerplatte was separated from Danzig's territory by a brick wall topped with barbed wire. A dedicated rail line, passing through the Free City, connected the depot with nearby Polish territory. The depot, referred to in League documents as the Depot for Polish Munitions in Transit in the Port of Danzig (WST) (Polish: Wojskowa Składnica Tranzytowa), was completed in November 1925, officially transferred to Poland on the last day of that year, and became operational shortly after in January 1926, with 22 active storage warehouses. The Polish garrison's complement was set at 2 officers, 20 NCOs, privates to a total strength of 88 all ranks, and Poland was prohibited construction of further military installations or fortifications on the site.

By early 1933, German politicians and media figures complained about the need for border adjustments. In addition, the Polish and French governments discussed the need for a preventive war against Germany. On 6 March, in what became known as the "Westerplatte incident" or "crisis", the Polish government landed a marine battalion on Westerplatte, briefly reinforcing the WST garrison to about 200 men, demonstrating Polish resolve to defend the depot; the Polish manoeuvre was also intended to put pressure on the Danzig government, which was trying to renounce a prior agreement on shared Danzig-Polish control over the harbour police and to acquire full control of the police and the harbour. According to one source, on 14 March 1933, the League had authorized Poland to reinforce its garrison. However, according to another, the additional Polish troops were withdrawn on 16 March, following protests from the League, Danzig, and Germany but only in exchange for Danzig's withdrawal of its objections to the harbour-police agreement.

Later, the Poles constructed clandestine fortifications on Westerplatte. These were relatively minor: there were no bunkers or tunnels, only several small guardhouses, partially hidden in the peninsula's forest and several more buildings in the middle of the peninsula, including barracks. Most buildings were constructed with reinforced concrete and were supported by a network of field fortifications, including trenches, barricades and barbed wire.

== Prelude ==
In March 1939, a German ultimatum to Lithuania led to Germany's annexation of the nearby Lithuanian coastal Klaipėda Region; subsequently, the Westerplatte garrison was placed on alert. Fearing a possible Nazi coup d'état in Danzig, the Poles decided secretly to reinforce their garrison and resorted to a subterfuge, civilians in Polish Army uniform would leave the base, and new Polish soldiers would enter it.

By late August 1939, the Poles had reinforced their 88-man garrison, though its strength is still debated; older sources speak of 182 men but more recent research suggests something in the range of 210 to 240, including six officers: Major Henryk Sucharski, his second-in-command Captain Franciszek Dąbrowski, Captain Mieczysław Słaby, Lieutenant Leon Pająk, Lieutenant Stefan Ludwik Grodecki, and Second Lieutenant Zdzisław Kręgielski. Estimates include some 20 mobilized civilians and about 10 regular troops who happened to be on site when fighting began. In addition to light arms consisting of pistols, grenades, and about 160 rifles, weaponry included a 75 mm field gun wz. 1902/26, two Bofors 37 mm anti-tank guns, four 81 mm mortars, and about 40 machine guns, including 18 heavy machine guns. Field fortifications were extended: more trenches were dug, wooden barricades were built, barbed wire was strung into wire obstacles, and reinforced concrete shelters were built into the basements of the barracks. Foliage was thinned to reduce cover on expected avenues of attack.

The Polish defence, which anticipated principally a German land-based assault, rested on three lines of defence. The outer line included entrenched outposts (codenamed Prom, Przystań, Łazienki and Wał) which were to hold long enough for the garrison to mobilize. The second line of defence centred on five guardhouses (numbered I to V) in the center of the depot. The final defence comprised the headquarters and barracks at the depot's centre (sometimes referred to as Guardhouse VI). The Poles also had several supporting positions (Elektrownia, Deika, Fort, Tor kolejowy and Kej). The plan called for the garrison to hold out for 12 hours, after which the siege was expected to be lifted by reinforcements arriving from the mainland.

On 25 August 1939, the German pre-dreadnought battleship Schleswig-Holstein, under the pretext of making a courtesy call, sailed into Danzig harbour, anchoring 150 metres (160 yd) from Westerplatte. On board was a Marinestosstruppkompanie (marine shock-troop company) of 225 marines under Lieutenant Wilhelm Henningsen. On land the Germans had the SS Heimwehr Danzig force of 1,500 men under Police General Friedrich-Georg Eberhardt. In overall command was Captain Gustav Kleikamp, aboard Schleswig-Holstein. Initially, the marines were ordered to attack on the morning of 26 August 1939, on that day Kleikamp moved the battleship farther upstream, and as a result, Sucharski put his garrison on heightened alert. Shortly before the German disembarkation, the orders were rescinded as Adolf Hitler had postponed hostilities on learning of the Polish-British Common Defence Pact, signed the day before, on 25 August 1939, and that Italy was hesitant about its obligations under the Pact of Steel.

Neither Eberhardt nor Kleikamp had specific information on the Polish defences. The Germans assumed that preliminary bombardment would soften up the fortifications enough for the marines to capture Westerplatte. Kleikamp had been assured by the Danzig Police that "Westerplatte would be taken in 10 minutes." Eberhardt himself was more cautious, estimating that "a few hours" would be needed to overcome the Polish garrison, which the Germans estimated at no more than 100 men. The battle was fought at the semi - fortified supply depot on the Westerplatte peninsula at the mouth of the Vistula river north of Danzig (Gdansk).

== Battle ==
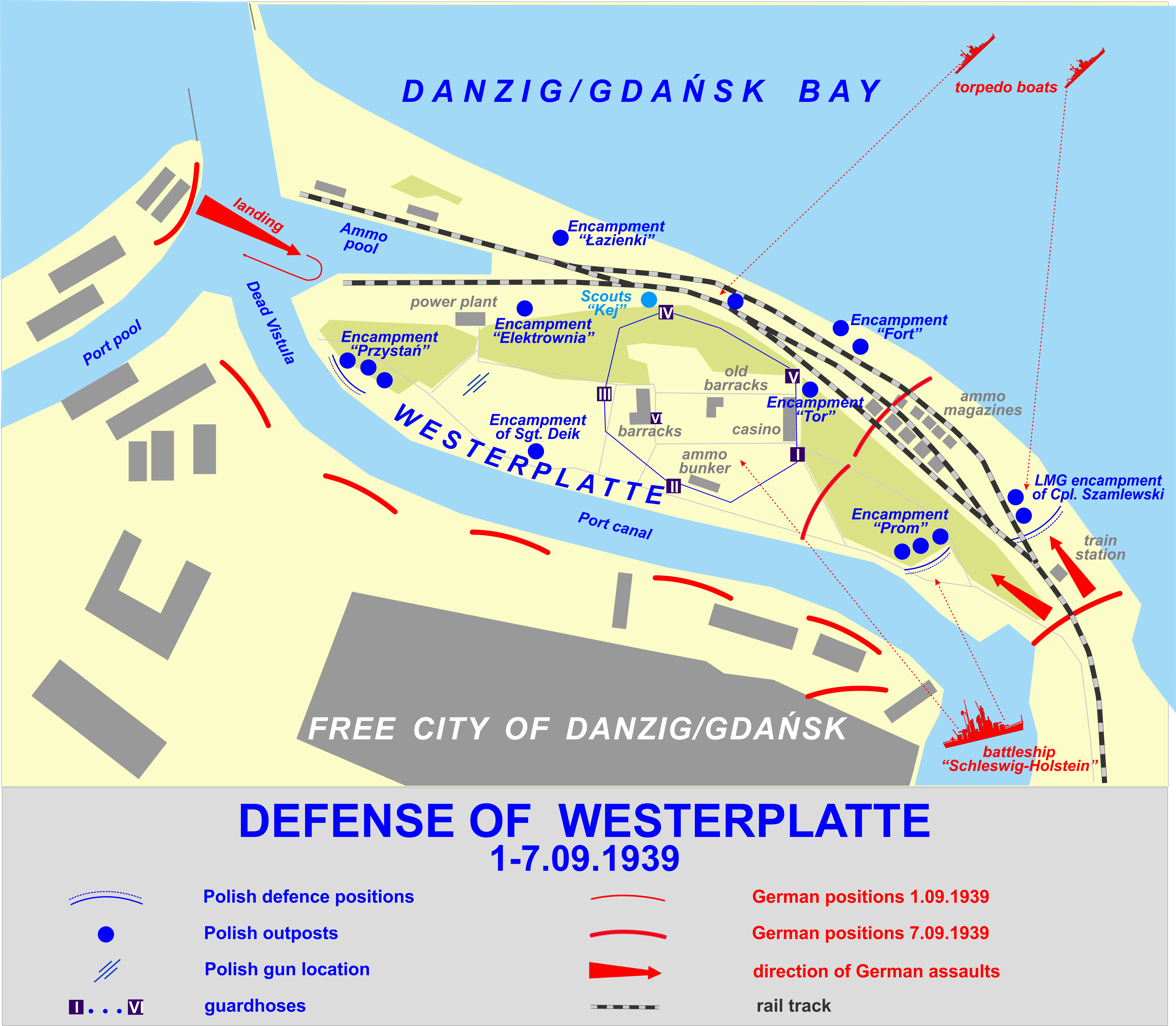
Map of the battle

On the early morning of 1 September 1939, Schleswig-Holstein fired a broadside at the Polish garrison. That salvo's time has been variously stated as 04:43 04:45, 04:47, or 04:48. Polish historian Jarosław Tuliszka explains that 04:45 was the planned time, 04:47 was the time the order was given by Kleikamp and 04:48 was the time the guns actually fired. Shortly after, on Westerplatte, Sucharski radioed the nearby Polish military base on the Hel Peninsula, "SOS: I'm under fire." Other sources indicate the shot was fired at 04:00 rather than at or around 04:45. The battleship's initial bombardment was not very successful, failing to inflict a single casualty among the defenders, as due to the battleship's proximity to its target its heavier shells did not have time to arm and did not explode upon impact.

Eight minutes later Henningsen's marines from the Schleswig-Holstein, who had disembarked two hours earlier on the eastern side of the peninsula, advanced, expecting an easy victory over the Poles. However, after crossing the artillery-breached brick wall at the border, advancing about 200 metres (220 yd), and engaging the Polish Prom outpost, the Germans ran into an ambush. They found themselves in a kill zone of Polish crossfire from concealed firing positions, while barbed-wire entanglements impeded their movements. Around 05:15, the field gun, commanded by Pająk, opened intense fire on the advancing Germans, firing 28 rounds and knocking out several machine-gun nests atop warehouses across the harbour canal. Meanwhile, the German infantry was also shelled by the Polish mortars, and even the battleship itself was targeted by the Polish 37 mm guns. Around that time, the Poles also repulsed an attempt by a small maritime unit of the Danzig Police to land on the western side of the depot. In that initial engagement, Poles sustained two casualties, and a Polish soldier, Staff Sergeant Wojciech Najsarek, was killed by machine-gun fire. Najsarek has been described as the first Polish combat casualty of the battle and perhaps of the war.

At 06:22, the German marines frantically radioed the battleship that they had sustained heavy losses and were withdrawing. Casualties were approximately fifty Germans and eight Poles, mostly wounded. A longer bombardment from the battleship, lasting from 07:40 to 08:55, preceded a second attack and succeeded at knocking out the Polish field gun. The Germans assaulted again from 08:35 to 12:30 but encountered mines, felled trees, barbed wire and intense fire. By noon, when the Germans retreated, Henningsen had been gravely wounded. Eberhardt requested air support, but it was delayed due to bad weather over Westerplatte. On that first day's combat, the Polish side had sustained four killed and several wounded. The German marines had lost sixteen killed and a hundred and twenty wounded.

The German commanders concluded that a ground attack was not feasible until the Polish defences had been softened up. Re-examining aerial photographs, where they had previously underestimated the Polish defences, they now overestimated them, concluding the Poles had constructed extensive underground and armoured fortifications (six haystacks were declared to be armoured bunker domes). In the following days, the Germans bombarded the Westerplatte peninsula with naval and heavy field artillery, including a 105 mm howitzer battery and 210 mm howitzers. On 2 September, from 18:05 to 18:25, a two-wave air raid by 60 Junkers Ju 87 Stuka dive bombers dropped 26.5 tonnes (58,000 lb) of bombs, eliminating the Polish mortars, destroying Guardhouse V with a 500 kilograms (1,100 lb) bomb and killing at least eight Polish soldiers. The air raid shrouded all of Westerplatte in clouds of smoke and destroyed the Poles' only radio and much of their food supply. According to some German sources, after the air raid the Poles briefly displayed a white flag; but not all historians are convinced of this, and the German observers may have been mistaken.

On 4 September, a German torpedo boat, T196, supported by an old minesweeper, the Von der Groben, made a surprise attack. The Poles' Wał outpost had been abandoned. Now only the Fort outpost prevented an attack from the north. Though the Poles never landed a hit on the German naval units, T196 and Schleswig-Holstein suffered accidents due to crew error or equipment failure, with at least one fatality and several injured men on the battleship.

On 5 September, Sucharski held a conference with his officers, during which he urged surrender: the post had only been supposed to hold out for twelve hours. His deputy, Dąbrowski, opposed surrender and the group decided to hold out a while longer.

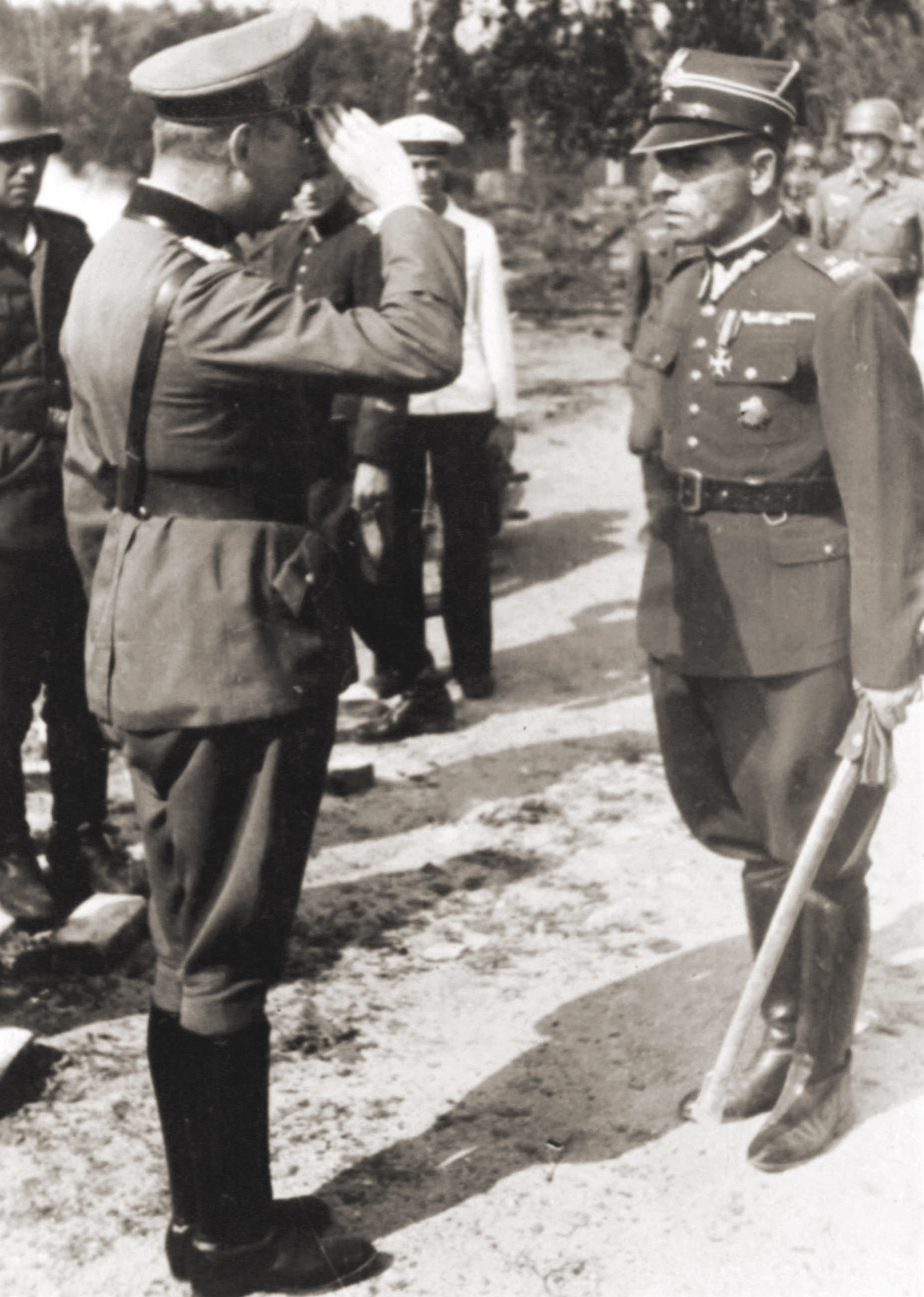
Major Sucharski (right) surrenders Westerplatte to General Friedrich-Georg Eberhardt, 7 September 1939

Subsequently, the Poles repelled several cautious German probing attacks. At 03:00 on 6 September, during one of the attacks, the Germans sent a burning train toward the Polish positions, but the ploy failed when the terrified driver decoupled prematurely. The train failed to reach its target, an oil cistern; instead, it set fire to the woods, which had provided the Poles with valuable cover. In addition, the burning wagons created a perfect field of fire; the Germans suffered heavy losses. A second fire-train attack, in the afternoon, also failed.

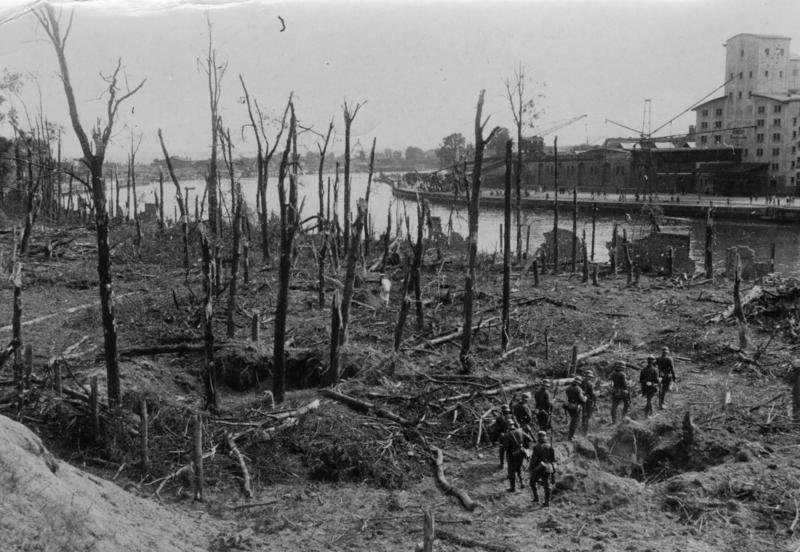
German soldiers on Westerplatte, 8 September, after the battle

At a second conference with his officers, on 6 September, Sucharski was again ready to surrender: the German Army was by now outside Warsaw, and Westerplatte was running critically low on supplies; moreover, many of the wounded were suffering from gangrene. At 04:30 on 7 September, the Germans opened intense fire on Westerplatte which lasted till 07:00. Flamethrowers and bombardment destroyed Guardhouse II and damaged Guardhouses I and IV. Schleswig-Holstein took part in the bombardments.

At 09:45 on 7 September 1939, a white flag appeared. The Polish defence had so impressed the Germans that their commander, Eberhardt, initially let Sucharski keep his ceremonial szabla (Polish saber) in captivity although it would be confiscated later. Contemporary English-language publications which reported on the event, such as Life and the Pictorial History of the War, misidentified the Polish commander as a Major "Koscianski".

Sucharski surrendered the post to Kleikamp, and the Germans stood at attention as the Polish garrison marched out at 11:30. Over 3,000 Germans, including soldiers and support formations such as the Danzig Police, had been tied up in the week-long operation against the small Polish garrison; about half of the Germans (570 on land, over 900 at sea) had taken part in direct action. German casualties totalled 50 killed (16 from the Kriegsmarine) and 150 wounded. The Poles had lost 15 men and had sustained at least 40 wounded.

== Aftermath ==
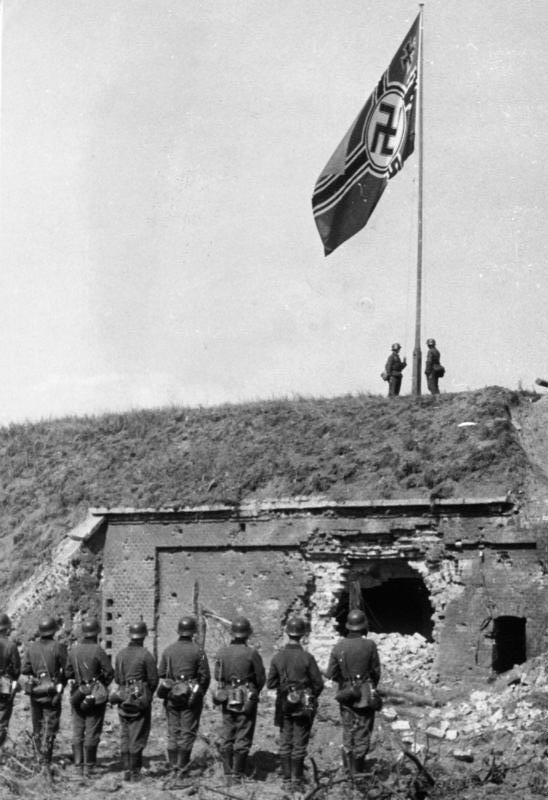
German war flag being raised on Westerplatte, 8 September 1939

On 8 September, the day after the capitulation, the Germans discovered a grave with the bodies of four unidentified Polish soldiers who had been executed by their comrades for attempted desertion. According to Tomasz Sudoł this had likely taken place following the 2 September air raids. Five days after the capitulation, on 12 September 1939, the Polish wireless operator, Sergeant Kazimierz Rasiński, was murdered by the Germans. He was shot after brutal interrogation during which he refused to hand over radio codes. On 19 September Hitler came to visit Danzig. While there, on 21 September, he inspected Westerplatte.

Westerplatte saw another round of fighting during the Vistula–Oder Offensive in 1945. From 28 March to 1 April, elements of the German 73rd Infantry Division defended the peninsula from the Soviet 76th Guards Rifle Division until the German units were evacuated by sea.

== Significance ==
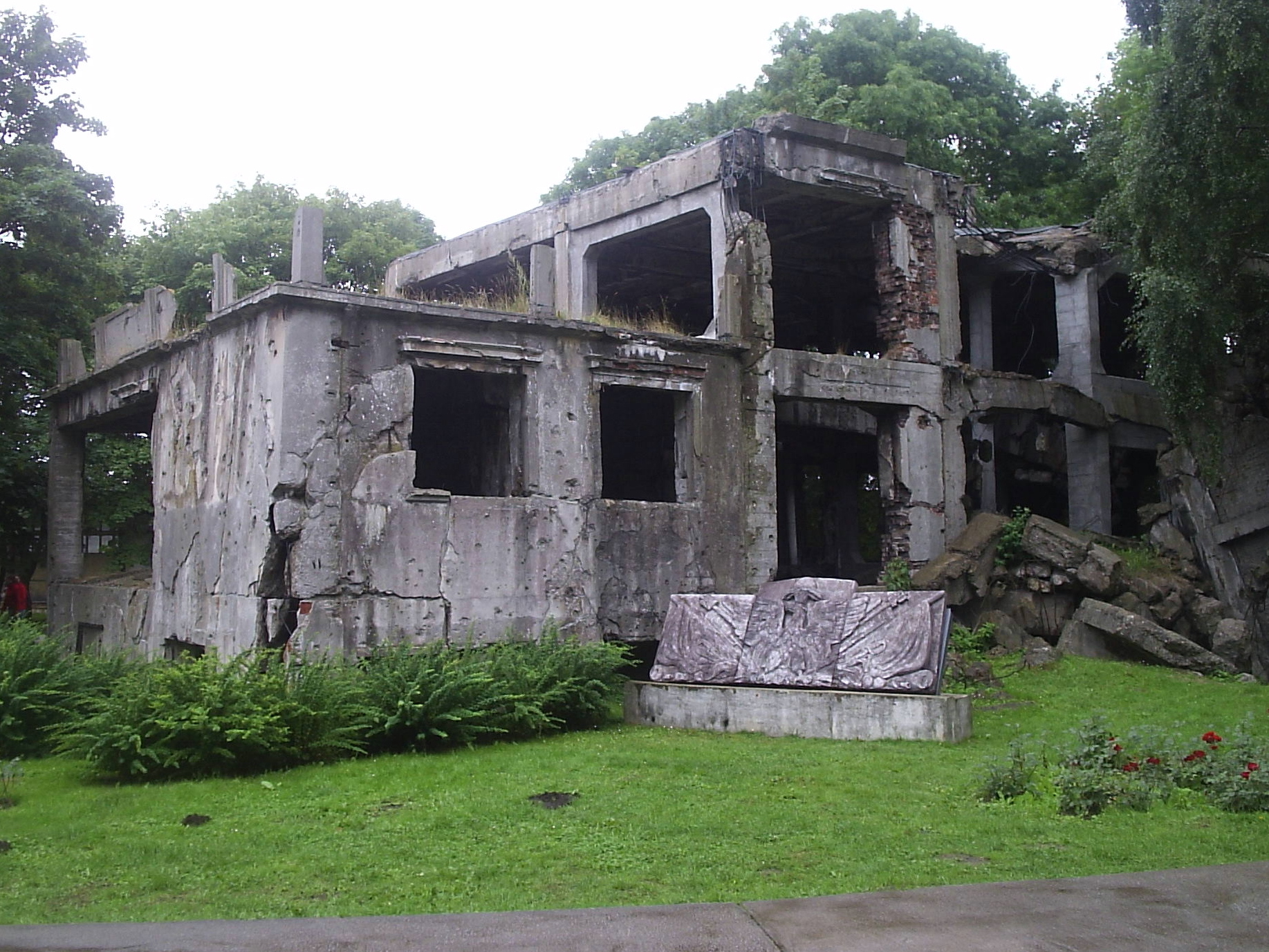
Ruins of Westerplatte barracks, 2005

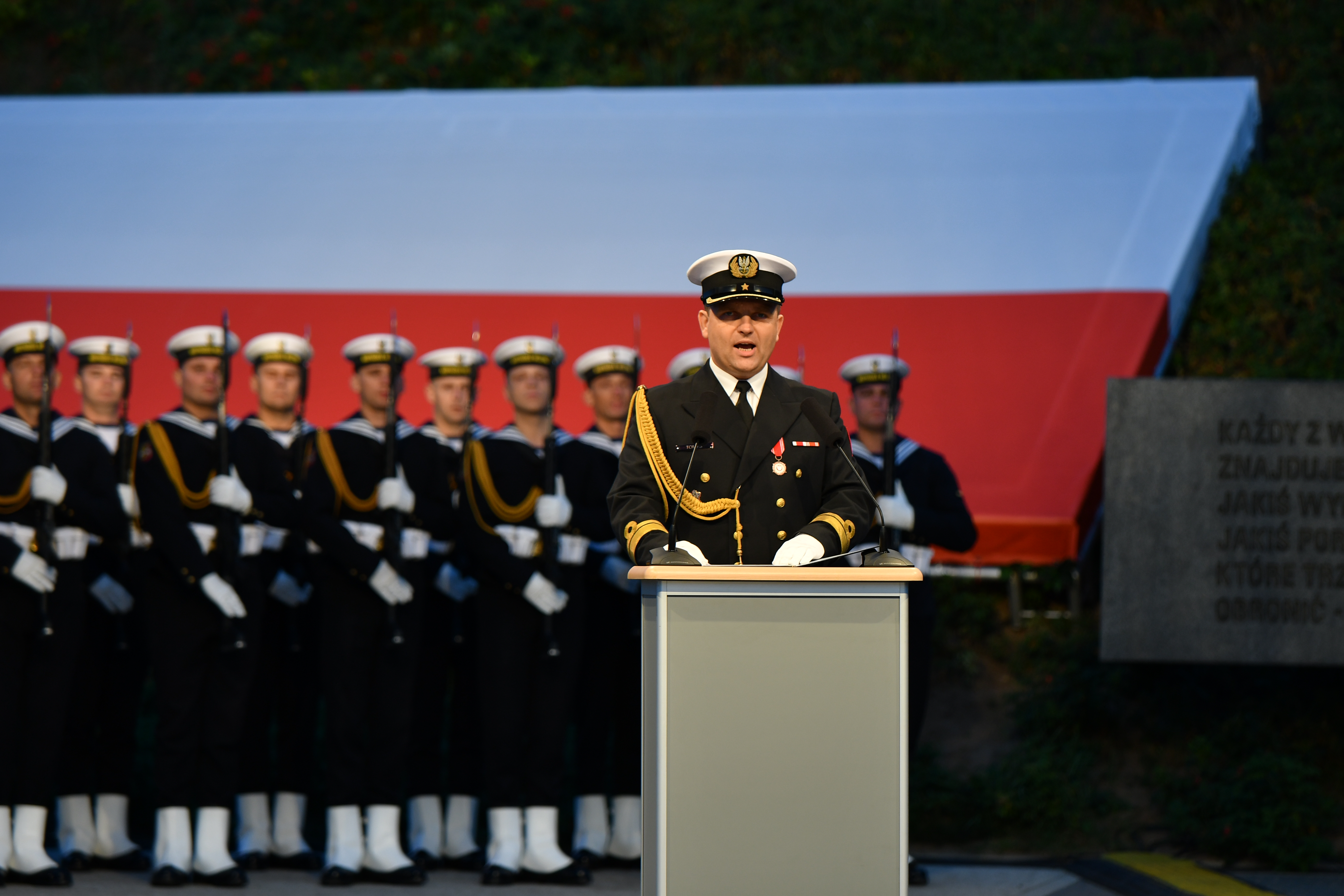
A Polish naval officer delivering an address during the 79th anniversary of the Battle of Westerplatte in 2018.

The Battle of Westerplatte is often described as the opening battle of World War II, but it was only one of many battles in the first phase of the German invasion of Poland known as the Battle of the Border. British historian I. C. B. Dear described the Schleswig-Holstein's salvos as having occurred "minutes after Luftwaffe attacks on Polish airfields" and other targets. A bridge in nearby Tczew had been bombed around 04:30, and the false-flag Operation Himmler had begun hours earlier.

The Polish historian Krzysztof Komorowski writes that "Westerplatte has become one of the symbols of the Polish struggle for independence, and is inscribed in the list of the most heroic battles of modern Europe."

For both sides, the battle had mostly political, rather than tactical, importance. It tied up substantial German forces for much longer than anyone had expected, preventing Schleswig-Holstein from lending fire support in the nearby battles of Hel and Gdynia.

Westerplatte's defence inspired the Polish Army and people even as German advances continued elsewhere; beginning on 1 September 1939, Polish Radio repeatedly broadcast the phrase that made Westerplatte an important symbol: "Westerplatte broni się jeszcze" ("Westerplatte fights on"). On 16 September Konstanty Ildefons Gałczyński penned a poem, Song about the Soldiers of Westerplatte, voicing a subsequent myth that all of Westerplatte's defenders had died in the battle, fighting to the last man. The battle became a symbol of resistance to the invasion – a Polish Battle of Thermopylae. As early as 1943, a Polish People's Army unit was named for Westerplatte's soldiers (the Polish 1st Armoured Brigade of the Defenders of Westerplatte). That same year, the Polish Underground State named a street after Westerplatte; and the following year, during the 1944 Warsaw Uprising, an insurgent stronghold was named Westerplatte.

== Controversy ==
Controversy surrounds the Polish garrison's commanding officer, Sucharski. Early historiography considered him to have been in command throughout the battle, and so early accounts portrayed him as a heroic figure. More recent accounts from the early 1990s have presented evidence that Sucharski's officers had vowed not to disclose in their lifetimes that their commander had been shell-shocked for most of the battle and had advocated surrender as early as 2 September and several times thereafter and that his second-in-command, Dąbrowski, had effectively taken command following Sucharski's breakdown on the second day of the siege.

Sucharski's conduct is still debated by historians.

== Remembrance ==
Westerplatte is a common venue for state remembrance ceremonies relating to World War II, usually held on 1 September. They are generally attended by high-ranking Polish politicians such as Prime Minister Donald Tusk (2014), President Bronisław Komorowski (2015), President Andrzej Duda (2016), and Prime Minister Beata Szydło (2017). The commemoration of the 70th anniversary of the outbreak of World War II, in 2009, was attended by Tusk, former Prime Minister Tadeusz Mazowiecki, and former Presidents Lech Wałęsa and Aleksander Kwaśniewski, as well as by important figures from about 20 other countries, including German Chancellor Angela Merkel, Russian Prime Minister Vladimir Putin, Ukrainian Prime Minister Yulia Tymoshenko, and French Prime Minister François Fillon.

The Battle of Westerplatte has been the subject of two Polish films: Westerplatte (1967), and Tajemnica Westerplatte (The Secret of Westerplatte, 2013). It has also inspired dozens of books and scores of press articles, scholarly studies, and fictional works, as well as poems, songs, paintings, and other works of art.

=== Tourist attraction ===
The Polish 75 mm field gun became one of Germany's first war trophies of World War II, displayed on a column at Flensburg. After the war, it was moved to stand before the Naval Academy Mürwik.

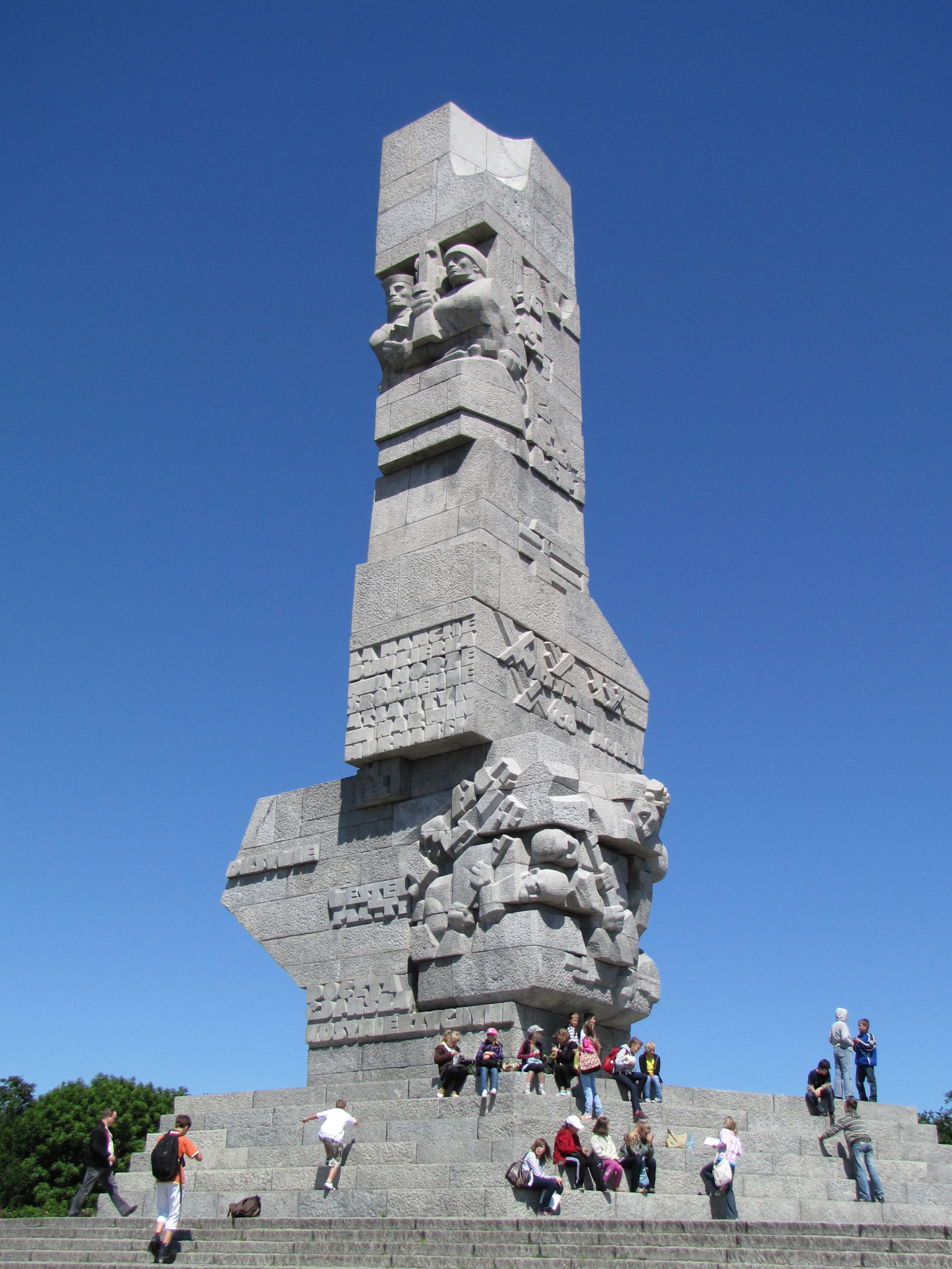
Westerplatte Monument, an obelisk also known as the "Monument to the Defenders of the Coast" or "Historical Monument, Site of the Battle of Westerplatte".

Westerplatte's Guardhouses I, III and IV, the power plant, and the barracks survived the war. In 1946, a Cemetery of the Fallen Defenders of Westerplatte and a Tomb of the Unknown Soldier were established on the peninsula; the cemetery was placed near the destroyed Guardhouse V. During the early postwar Stalinist era, Westerplatte was presented as a symbol of Poland's prewar anticommunist government and was marginalised in official history; Mieczysław Słaby, the garrison surgeon at Westerplatte, was arrested, tortured and died in the custody of the Ministry of Public Security in 1948. After the mid-1950s liberalization, Westerplatte was repurposed as a communist propaganda symbol; in 1956, the Polish Naval Academy was named for the "Heroes of Westerplatte", and that name began to be given to schools, streets, and other institutions. In 1962 a Christian cross at the cemetery was replaced with a Soviet T-34 tank, and the first government-organized remembrances began at Westerplatte. In 1966, a Westerplatte Monument, a 25 metres (27 yd)-tall obelisk atop a mound, was erected at Westerplatte, set within a park, with smaller installations. Westerplatte became a popular tourist attraction. Later, Guardhouse I was relocated in order to save it from destruction during the construction of a new harbour channel. In 1971, Sucharski's grave was relocated to Westerplatte from his original burial place in Italy. In 1974, a small museum was opened in the renovated Guardhouse I. Since the 1980s, Westerplatte has been administered by the National Museum in Gdańsk. In 1981, the cross was restored to the cemetery. In June 1987, Westerplatte was visited by Pope John Paul II; his visit is commemorated by a plaque unveiled in 2015.

Following the fall of communism in Eastern and Central Europe, a change symbolic of Poland's political transformation was the 2007 transfer of the Soviet T-34 tank from the cemetery to a museum in another town. In 2001, the Polish government recognised Westerplatte's ruins as an object of cultural heritage. On 1 September 2003, the site was designated an official Historic Monument. In the mid-2010s, the Polish government decided to create a dedicated Westerplatte Museum, commemorating the 1939 battle; as of 2019, the museum was planned to be opened in 2026.

== See also ==
- Bombing of Wieluń
- Defence of the Polish Post Office in Danzig
- 2022 Snake island campaign
- Fortifications of Westerplatte
