= Westerplatte =

Peninsula in the harbour channel of Gdańsk, Poland

Coordinates: 54°24′27″N 18°40′17″E

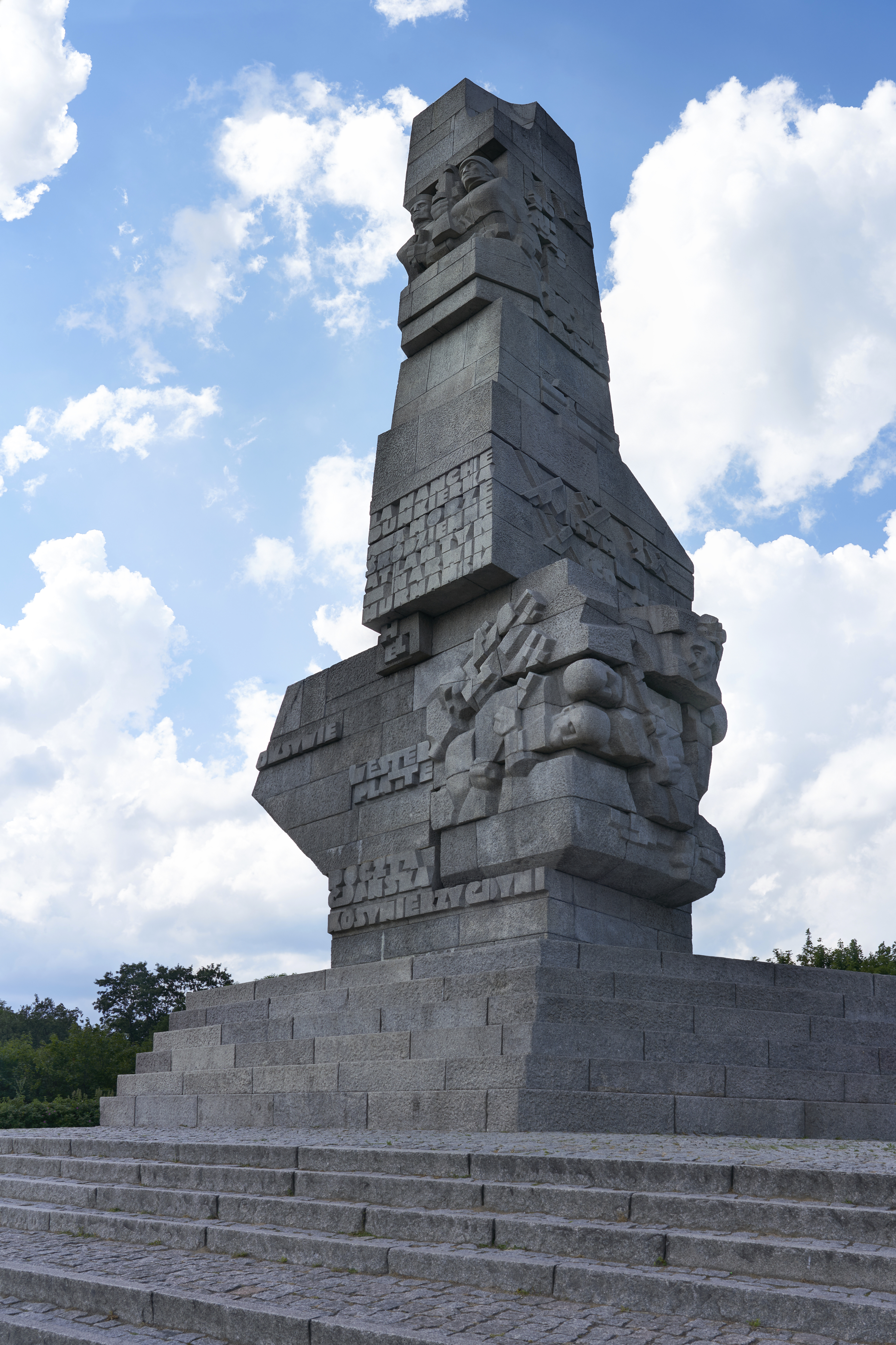
Westerplatte Monument in memory of the Polish defenders

Westerplatte (Polish pronunciation: [vɛstɛrˈplatɛ], [ˈvɛstɛrplatɛ], German pronunciation: [ˈvɛstɐplatə]) is a peninsula in Gdańsk, Poland, located on the Baltic Sea coast mouth of the Dead Vistula (one of the Vistula delta estuaries), in the Gdańsk harbour channel. From 1926 to 1939, it was the location of a Polish Military Transit Depot (WST), sanctioned within the territory of the Free City of Danzig (now Gdańsk).

The first shots of the Second World War were fired at the Battle of Westerplatte which began at 04:50 AM on the 1 September, 1939. The fighting started when the German WWI battleship SMS Schleswig-Holstein began shelling the Polish ammunition depot on Westerplatte. After a siege that lasted a week, the Polish garrison surrendered to German forces that were part of invasion of Poland.

== History ==
=== Resort ===
The resort was established on the Westerplatte peninsula around 1830 which had a beach, a forested park, a seaside bath complex and health spa facilities.

=== Transit depot ===
Following the reestablishment of Polish independence in the aftermath of World War I, much of the surrounding region became a part of the Second Polish Republic. The city of Danzig (present day Gdańsk), a historically important port city, at that time predominantly ethnically German, became an independent city state, the Free City of Danzig. The Free City was nominally run by the League of Nations, but over time became increasingly allied with Germany.

In 1921, the League of Nations granted Poland the right to install an ammunition depot near Gdańsk, and station a garrison there. Despite some objections from the Free City, this right was confirmed in 1925, where the location was agreed on with the choice of Westerplatte. Westerplatte was primarily separated from the New Port of the Free City of Danzig by the harbour channel, with only a small pier connecting them to the mainland; the Polish-held part of the Westerplatte was separated from the territory of Danzig by a brick wall. The depot was completed in November 1925 and became operational in January 1926. The Polish garrison's size was set at 88 soldiers, and Poland was not allowed to construct fortifications.

On 6 March 1933, in what became known as the westernmost incident (or crisis), the Polish government landed a marine battalion, briefly strengthening the outpost to about 200 men. This was done to demonstrate the Polish resolve to defend the outpost in response to recent comments by German politicians and media figures about the need of border adjustment and Poland and France were secretly discussing preventive war against Germany; on a local level this was also done to put pressure on the Danzig government which was trying to renounce prior agreement on shared Danzig-Polish control over harbor police and take sole control of that unit. Polish troops were withdrawn by 16 March, after protests from the League, Danzig and Germany, in exchange for Danzig withdrawing its objections to the harbor police agreement. According to another source, on 14 March 1933 the League did authorize Poland to strengthen the garrison.

Over the years, the Poles also constructed clandestine fortifications. These were not very impressive: there were no real bunkers or tunnels, but only five small concrete outposts (guardhouses) hidden in the peninsula's forest and a large barracks prepared for defence, supported by a network of field fortifications such as trenches and barricades. Several of the buildings were reinforced with concrete. With tensions rising, in early 1939, the garrison was placed on alert.

=== Battle of Westerplatte ===
On 1 September 1939, only minutes after the German Luftwaffe (air force) had begun the invasion of Poland by dropping bombs in a series of raids on the city of Wieluń by Junkers Ju 87 Stukas, at 04:48 local time, the battleship Schleswig-Holstein, then on a courtesy visit to the Free City of Danzig, without warning opened fire on the Polish garrison. This was followed by an attack by Oblt. Wilhelm Henningsen’s storm unit from the Schleswig-Holstein and the Marinestosstruppkompanie. Soon after crossing the artillery-breached brick wall, the attackers were ambushed by the Polish defenders, with small arms, mortar and machine-gun fire from concealed and well-positioned firing points that caught them in a crossfire. Another two assaults that day were repelled as well, with the Germans suffering unexpectedly high losses.

Over the coming days, the Germans repeatedly bombarded Westerplatte with naval artillery and heavy field artillery along with dive-bombing raids by Stukas. Repeated attacks by 570 German soldiers were repelled by the 180 Polish soldiers for seven days. Major Henryk Sucharski had been informed that no help from the Polish Army would come. Cut off, with no reinforcements or chance of resupply, he continued his defence, keeping the main German force stalled at Westerplatte and so preventing further attacks along the Polish coast.

On 7 September, the Major decided to surrender, due to lack of ammunition and supplies. As a sign of honour for the soldiers of Westerplatte, the German commander, Gen. Eberhardt, allowed Major Sucharski to keep his sword while being taken prisoner.

=== Post-war ===
The ruins of the defenders' barracks and guardhouses are still there. After the war, one of the guardhouses (#1) was converted into a museum. Two 280mm shells from the Schleswig-Holstein prop up its entrance.

A Monument of the Coast Defenders (Pomnik Obrońców Wybrzeża) was unveiled in 1966.

Westerplatte Museum dedicated to the 1939 battle was created in 2015.

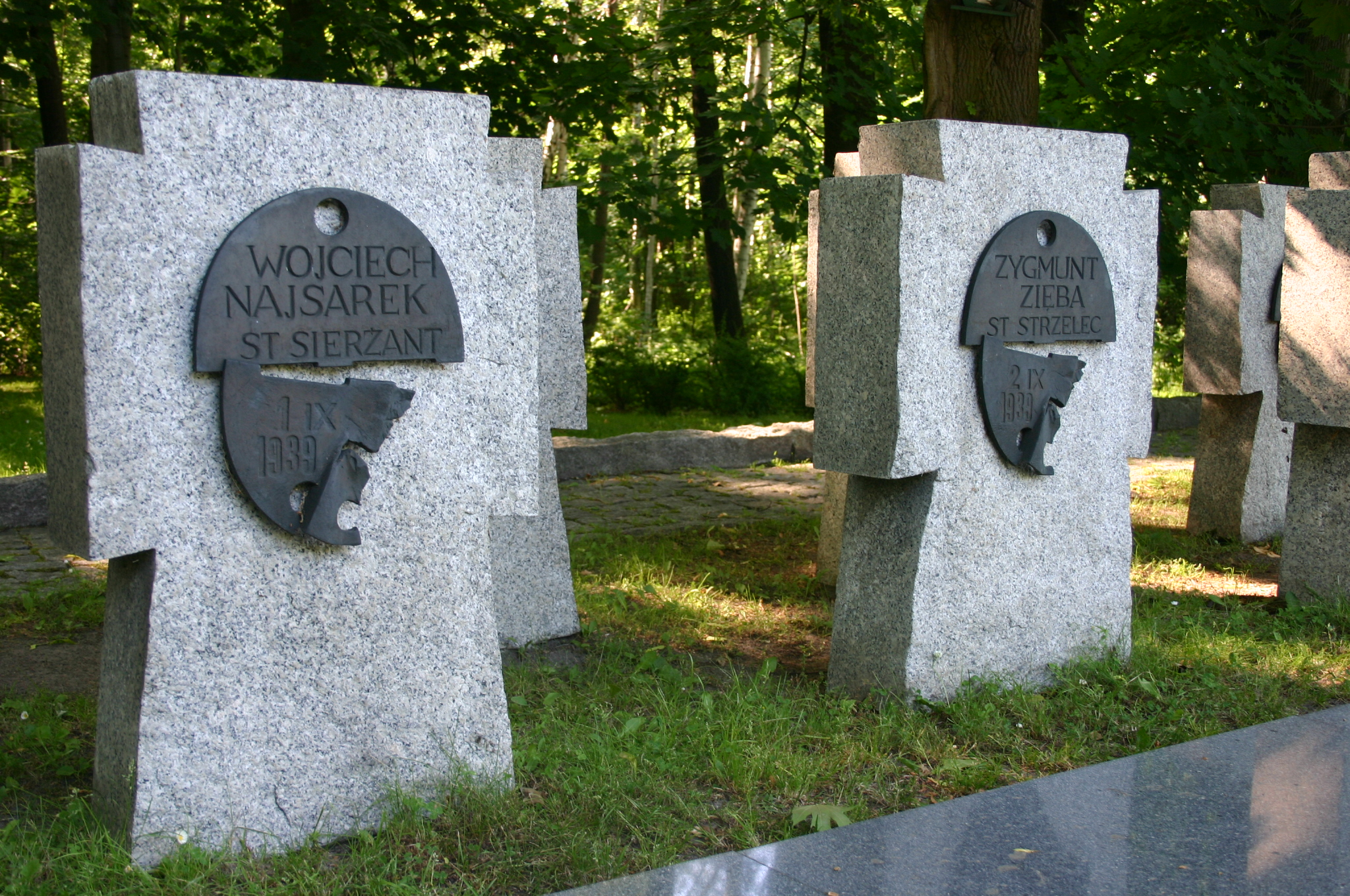
Memorials to fallen soldiers.

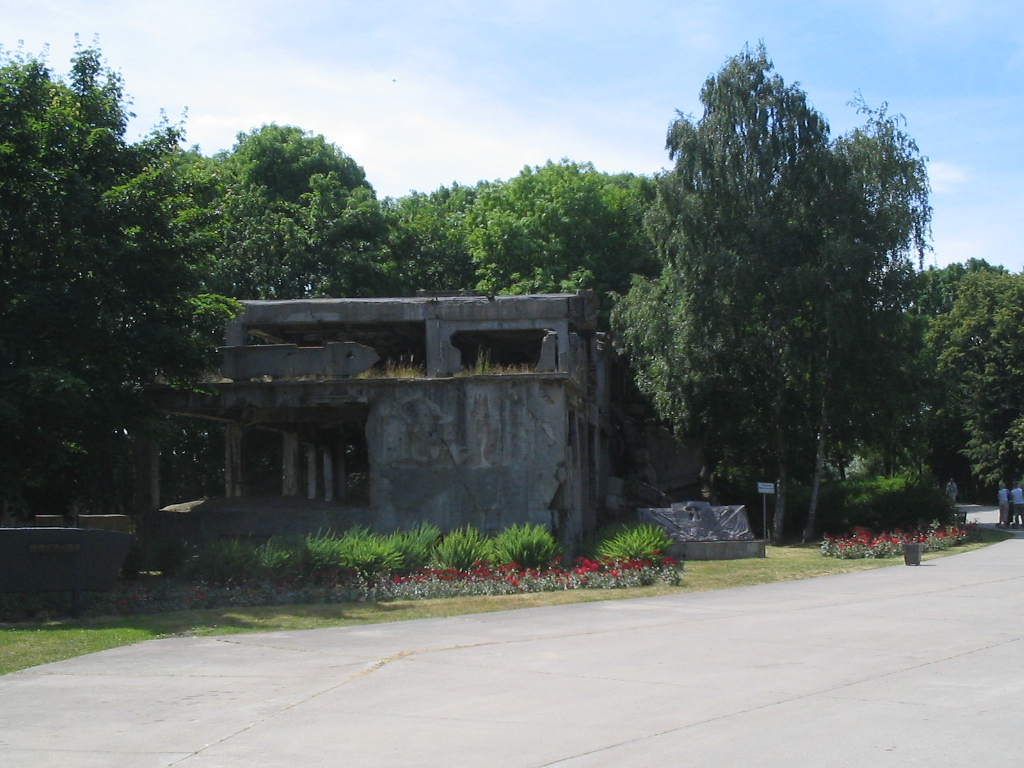
Barrack ruins at Westerplatte.

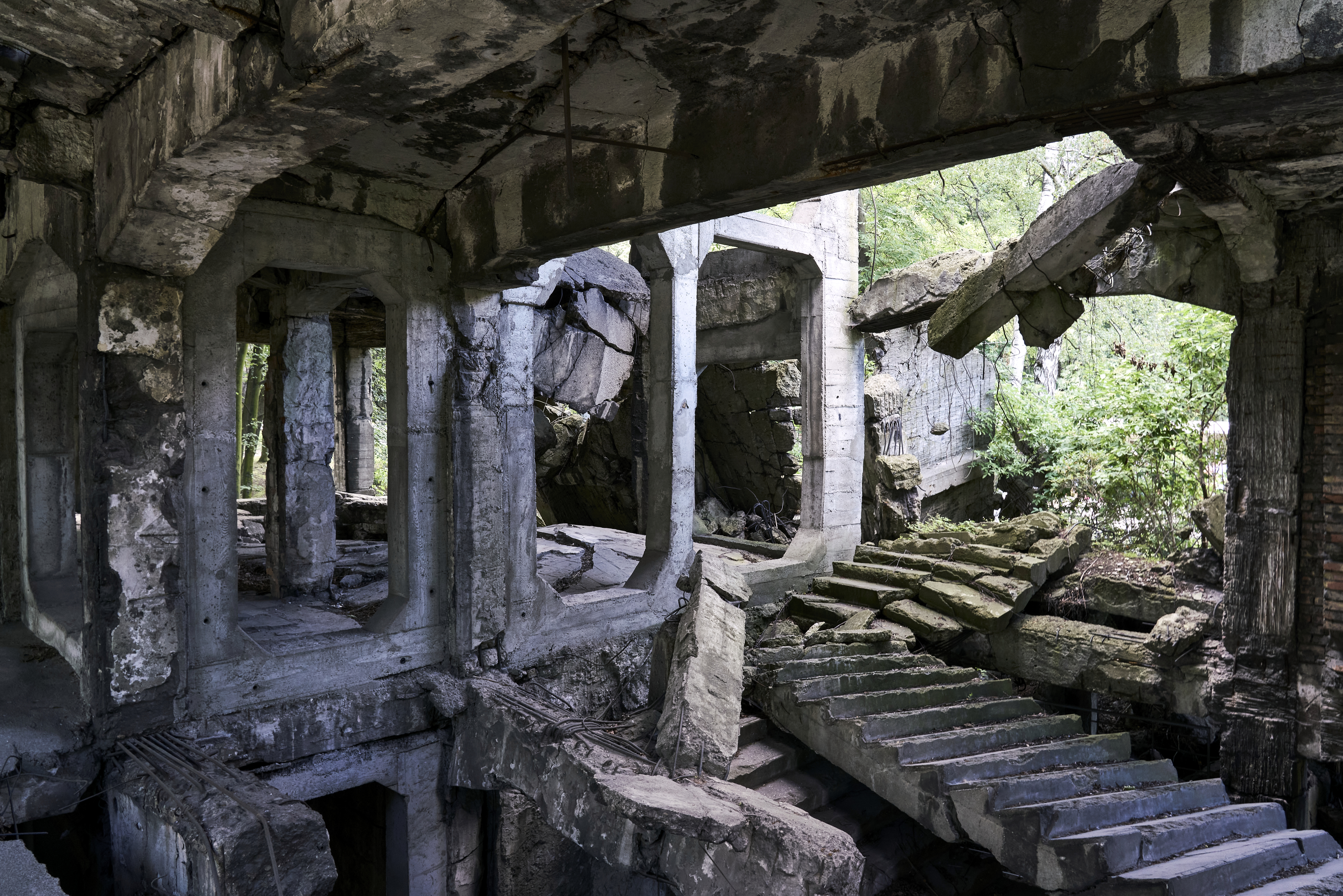
Basement of ruined barrack

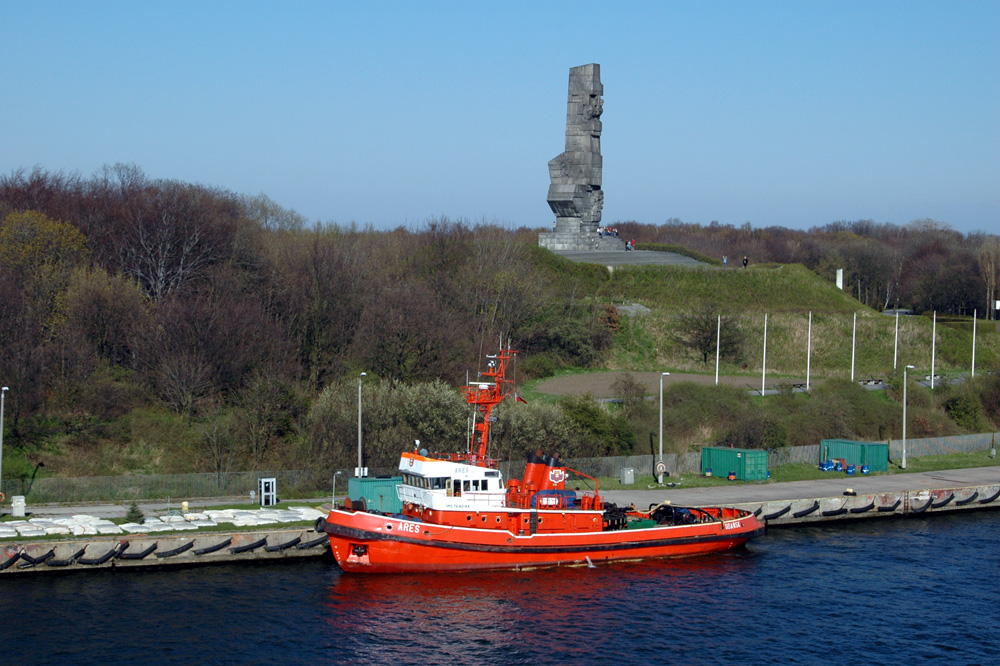
Monument seen from the mainland

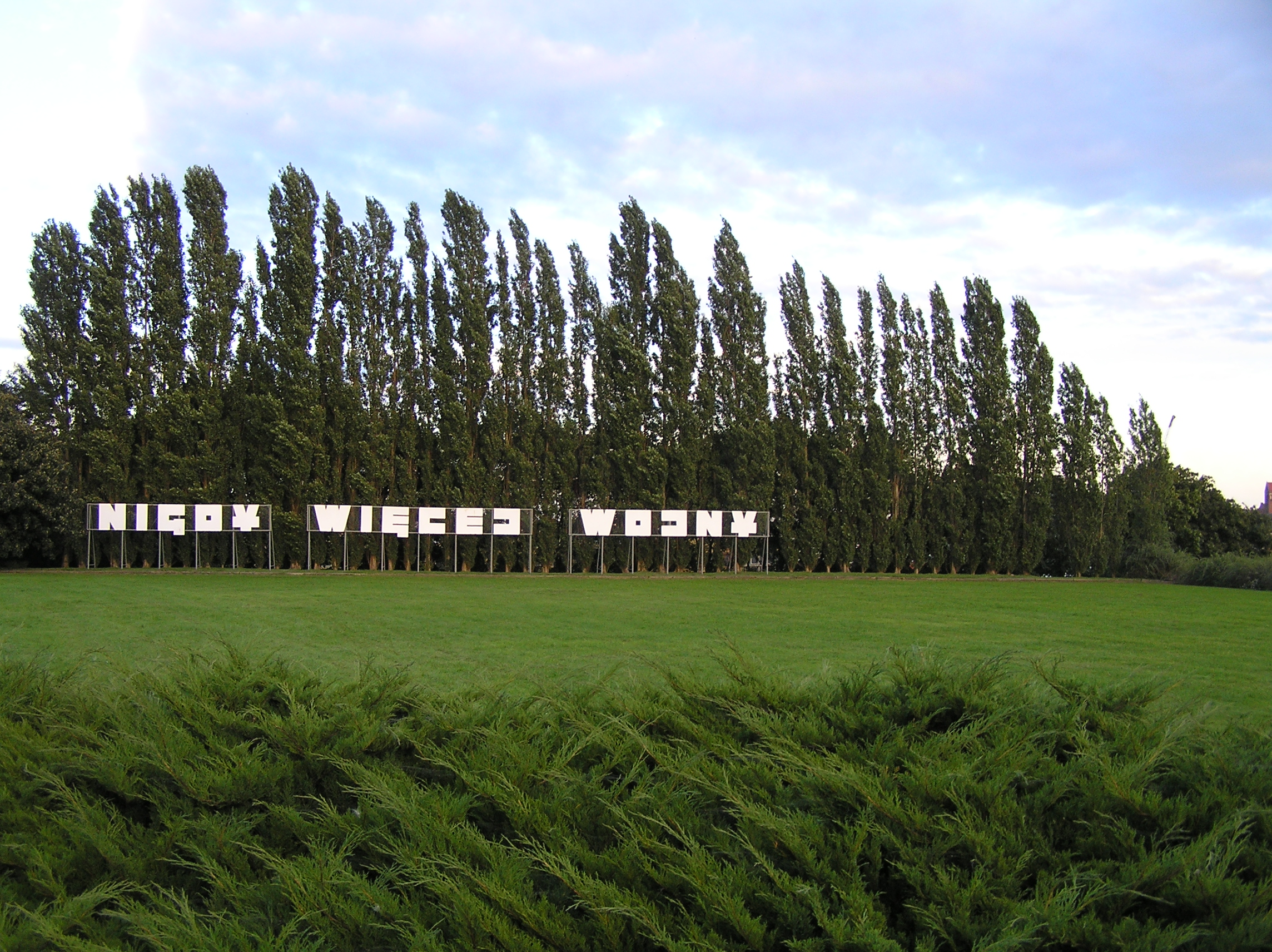
War: Never Again (Nigdy więcej wojny)

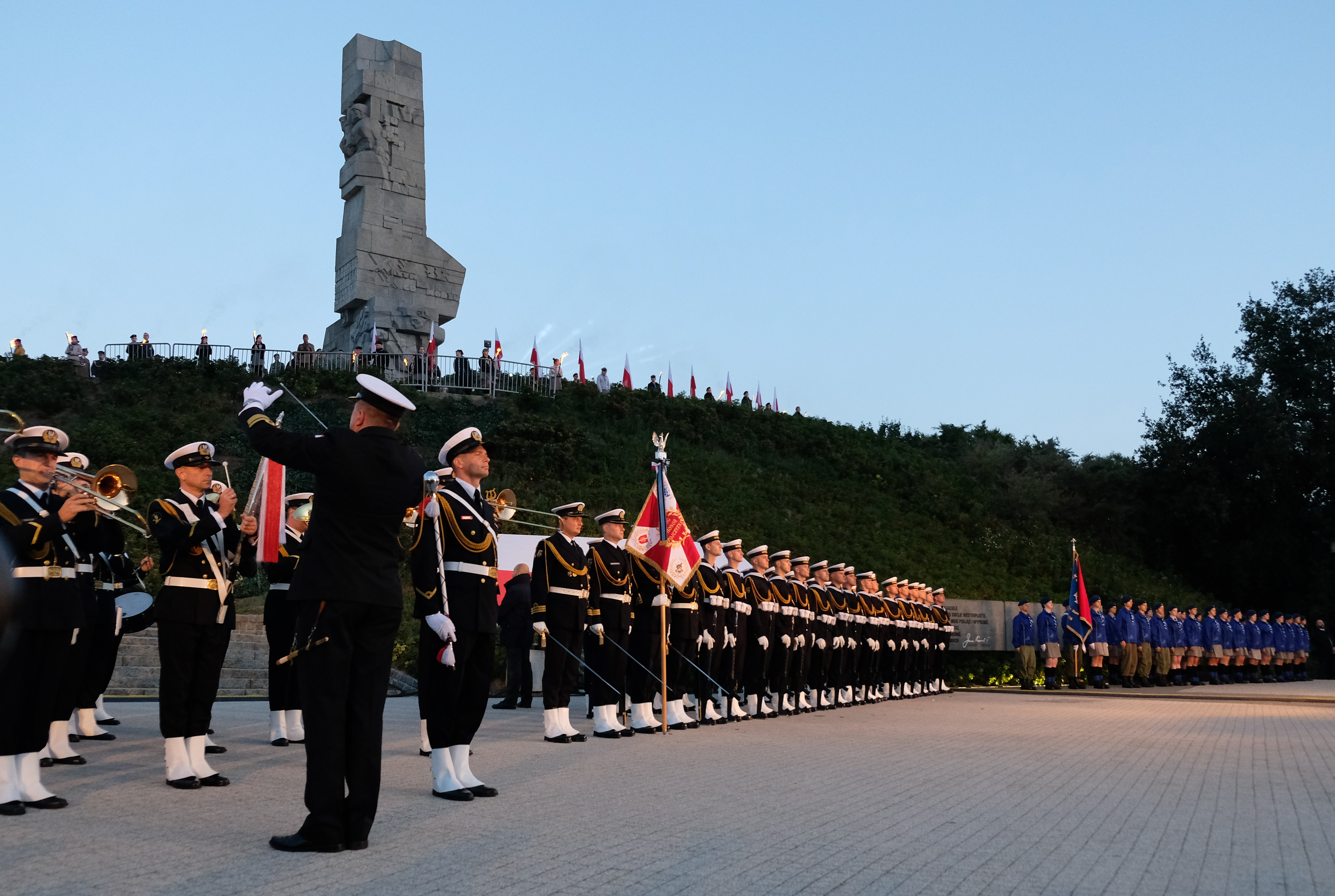
An honour guard at Westerplatte in 2018.

== See also ==
- Franciszek Dąbrowski
- Karol Szwedowski
- The German invasion of Poland
- The Polish Army
- The German Wehrmacht
