= SMS Preussen (1903) =

Battleship of the German Imperial Navy

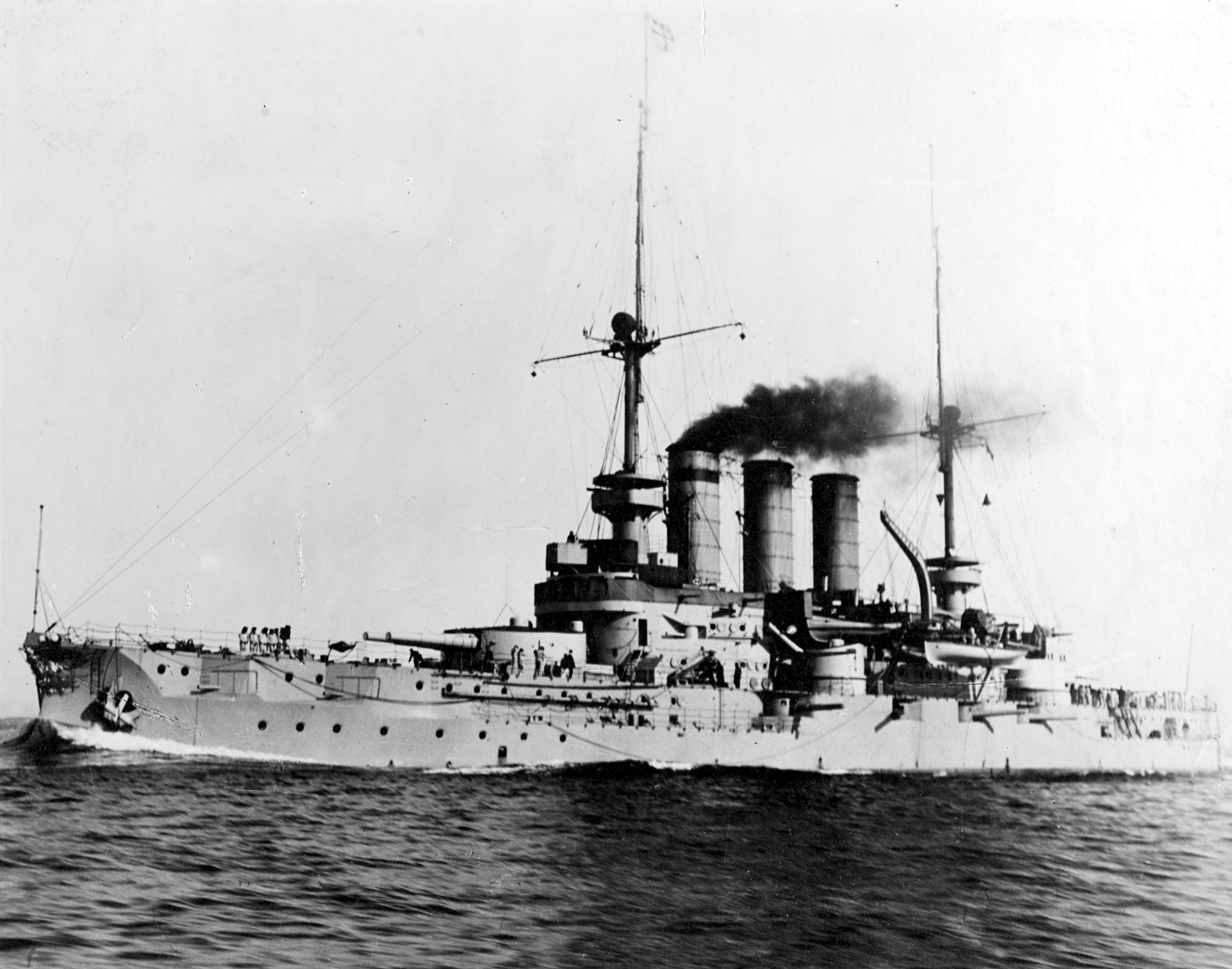
- Preussen in 1907

History

Germany
- Name: Preussen
- Namesake: Prussia
- Builder: AG Vulcan Stettin
- Laid down: April 1902
- Launched: 30 October 1903
- Commissioned: 12 July 1905
- Stricken: 5 April 1929
- Fate: Scrapped, 1931

General characteristics
- Class & type: Braunschweig-class battleship
- Displacement: Normal: 13,208 t (12,999 long tons); Full load: 14,394 t (14,167 long tons)
- Length: 127.7 m (419 ft) (loa)
- Beam: 22.2 m (73 ft)
- Draft: 8.1 m (27 ft)
- Installed power: 16,000 metric horsepower (15,781 ihp; 11,768 kW); 8 × water-tube boilers; 6 × cylindrical boilers
- Propulsion: 3 × triple-expansion steam engines; 3 × screw propellers
- Speed: 18 knots (33 km/h; 21 mph)
- Range: 5,200 nautical miles (9,600 km; 6,000 mi); 10 knots (20 km/h; 10 mph)
- Complement: 35 officers; 708 enlisted men
- Armament: 4 × 28 cm (11 in) SK L/40 guns; 14 × 17 cm (6.7 in) SK L/40 guns; 18 × 8.8 cm (3.5 in) SK L/35 guns; 6 × 45 cm (17.7 in) torpedo tubes
- Armor: Belt: 110 to 250 mm (4.3 to 9.8 in); Turrets: 250 mm (9.8 in); Deck: 40 mm (1.6 in)

SMS Preussen (Note: "SMS" stands for "Seiner Majestät Schiff" (English: His Majesty's Ship).) was the fourth of five pre-dreadnought battleships of the Braunschweig class, built for the German Kaiserliche Marine (Imperial Navy). She was laid down in April 1902, was launched in October 1903, and was commissioned in July 1905. Named for the state of Prussia, (Note: Prussia was spelled Preußen in German, using the German eszett (ß, or "sharp S"), though there is no capital eszett and German ship names were rendered in all capitals, so the ship's name was rendered PREUSSEN.) the ship was armed with a battery of four 28 cm (11 in) guns and had a top speed of 18 knots (33 km/h; 21 mph). Like all pre-dreadnoughts built at the turn of the century, Preussen was quickly made obsolete by the launching of the revolutionary HMS Dreadnought in 1906; as a result, she saw only limited service with the German fleet.

Preussen's peacetime career centered on squadron and fleet exercises and training cruises to foreign ports. The ship served as the flagship of II Battle Squadron of the High Seas Fleet for the majority of her career. During World War I, she served as a guard ship in the German Bight and later in the Danish Straits. She participated in a fleet sortie in December 1914 in support of the Raid on Scarborough, Hartlepool and Whitby during which the German fleet briefly clashed with a detachment of the British Grand Fleet. Preussen had been temporarily assigned to guard ship duties in the Baltic in May 1916, and so missed the Battle of Jutland. Due to her age, she did not rejoin the fleet, and instead continued to serve as a guard ship until 1917, when she became a tender for U-boats based in Wilhelmshaven.

After the war, Preussen was retained by the re-formed Reichsmarine and converted into a depot ship for F-type minesweepers. She was stricken from the naval register in April 1929 and sold to ship breakers in 1931. A 63-meter (207 ft) section of her hull was retained as a target; it was bombed and sunk in 1945 by Allied bombers at the end of World War II, and was scrapped in 1954.

== Design ==
Plan and profile drawing of the Braunschweig class

With the passage of the Second Naval Law under the direction of Vizeadmiral (VAdm—Vice Admiral) Alfred von Tirpitz in 1900, funding was allocated for a new class of battleships, to succeed the Wittelsbach-class ships authorized under the 1898 Naval Law. By this time, Krupp, the supplier of naval artillery to the Kaiserliche Marine (Imperial Navy) had developed quick-firing, 28-centimeter (11 in) guns; the largest guns that had previously incorporated the technology were the 24 cm (9.4 in) guns mounted on the Wittelsbachs. The Design Department of the Reichsmarineamt (Imperial Navy Office) adopted these guns for the new battleships, along with an increase from 15 cm (5.9 in) to 17 cm (6.7 in) for the secondary battery, owing to the increased threat from torpedo boats as torpedoes became more effective.

Though the Braunschweig class marked a significant improvement over earlier German battleships, its design fell victim to the rapid pace of technological development in the early 1900s. The British battleship HMS Dreadnought—armed with ten 12-inch (30.5 cm) guns—was commissioned in December 1906, less than a year and a half after Preussen entered service. Dreadnought's revolutionary design rendered every capital ship of the German navy obsolete, including Preussen.

Preussen was 127.7 m (419 ft) long overall and had a beam of 22.2 m (72 ft 10 in) and a draft of 8.1 m (26 ft 7 in) forward. She displaced 13,208 t (12,999 long tons) as designed and 14,394 t (14,167 long tons) at full load. Her crew consisted of 35 officers and 708 enlisted men. The ship was powered by three 3-cylinder vertical triple expansion engines that drove three screws. Steam was provided by eight naval and six cylindrical boilers, all of which burned coal. Preussen's powerplant was rated at 16,000 metric horsepower (15,781 ihp; 11,768 kW), which generated a top speed of 18 knots (33 km/h; 21 mph). She could steam 5,200 nautical miles (9,600 km; 6,000 mi) at a cruising speed of 10 knots (19 km/h; 12 mph).

Preussen's armament consisted of a main battery of four 28 cm (11 in) SK L/40 guns in twin gun turrets, (Note: In Imperial German Navy gun nomenclature, "SK" (Schnelladekanone) denotes that the gun is quick firing, while the L/40 denotes the length of the gun. In this case, the L/40 gun is 40 caliber, meaning that the gun is 40 times as long as it is in diameter.) one fore and one aft of the central superstructure. Her secondary armament consisted of fourteen 17 cm (6.7 inch) SK L/40 guns and eighteen 8.8 cm (3.45 in) SK L/35 quick-firing guns. The armament suite was rounded out with six 45 cm (17.7 in) torpedo tubes, all mounted submerged in the hull. One tube was in the bow, two were on each broadside, and the final tube was in the stern. Preussen was protected with Krupp armor. Her armored belt was 110 to 225 millimeters (4.3 to 8.9 in) thick, the heavier armor in the central citadel that protected her magazines and propulsion machinery spaces, and the thinner plating at either end of the hull. Her deck was 40 mm (1.6 in) thick. The main battery turrets had 250 mm of armor plating.

== Service history ==
=== Construction through 1907 ===
Preussen was laid down in April 1902 at the AG Vulcan shipyard in Stettin under construction number 256. The fourth unit of her class, she had been ordered under the contract name "K" as a new unit for the fleet. (Note: German warships were ordered under provisional names. Additions to the fleet were given a single letter; ships intended to replace older or lost vessels were ordered as "Ersatz (name of the ship to be replaced)".) Preussen was launched on 30 October 1903, with a speech given by Chancellor Bernhard von Bülow and the christening performed by Empress Augusta Victoria. The ship was commissioned into the fleet on 12 July 1905. Sea trials lasted until September, when she formally joined II Squadron, where she replaced the battleship Kaiser Friedrich III as the squadron flagship. VAdm Max von Fischel was the squadron commander at the time.

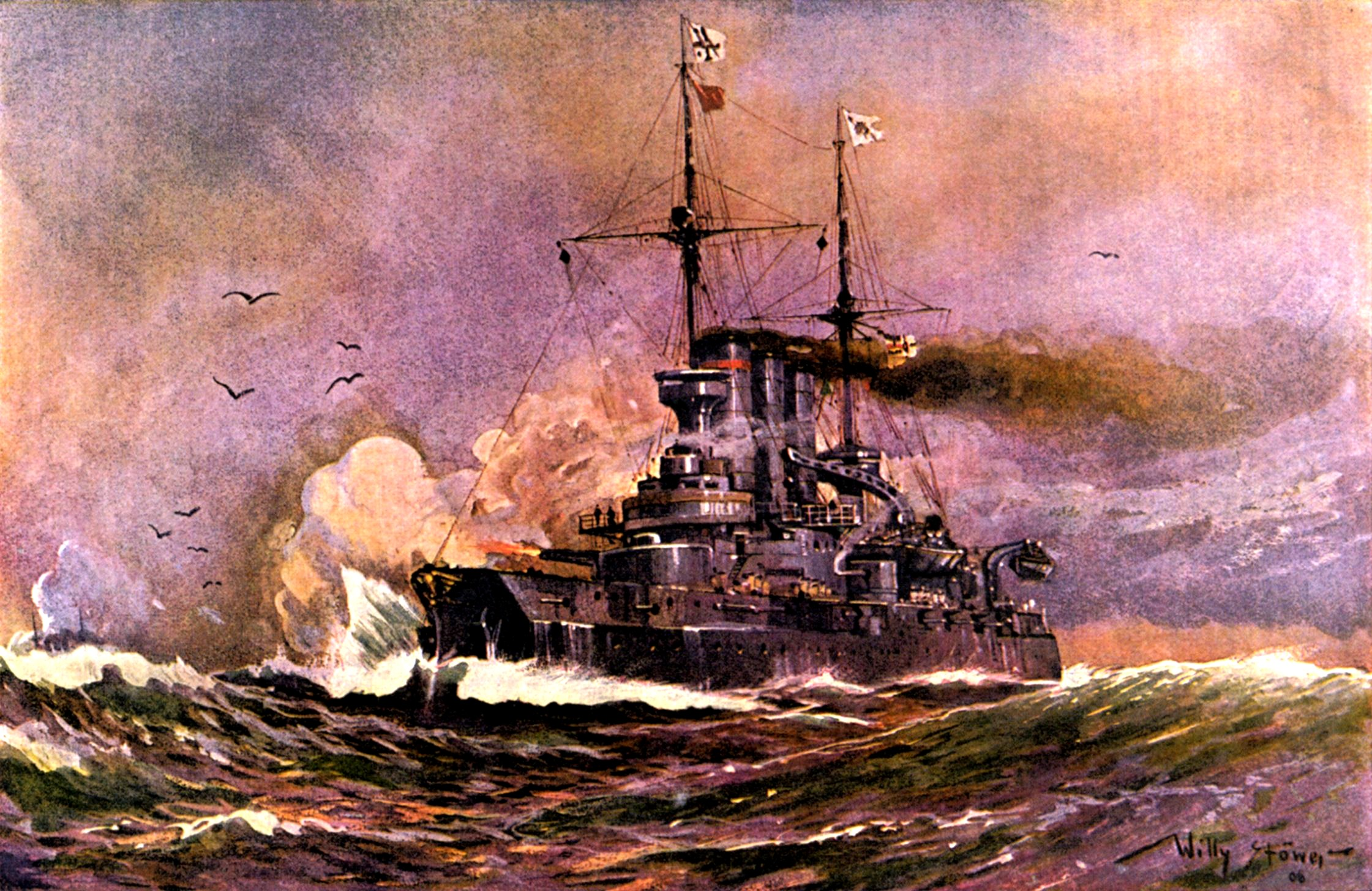
A painting of Preussen during gunnery training by Willy Stöwer in 1906

The German fleet was occupied with extensive training exercises during the early 1900s. The ships were occupied with individual, division and squadron exercises throughout April 1906, the only interruption being in February, when Preussen carried Kaiser Wilhelm II to Copenhagen in company with the light cruiser Ariadne and the torpedo boats S121 and G111. Wilhelm II attended the burial of the Danish King Christian IX, who had died the previous month. Starting on 13 May, major fleet exercises took place in the North Sea and lasted until 8 June with a cruise around the Skagen into the Baltic. During Kiel Week on 21 June, Preussen received a gift from the provinces of West Prussia and East Prussia, in the form of a Prussian war flag. The fleet began its usual summer cruise to Norway in mid-July, and the fleet was present for the birthday of Norwegian King Haakon VII on 3 August. The German ships departed the following day for Helgoland, to join exercises being conducted there.

The fleet was back in Kiel by 15 August, where preparations for the autumn maneuvers began. On 22–24 August, the fleet took part in landing exercises in Eckernförde Bay outside Kiel. The maneuvers were paused from 31 August to 3 September when the fleet hosted vessels from Denmark and Sweden, along with a Russian squadron from 3 to 9 September in Kiel. The maneuvers resumed on 8 September and lasted five more days. The ship participated in the uneventful winter cruise into the Kattegat and Skagerrak from 8 to 16 December. The first quarter of 1907 followed the previous pattern and, on 16 February, the Active Battle Fleet was re-designated the High Seas Fleet. From the end of May to early June the fleet went on its summer cruise in the North Sea, returning to the Baltic via the Kattegat. This was followed by the regular cruise to Norway from 12 July to 10 August, after which the fleet conducted the annual autumn maneuvers, which lasted from 26 August to 6 September. The exercises included landing exercises in northern Schleswig with IX Corps. On 1 October 1907, Konteradmiral (KAdm—Rear Admiral) Ludwig von Schröder came aboard Preussen, taking command of the squadron, as Fischel had become the chief of the Marinestation der Nordsee (Naval Station of the North Sea). The winter training cruise went into the Kattegat from 22 to 30 November.

=== 1908–1914 ===
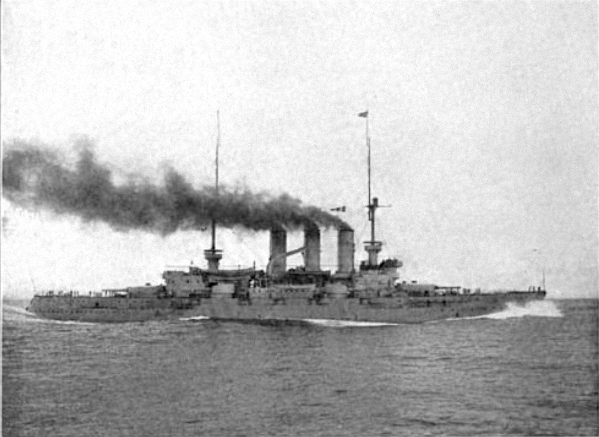
Preussen underway, c. 1908

The fleet conducted training exercises in the Baltic in February 1908. Prince Heinrich, then the commander of the High Seas Fleet, had pressed for such a cruise the previous year, arguing that it would prepare the fleet for overseas operations and would break up the monotony of training in German waters, though tensions with Britain over the developing Anglo-German naval arms race were high. The fleet departed Kiel on 17 July, passed through the Kaiser Wilhelm Canal to the North Sea, and continued to the Atlantic. During the cruise, Preussen visited Las Palmas in the Canary Islands. The fleet returned to Germany on 13 August. The autumn maneuvers followed from 27 August to 12 September. Later that year, the fleet toured coastal German cities as part of an effort to increase public support for naval expenditures.

In early 1909, Preussen and the battleships Pommern and Schleswig-Holstein were sent to break paths in the sea ice off the coast of Holstein for merchant shipping. Another cruise into the Atlantic was conducted from 7 July to 1 August, during which Preussen stopped in Ferrol, Spain. On the way back to Germany, the High Seas Fleet was received by the British Royal Navy in Spithead. Later that year, Admiral Henning von Holtzendorff became the fleet commander. Holtzendorff's tenure as fleet commander was marked by strategic experimentation, owing to the increased threat the latest underwater weapons posed and the fact that the new Nassau-class battleships were too wide to pass through the Kaiser Wilhelm Canal. Accordingly, the fleet was transferred from the Baltic Sea port of Kiel to the North Sea port of Wilhelmshaven on 1 April 1910.

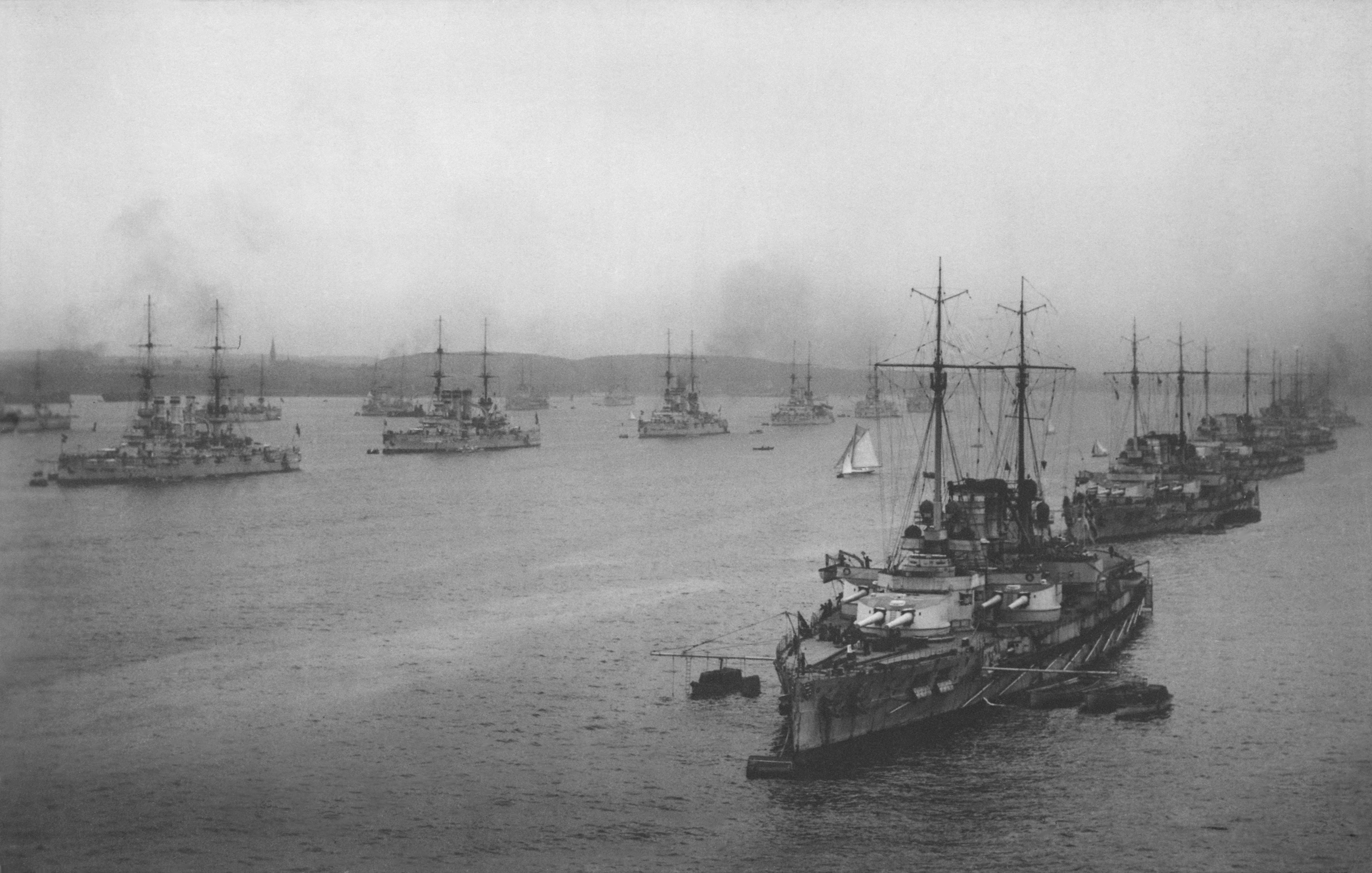
I (foreground) and II Squadrons (background) in Kiel

In May 1910, the fleet conducted training maneuvers in the Kattegat. These were in accordance with Holtzendorff's strategy, which envisioned drawing the Royal Navy into the narrow waters there. The annual summer cruise was to Norway, and was followed by fleet training, during which another fleet review was held in Danzig on 29 August. After the conclusion of the maneuvers, Schröder was promoted to chief of the Marinestation der Ostsee (Naval Station of the Baltic Sea), his place aboard Preussen being taken by VAdm Friedrich von Ingenohl. A training cruise into the Baltic followed at the end of the year. In March 1911, the fleet held exercises in the Skagerrak and Kattegat, and the year's autumn maneuvers were confined to the Baltic and the Kattegat. Another fleet review was held during the exercises for a visiting Austro-Hungarian delegation that included Archduke Franz Ferdinand and Admiral Rudolf Montecuccoli.

In mid-1912, due to the Agadir Crisis, the summer cruise was confined to the Baltic, to avoid exposing the fleet during the period of heightened tension with Britain and France. On 30 January 1913, Holtzendorff was relieved as the fleet commander, owing in large part due to Wilhelm II's displeasure with his strategic vision; Ingenohl took Holtzendorff's place, and KAdm Reinhard Scheer in turn replaced Ingenohl as II Squadron commander on 4 February. In late August, the squadron steamed through the Kaiser Wilhelm Canal at the start of the autumn maneuvers to reach the island of Helgoland; the voyage through the canal was notable, because the canal had been closed for over a year while it was enlarged to allow the passage of larger dreadnought battleships. Preussen went into dry dock in November for periodic maintenance, and as a result, missed training exercises conducted that month.

Preussen participated in ceremonies at Sonderburg on 2 May to celebrate the 50th anniversary of the Battle of Dybbøl of the Second Schleswig War; she was joined by her sister ships Hessen and Lothringen, the battleship Schlesien, and the armored cruiser Blücher. The ship was present during the fleet cruise to Norway in July 1914, which was cut short by the July Crisis following the assassination of Archduke Franz Ferdinand the month before and subsequent rise in international tensions. On 25 July the ship's crew was made aware of Austria-Hungary's ultimatum to Serbia; Preussen left Norway to rendezvous with the rest of the fleet the following day. Preussen had been slated to be decommissioned at the end of the year, her place as the squadron flagship to be taken by the dreadnought Westfalen. Preussen was to then replace Wittelsbach in the Reserve Division of the Baltic Sea, but the outbreak of World War I cancelled those plans.

=== World War I ===
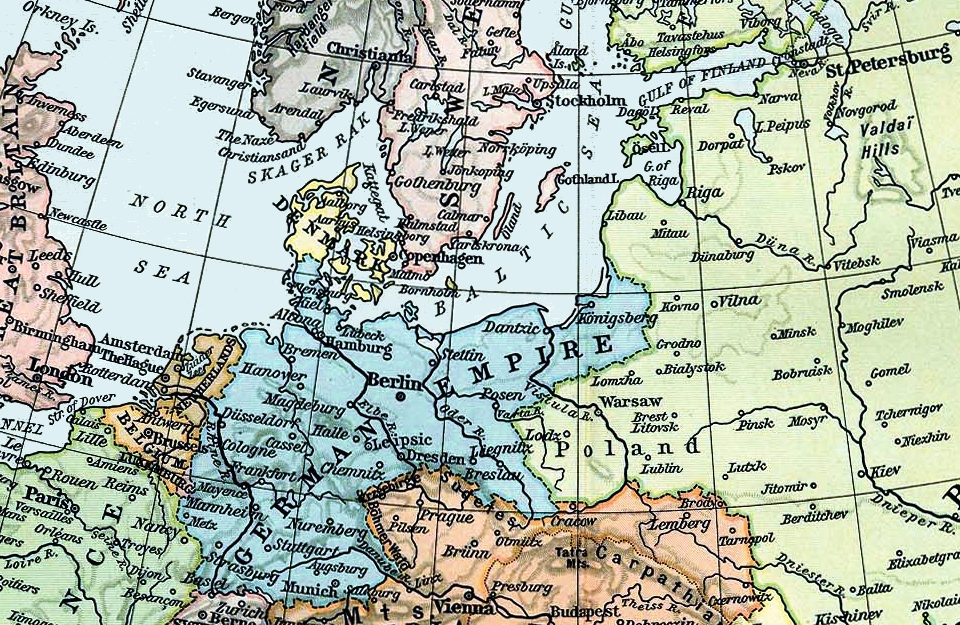
Map of the North and Baltic Seas in 1911

After the outbreak of war in August 1914, the German command deployed II Squadron in the German Bight to defend Germany's coast from a major attack from the Royal Navy that the Germans presumed was imminent. Preussen and her squadron mates were stationed in the mouth of the Elbe to support the vessels on patrol duty in the Bight. Once it became clear that the British would not attack the High Seas Fleet, the Germans began a series of operations designed to lure out a portion of the numerically superior British Grand Fleet and destroy it. By achieving a rough equality of forces, the German navy could then force a decisive battle in the southern portion of the North Sea.

The first such operation in which the High Seas Fleet participated was the raid on Scarborough, Hartlepool and Whitby on 15–16 December 1914. The main fleet acted as distant support for KAdm Franz von Hipper's battlecruiser squadron while it raided the coastal towns. On the evening of 15 December, the fleet came to within 10 nmi (19 km; 12 mi) of an isolated squadron of six British battleships. However, skirmishes between the rival destroyer screens in the darkness convinced Ingenohl, who was now the German fleet commander, that the entire Grand Fleet was deployed before him. Under orders from Wilhelm II to avoid battle if victory was not certain, Ingenohl broke off the engagement and turned the battlefleet back towards Germany. At the end of the month, Scheer was replaced by KAdm Felix Funke, Scheer going on to command III Battle Squadron.

On 14 March 1915, Preussen went to Kiel for periodic maintenance, and she was replaced as the squadron flagship by the battleship Deutschland. The latter vessel held the position for the remainder of the squadron's existence, with the exceptions of 19 September to 16 October 1915, 25 February to 7 April 1916, in September that year, and from 22 January to 10 February 1917; during each of these periods, Preussen temporarily resumed the flagship role. Starting in April 1916, the ships of II Squadron were tasked with patrolling the Danish Straits; each ship of the squadron was to rotate through the duty, the others remaining in the Elbe or serving with the main fleet. Preussen began her first stint on 21 April, replacing Hessen; she was accordingly absent during the bombardment of Yarmouth and Lowestoft three days later. On 4 May, Preussen was relieved and she returned to the Elbe, though she was transferred back to the straits on 21 May, remaining there until 8 June. As a result, she missed the Battle of Jutland, fought on 31 May – 1 June in the North Sea. Her sister ship Lothringen also missed the battle, as she had been deemed to be in too poor a condition to participate in the fleet sortie.

Jutland proved to Scheer, who was now the fleet commander, that the pre-dreadnought battleships were too vulnerable to take part in a major fleet action, and so he detached II Squadron from the High Seas Fleet. As a result, Preussen remained in service only as a guard ship. She saw further stints in the Danish straits from 30 June to 23 July and from 15 to 31 August. On 13 March 1917, Preussen left the Elbe and steamed to the Baltic, where she was temporarily used as an icebreaker to clear a path to Swinemünde. She was decommissioned on 5 August, and most of her crew were transferred to the new battlecruiser Hindenburg. From then to the end of the war, she served as a tender for III U-boat Flotilla based in Wilhelmshaven. Preussen briefly held Edouard Izac, a US Navy sailor captured after his ship was sunk by U-90, in June 1918; Izac would go on to escape from a German prisoner of war camp and win the Medal of Honor.

=== Post-war career ===
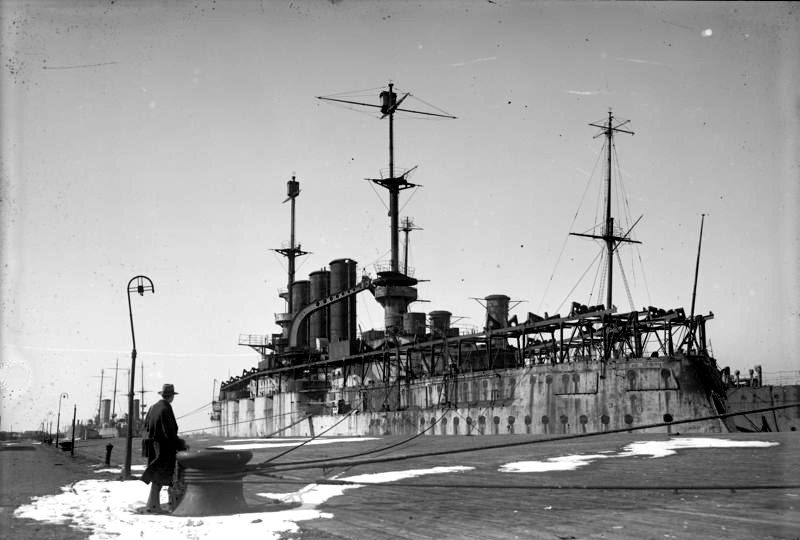
Preussen after having been converted into a depot ship.

Following the German defeat in World War I, the German navy was reorganized as the Reichsmarine according to the Treaty of Versailles. The new navy was permitted to retain eight pre-dreadnought battleships under Article 181—two of which would be in reserve—for coastal defense. Preussen was among those ships chosen to remain on active service with the Reichsmarine. The ship was converted into a parent ship for F-type minesweepers at the Reichsmarinewerft in Wilhelmshaven in 1919; the ship was disarmed and platforms for holding the minesweepers were installed.

Preussen was commissioned with the Reichsmarine to support the minesweeping effort, though she proved to be too top-heavy to serve as an effective mothership, and she was soon replaced by the old light cruiser Arcona. Preussen was placed in reserve and was left out of service until 1929, when she was stricken from the naval register on 5 April. The Reichsmarine sold her to ship breakers on 25 February 1931 for 216,800 Reichsmarks. Preussen was subsequently broken up for scrap in Wilhelmshaven, though a 63 m (207 ft) length of her hull was retained as a testing target for underwater weapons, including torpedoes and mines. The section of hull was nicknamed "SMS Vierkant ("SMS Rectangle"). Allied bombers attacked and sank the section of Preussen's hull in April 1945. It was eventually raised and scrapped in late 1954.
