= SMS Lothringen =

Pre-dreadnought battleship of the German Imperial Navy

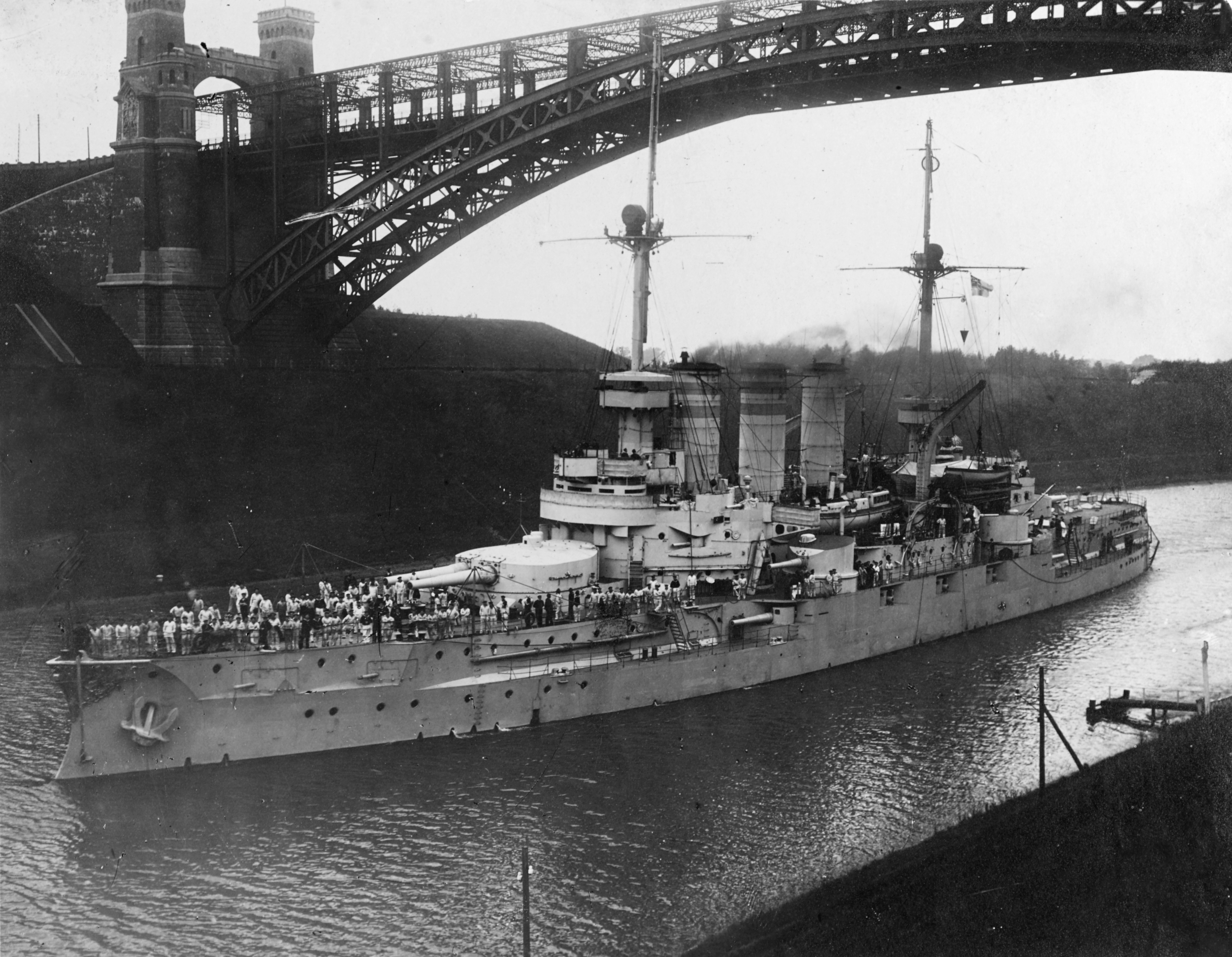
- SMS Lothringen in the Kiel Canal passing under the Levensau High Bridge

History

Germany
- Name: Lothringen
- Namesake: Lorraine ("Lothringen" in German)
- Builder: Schichau, Danzig
- Laid down: 1 December 1902
- Launched: 27 May 1904
- Commissioned: 18 May 1906
- Decommissioned: 2 March 1920
- Stricken: 31 March 1931
- Fate: Scrapped in 1931

General characteristics
- Class & type: Braunschweig-class battleship
- Displacement: Normal: 13,208 t (12,999 long tons); Full load: 14,394 t (14,167 long tons)
- Length: 127.7 m (419 ft) (loa)
- Beam: 22.2 m (73 ft)
- Draft: 8.1 m (27 ft)
- Installed power: 16,000 metric horsepower (15,781 ihp; 11,768 kW); 8 × water-tube boilers; 6 × cylindrical boilers
- Propulsion: 3 × triple-expansion steam engines; 3 × screw propellers
- Speed: 18 knots (33 km/h; 21 mph)
- Range: 5,200 nautical miles (9,600 km; 6,000 mi); 10 knots (20 km/h; 10 mph)
- Complement: 35 officers; 708 enlisted men
- Armament: 4 × 28 cm (11 in) SK L/40 guns; 14 × 17 cm (6.7 in) SK L/40 guns; 18 × 8.8 cm (3.5 in) SK L/35 guns; 6 × 45 cm (17.7 in) torpedo tubes
- Armor: Belt: 110 to 250 mm (4.3 to 9.8 in); Turrets: 250 mm (9.8 in); Deck: 40 mm (1.6 in)

SMS Lothringen (Note: "SMS" stands for "Seiner Majestät Schiff" (English: His Majesty's Ship).) was the last of five pre-dreadnought battleships of the Braunschweig class, built for the German Kaiserliche Marine (Imperial Navy). She was laid down in December 1902, was launched in May 1904, and was commissioned in May 1906. She was named for Lothringen (now Lorraine), a province of the German Empire from 1871 to 1918. The ship was armed with a battery of four 28 cm (11 in) guns and had a top speed of 18 knots (33 km/h; 21 mph). Like all other pre-dreadnoughts built around the turn of the century, Lothringen was quickly made obsolete by the launching of the revolutionary HMS Dreadnought in December 1906; as a result, her career as a front-line battleship was cut short.

Lothringen's peacetime career centered on squadron and fleet exercises and training cruises with II Battle Squadron. Scheduled to be withdrawn from service in July 1914 and replaced by newer dreadnought battleships, the outbreak of World War I that month prevented her retirement. She spent the first two years of the war primarily serving as a guard ship in the German Bight. She and the rest of II Squadron joined the dreadnoughts of the High Seas Fleet to support the raid on Scarborough, Hartlepool, and Whitby in December 1914. In poor condition by 1916, she was withdrawn from fleet service in February. She thereafter patrolled the Danish Straits until she was replaced by the battleship Hannover in September 1917. She spent the rest of the war as a disarmed training ship.

After the war, Lothringen was retained by the re-formed Reichsmarine and converted into a depot ship for F-type minesweepers from 1919 to 1920. After the task of clearing the wartime minefields in the North Sea was completed, she was placed in reserve in March 1920. The ship remained inactive for the next decade and was stricken from the naval register in March 1931 and sold to ship breakers later that year.

== Design ==
Plan and profile drawing of the Braunschweig class

With the passage of the Second Naval Law under the direction of Vizeadmiral (VAdm—Vice Admiral) Alfred von Tirpitz in 1900, funding was allocated for a new class of battleships, to succeed the Wittelsbach-class ships authorized under the 1898 Naval Law. By this time, Krupp, the supplier of naval artillery to the Kaiserliche Marine (Imperial Navy), had developed quick-firing, 28-centimeter (11 in) guns; the largest guns that had previously incorporated the technology were the 24 cm (9.4 in) guns mounted on the Wittelsbachs. The Design Department of the Reichsmarineamt (Imperial Navy Office) adopted these guns for the new battleships, along with an increase from 15 cm (5.9 in) to 17 cm (6.7 in) for the secondary battery, owing to the increased threat from torpedo boats as torpedoes became more effective.

Though the Braunschweig class marked a significant improvement over earlier German battleships, its design fell victim to the rapid pace of technological development in the early 1900s. The British battleship HMS Dreadnought—armed with ten 12-inch (30.5 cm) guns—was commissioned in December 1906, just six months after Lothringen entered service. Dreadnought's revolutionary design rendered every capital ship of the German navy obsolete, including Lothringen.

Lothringen was 127.7 m (419 ft) long overall and had a beam of 22.2 m (73 ft) and a draft of 8.1 m (27 ft) forward. She displaced 13,208 t (12,999 long tons) as designed and 14,394 t (14,167 long tons) at full load. Her crew consisted of 35 officers and 708 enlisted men. The ship was powered by three 3-cylinder vertical triple expansion engines that drove three screws. Steam was provided by eight naval and six cylindrical Scotch marine boilers, all of which burned coal. Lothringen's powerplant was rated at 16,000 metric horsepower (15,781 ihp; 11,768 kW), which generated a top speed of 18 knots (33 km/h; 21 mph). She could steam 5,200 nautical miles (9,600 km; 6,000 mi) at a cruising speed of 10 knots (19 km/h; 12 mph).

Lothringen's armament consisted of a main battery of four 28 cm (11 in) SK L/40 guns in twin gun turrets, (Note: In Imperial German Navy gun nomenclature, "SK" (Schnelladekanone) denotes that the gun is quick firing, while the L/40 denotes the length of the gun. In this case, the L/40 gun is 40 caliber, meaning that the gun is 40 times as long as its bore is.) one fore and one aft of the central superstructure. Her secondary armament consisted of fourteen 17 cm (6.7 inch) SK L/40 guns in armored casemates and eighteen 8.8 cm (3.45 in) SK L/35 quick-firing guns in single pivot mounts. The armament suite was rounded out with six 45 cm (17.7 in) torpedo tubes, all mounted submerged in the hull. One tube was in the bow, two were on each broadside, and the final tube was in the stern. Lothringen was protected with Krupp armor. Her armored belt was 110 to 225 millimeters (4.3 to 8.9 in) thick, with the heavier armor in the central citadel that protected her magazines and propulsion machinery spaces, and the thinner plating at either end of the hull. Her deck was 40 mm (1.6 in) thick. The main battery turrets had 250 mm of armor plating.

== Service history ==
=== Construction through 1907 ===
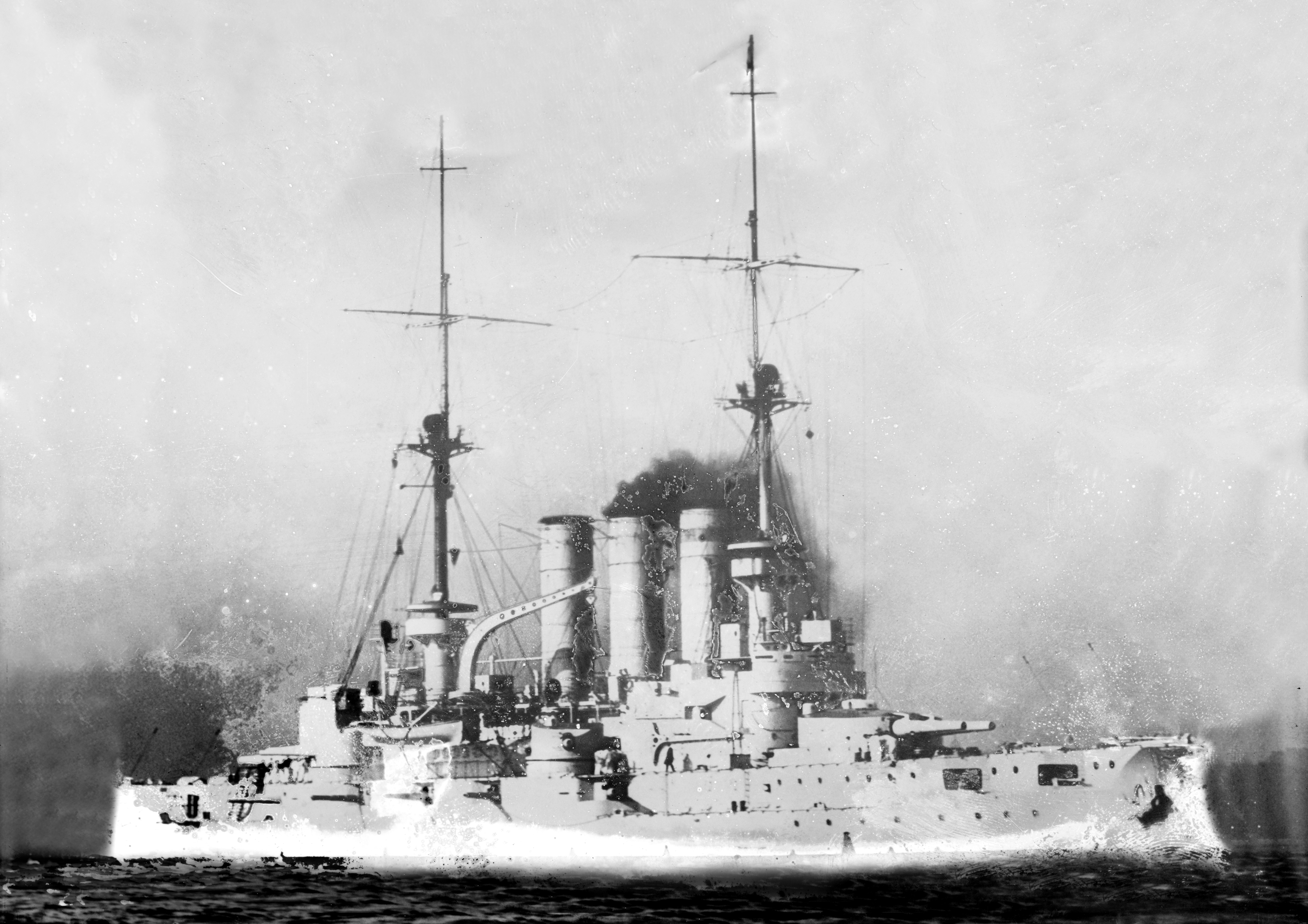
Lothringen, sometime before World War I

Lothringen was laid down on 1 December 1902, at the Schichau-Werke in Danzig under construction number 716. The fifth and final unit of her class, she was ordered under the contract name "M" as a new unit for the fleet. (Note: German warships were ordered under provisional names. Additions to the fleet were given a single letter; ships intended to replace older or lost vessels were ordered as "Ersatz (name of the ship to be replaced)".) Lothringen was launched on 27 May 1904 and the launching speech was given by Prince Hermann of Hohenlohe-Langenburg, the Reichsstatthalter (Imperial governor) of Alsace-Lorraine. She was commissioned into the fleet on 18 May 1906 and thereafter began sea trials. The ship formally joined II Battle Squadron on 1 July.

The German fleet was occupied with extensive training exercises and cruises abroad during the early 1900s. The fleet, including Lothringen, began its usual summer cruise to Norway in mid-July, and it was present for the birthday of Norwegian King Haakon VII on 3 August. The German ships departed the following day for Helgoland, to join exercises being conducted there. The fleet was back in Kiel by 15 August, where preparations for the autumn maneuvers began. On 22–24 August, the fleet took part in landing exercises in Eckernförde Bay outside Kiel. The maneuvers were paused from 31 August to 3 September when the fleet hosted vessels from Denmark and Sweden, along with a Russian squadron from 3 to 9 September, in Kiel. The maneuvers resumed on 8 September and lasted five more days.

The ship participated in the uneventful winter cruise into the Kattegat and Skagerrak from 8 to 16 December. The first quarter of 1907 followed the previous pattern and, on 16 February, the Active Battle Fleet was re-designated the High Seas Fleet. Lothringen participated in the festival celebrating the 300th anniversary of the birth of the Dutch admiral Michiel de Ruyter, steaming from Kiel to Vlissingen on 19 March 1907. From the end of May to early June the fleet went on its summer cruise in the North Sea, returning to the Baltic via the Kattegat. This was followed by the regular cruise to Norway from 12 July to 10 August, after which the fleet conducted the annual autumn maneuvers, which lasted from 26 August to 6 September. The exercises included landing exercises in northern Schleswig with IX Corps. Lothringen won the Kaiser's Schießpreis (shooting prize) for excellence in gunnery in II Squadron that year.

=== 1908–1914 ===
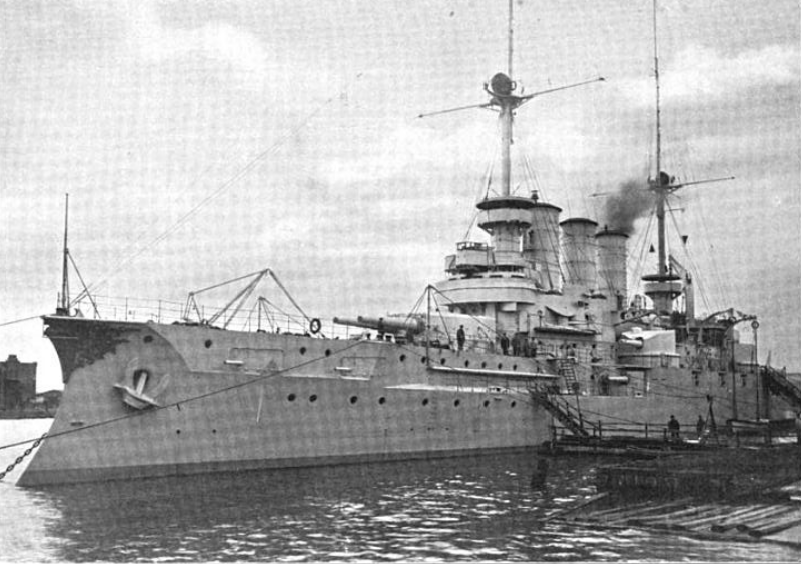
Lothringen in port, c. 1908

The fleet conducted training exercises in the Baltic in February 1908. In July, Lothringen and the rest of the fleet sailed into the Atlantic Ocean to conduct a major training cruise. Prince Heinrich, commander of the fleet, had pressed for such a cruise the previous year, arguing that it would prepare the fleet for overseas operations and would break up the monotony of training in German waters, though tensions with Britain over the developing Anglo-German naval arms race were high. The fleet departed Kiel on 17 July, passed through the Kaiser Wilhelm Canal to the North Sea, and continued to the Atlantic through the English Channel. The fleet returned to Germany on 13 August. The autumn maneuvers followed from 27 August to 12 September. Later that year, the fleet toured coastal German cities as part of an effort to increase public support for naval expenditure. Another cruise into the Atlantic was conducted from 7 July to 1 August 1909. On the way back to Germany, the High Seas Fleet was received by the British Royal Navy in Spithead.

Later that year, Admiral Henning von Holtzendorff became the fleet commander. Holtzendorff's tenure was marked by strategic experimentation, owing to the increased threat the latest underwater weapons posed and the fact that the new Nassau-class battleships were too wide to pass through the Kaiser Wilhelm Canal. Accordingly, the fleet was transferred from Kiel to Wilhelmshaven on 1 April 1910. In May 1910, the fleet conducted training maneuvers in the Kattegat. These were following Holtzendorff's strategy, which envisioned drawing the Royal Navy into the narrow waters there. The annual summer cruise was to Norway and was followed by fleet training, during which another fleet review was held in Danzig on 29 August. A training cruise into the Baltic followed at the end of the year. In March 1911, the fleet held exercises in the Skagerrak and Kattegat, and the year's autumn maneuvers were confined to the Baltic and the Kattegat. Another fleet review was held during the exercises for a visiting Austro-Hungarian delegation that included Archduke Franz Ferdinand and Admiral Rudolf Montecuccoli.

Lothringen was sent into the Little Belt in February 1912 to assist merchant vessels threatened by heavy sea ice and bad weather. In mid-1912, due to the Agadir Crisis, the summer cruise was confined to the Baltic, to avoid exposing the fleet during the period of heightened tension with Britain and France. Lothringen visited Memel from 3 to 7 August that year. On 30 January 1913, Holtzendorff was relieved as the fleet commander, owing in large part to Kaiser Wilhelm II's displeasure with his strategic vision. In late August, the squadron steamed through the Kaiser Wilhelm Canal at the start of the autumn maneuvers to reach the island of Helgoland; the voyage through the canal was notable because the canal had been closed for over a year while it was enlarged to allow the passage of larger dreadnought battleships. Further training exercises were conducted in November.

Lothringen participated in ceremonies at Sonderburg on 2 May 1914 to celebrate the 50th anniversary of the Battle of Dybbøl of the Second Schleswig War; she was joined by her sister ships Hessen and Preussen, the battleship Schlesien, and the armored cruiser Blücher. The ship was present during the fleet cruise to Norway in July 1914, which was cut short by the July Crisis following the assassination of Austrian Archduke Franz Ferdinand the month before and during the rise in international tensions it caused. On 25 July the ship's crew was made aware of Austria-Hungary's ultimatum to Serbia; Lothringen left Norway to rendezvous with the rest of the fleet the following day. The ship had been scheduled to be removed from service on 30 July, but the outbreak of war interrupted that plan and she remained in service.

=== World War I ===
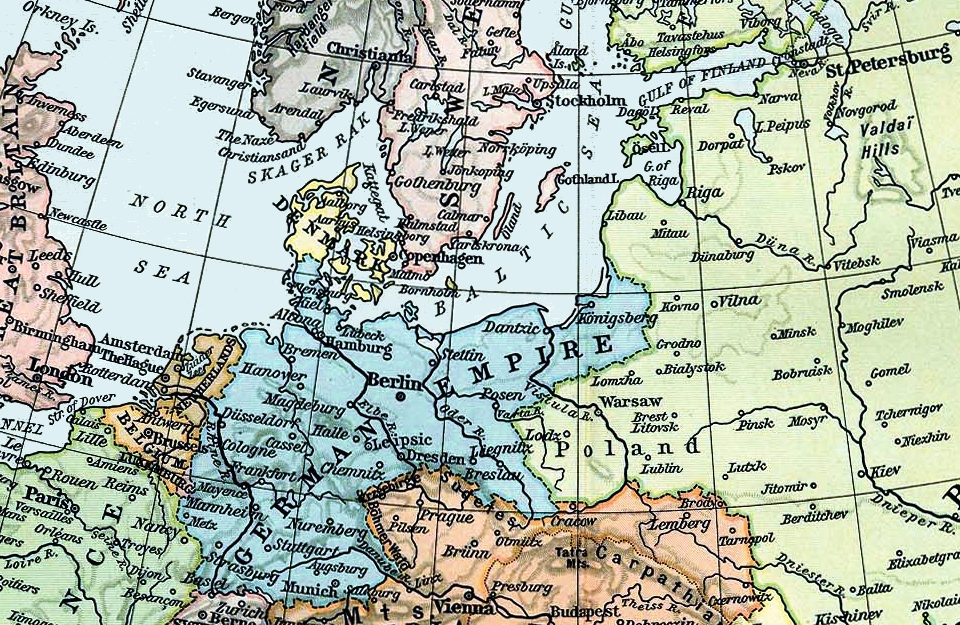
Map of the North and Baltic Seas in 1911

After the outbreak of war in July 1914, the German command deployed II Squadron in the German Bight to defend Germany's coast from a major attack from the Royal Navy that the Germans presumed was imminent. Lothringen and her squadron mates were stationed in the mouth of the Elbe to support the vessels on patrol duty in the Bight. Once it became clear that the British would not attack the High Seas Fleet, the Germans began a series of operations designed to lure out a portion of the numerically superior British Grand Fleet and destroy it. By achieving a rough equality of forces, the Germans hoped that their fleet could then force a decisive battle in the southern portion of the North Sea.

The first such operation in which the High Seas Fleet participated was the raid on Scarborough, Hartlepool, and Whitby on 15–16 December 1914. The main fleet acted as distant support for Konteradmiral (Rear Admiral) Franz von Hipper's battlecruiser squadron while it raided the coastal towns. On the evening of 15 December, the fleet came to within 10 nmi (19 km; 12 mi) of an isolated squadron of six British battleships. However, skirmishes between the rival destroyer screens in the darkness convinced the German fleet commander, VAdm Friedrich von Ingenohl, that the entire Grand Fleet was deployed before him. Under orders from Wilhelm II to avoid battle if victory was not certain, Ingenohl broke off the engagement and turned the battlefleet back towards Germany.

In February 1916, the Admiralstab (Admiralty Staff) decided that the pre-dreadnoughts were no longer effective warships in the face of more modern vessels, and so the ships of II Squadron were gradually removed from the High Seas Fleet and reassigned solely to coastal defense duties in the Danish Straits and the German Bight. Accordingly, Lothringen was the first vessel of the unit to be withdrawn, on 19 February, to have anti-torpedo nets installed to protect her from submarines in the confined waters of the Danish Straits. Additionally, she was in poor condition by that time and required extensive repairs. After these were completed, she returned to service on 14 July and replaced Hessen in the straits in late August.

Lothringen served in a guard ship role in the straits until September 1917, when she was replaced by the battleship Hannover. Lothringen proceeded to Wilhelmshaven, where she was decommissioned on 15 September. Over the next month, she was disarmed and converted into a training ship. She began service in this role on 16 October with a reduced crew. In addition to training new crews, she was used to train engine-room personnel. Lothringen remained in service until the end of the war on 11 November 1918. From 17 November to 16 December, she served as a headquarters ship for IV Battle Squadron.

=== Post-war career ===
Following the German defeat in World War I, the German Navy was reorganized as the Reichsmarine according to the Treaty of Versailles. The new navy was permitted to retain eight pre-dreadnought battleships for coastal defense under Article 181, two of which would be in reserve. Lothringen was among those ships chosen to remain on active service with the newly reformed Reichsmarine. Like her sister Preussen, Lothringen was converted into a parent ship for F-type minesweepers at the Reichsmarinewerft in Wilhelmshaven in 1919; the ship was disarmed and platforms for holding the minesweepers were installed.

Lothringen served in this capacity, carrying fourteen of the F-boats from the 10th Half-Flotilla, until the minesweeping work required by the Treaty of Versailles was completed. On 2 March 1920, the ship was placed in reserve and remained out of service until 24 March 1931, when Reichspräsident (President of the Realm) Paul von Hindenburg issued an order to dispose of Lothringen. She was accordingly stricken from the naval register on 31 March. The Reichsmarine then sold her, minus her armor plating, to ship breakers that year for 269,650 Reichsmarks. Lothringen was subsequently broken up for scrap; the location of her disposal is uncertain. According to naval historian Erich Gröner, Lothringen was scrapped by Blohm & Voss in Hamburg, but the historians Hans Hildebrand, Albert Röhr, and Hans-Otto Steinmetz state that she was broken up in Wilhelmshaven.
