= Braunschweig-class battleship =

Battleship class of the German Imperial Navy

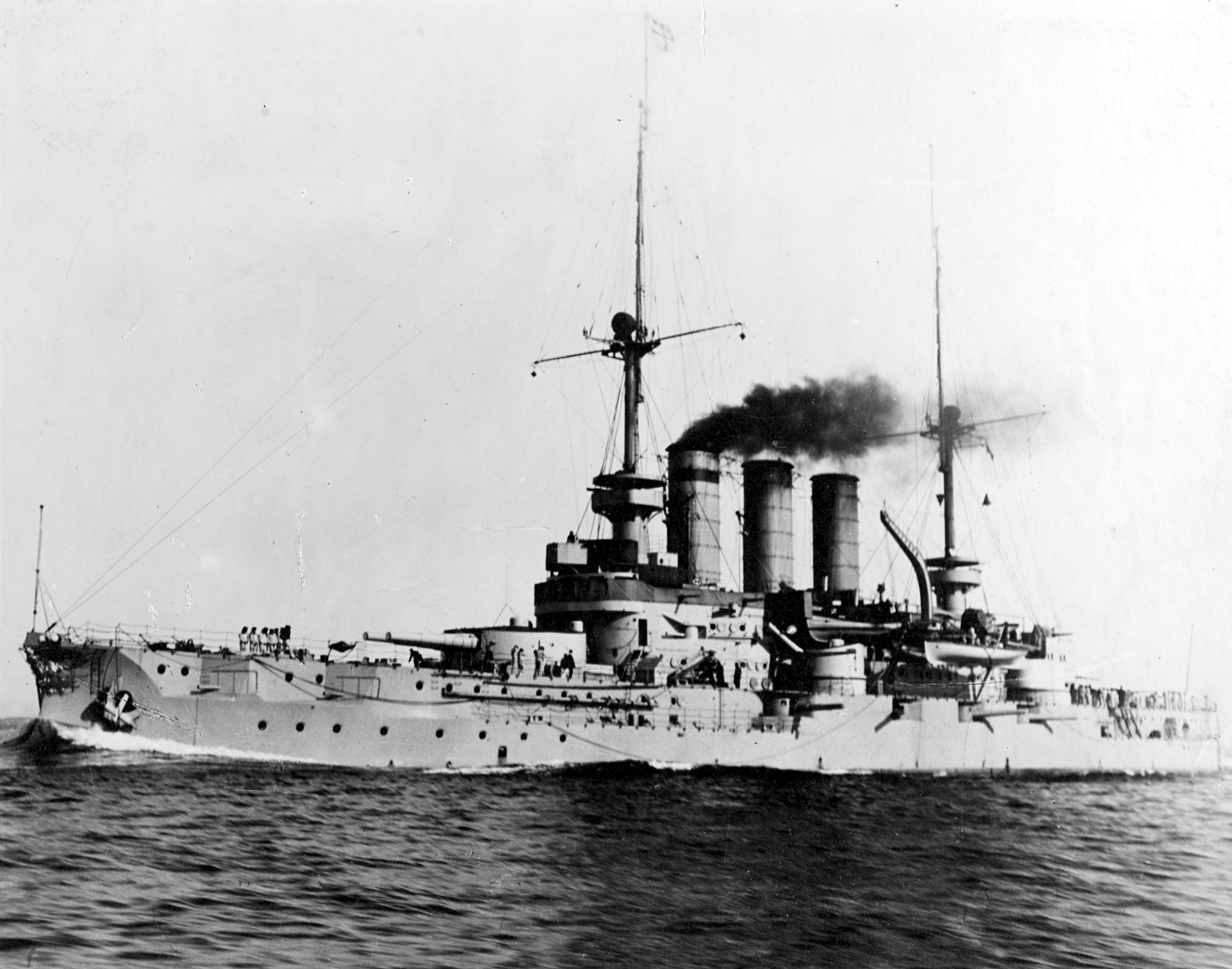
- Preussen in 1907

Class overview
- Name: Braunschweig class
- Builders: Friedrich Krupp Germaniawerft (2); Schichau-Werke (2); AG Vulcan Stettin (1)
- Operators: Imperial German Navy; Reichsmarine; Kriegsmarine; Soviet Navy
- Preceded by: Wittelsbach class
- Succeeded by: Deutschland class
- Built: 1901–1906
- In commission: 1904–1960
- Completed: 5
- Scrapped: 5

General characteristics
- Type: Pre-dreadnought battleship
- Displacement: Normal: 13,208 t (12,999 long tons); Full load: 14,394 t (14,167 long tons)
- Length: 127.7 m (419 ft) loa
- Beam: 22.2 m (72 ft 10 in)
- Draft: 8.1–8.16 m (26 ft 7 in – 26 ft 9 in)
- Installed power: 14 × boilers; 16,000 PS (15,781 ihp; 11,768 kW)
- Propulsion: 3 × triple-expansion steam engines; 3 × screw propellers
- Speed: 18 knots (33 km/h; 21 mph)
- Range: 5,200 nmi (9,600 km; 6,000 mi) at 10 knots (19 km/h; 12 mph)
- Complement: 35 officers; 708 enlisted men
- Armament: 2 × 2 – 28 cm (11 in) SK L/40 guns; 14 × 17 cm (6.7 in) SK L/40 guns; 14 × 8.8 cm (3.5 in) SK L/35 guns; 6 × 45 cm (17.7 in) torpedo tubes
- Armor: Belt: 225 mm (8.9 in); Turrets: 250 mm; Deck: 40 mm (1.6 in); Conning tower: 300 mm (11.8 in)

The Braunschweig-class battleships were a group of five pre-dreadnought battleships of the German Kaiserliche Marine (Imperial Navy) built in the early 1900s. They were the first class of battleships authorized under the Second Naval Law, a major naval expansion program. The class comprised five ships—Braunschweig, Elsass, Hessen, Preussen, and Lothringen—and they were an improvement over the preceding Wittelsbach class. The Braunschweigs mounted a more powerful armament of 28 cm (11 in) and 17 cm (6.7 in) guns (compared to 24 cm (9.4 in) and 15 cm (5.9 in) guns of the Wittelsbachs). Less than two years after the first members of the class entered service, the ships were rendered obsolescent by the British all-big-gun battleship Dreadnought, which curtailed their careers.

During their early careers, the five ships served in II Battle Squadron, with Preussen its flagship. The fleet was occupied primarily with routine peacetime training and foreign visits. In 1912, Braunschweig was placed in reserve and she was joined the following year by Elsass. Lothringen and Hessen were slated to be decommissioned in 1914, but the outbreak of World War I in July prevented this and they remained in service with the High Seas Fleet. They and Preussen took part in the fleet operations in the first two years of the war, while Braunschweig and Elsass went to the Baltic with IV Battle Squadron, where they eventually saw combat with the Russian battleship Slava during the Battle of the Gulf of Riga in August 1915. Hessen took part in the Battle of Jutland in May 1916 and saw limited combat with British battlecruisers late in the battle. All five of the ships were withdrawn from service starting in 1916, thereafter being used in subsidiary roles, including as barracks and training ships.

After the war, the five Braunschweigs were among the vessels that the new Reichsmarine was permitted to retain by the Treaty of Versailles. Lothringen and Preussen were converted into parent ships for minesweepers to clear the minefields in the North Sea that had been laid during the war, but the other three were modernized in the early 1920s and served with the fleet into the 1930s. Braunschweig and Elsass were eventually stricken from the register in 1931, and along with Lothringen and Preussen were thereafter broken up. Hessen remained in service until late 1934, when she was decommissioned and converted into a radio-controlled target ship, a role she filled through World War II. Ceded as a war prize to the Soviet Union, she was commissioned as Tsel and used as a target until 1960 when she was scrapped.

== Design ==
With the passage of the Second Naval Law under the direction of Vizeadmiral (VAdm—Vice Admiral) Alfred von Tirpitz in 1900, funding was allocated for a new class of battleships to succeed the Wittelsbach-class ships authorized under the 1898 Naval Law. The previous law had called for a total strength of nineteen battleships by 1 April 1904, which was reached with the Wittelsbach class, but the new law increased the projected battle fleet to a total of thirty-eight. The Braunschweig class was the first group of battleships built under this new plan, and they marked a significant advance in combat power over earlier German battleships.

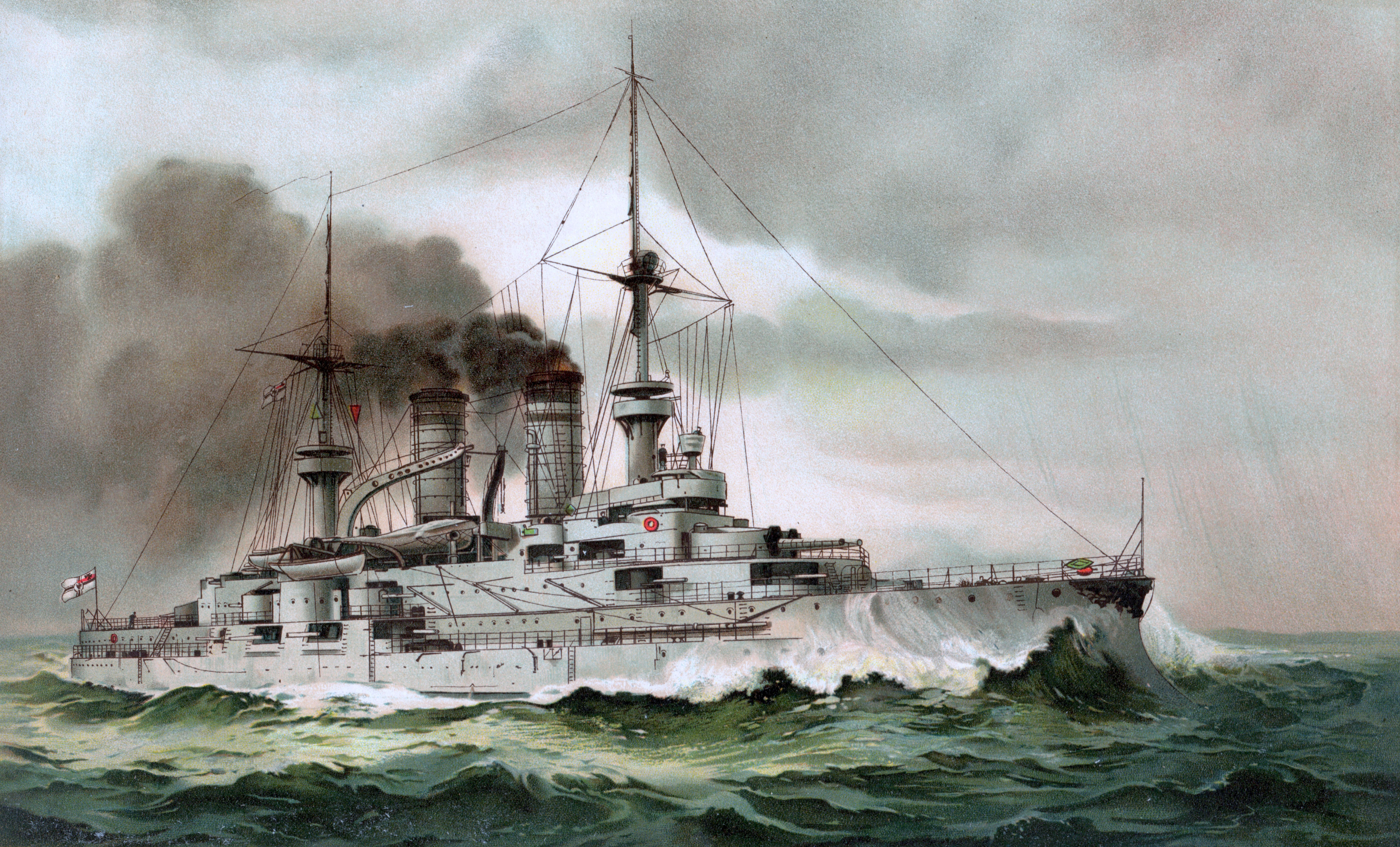
Lithograph of Zähringen of the Wittelsbach class; note the arrangement of the main battery guns atop the secondary battery

Discussions between the Design Department of the Reichsmarineamt (Imperial Navy Office) and other elements of the naval command on the new class had begun in 1899, before the law had been passed and before work on the Wittelsbachs had even begun. The most pressing issue to be settled was the caliber of the main battery. The Wittelsbach-class ships were armed with 24 cm (9.4 in) guns, far smaller than the standard in most other navies, which was 30.5 cm (12 in) caliber. The 24 cm guns were, however, the largest weapons for which Krupp, the supplier of naval artillery to the Kaiserliche Marine (Imperial Navy), had developed quick-firing technology. The German naval command typically favored high rates of fire rather than heavy shells, on the principal that a flurry of shells would wreck the guns and superstructure of enemy battleships faster than powerful but slow-firing guns. But by the time design work on the Braunschweig class began, Krupp had developed a quick-firing 28 cm (11 in) gun, and so the naval command decided to adopt it for the new ships.

With the decision made to mount the 28 cm gun, the next issue was the arrangement of the guns. Previous designs had carried the 24 cm guns in the superstructure, directly above casemates for the secondary battery guns, but the designers believed the greater muzzle blast effects from the 28 cm guns would make those casemates unworkable. Two solutions were proposed, both of which involved lowering the main battery turrets to the upper deck level. The first involved placing all of the secondary guns in an armored battery at the main deck level; these guns would have been in individual pivot mounts in a series of casemates clustered amidships. The second option arranged the guns in a mix of turrets on the upper deck and in a smaller battery in the main deck. The design staff ultimately settled on the second option, with four guns in turrets and eight in the casemate battery.

At the same time, as many countries' navies improved the armor protection of their battleships, they were also increasing the caliber of their secondary batteries to counter the heavier armor, such as the American Connecticut-class battleships that had a heavy secondary battery of 7 in (178 mm) and 8 in (203 mm) guns. The German design staff followed both trends by increasing the secondary battery for the Braunschweig design from 15 cm (5.9 in) to 17 cm (6.7 in) guns. And the armor layout was improved compared to the Wittelsbachs, the primary changes being increasing the height of the belt armor (to prevent it from being submerged at full load) and increasing the thickness of the armor protecting the secondary battery casemates. The design staff considered increasing the anti-torpedo boat guns from 8.8 cm (3.5 in) to 10.5 cm (4.1 in), but decided against the change because the increased weight would have necessitated reducing the number of guns. The heavier shells would have also reduced the rate of fire.

The British battleship HMS Dreadnought—armed with ten 12-inch guns—was commissioned in December 1906, less than two years after the first Braunschweig-class ships entered service. Dreadnought's revolutionary design rendered every capital ship of the German navy obsolete, including the Braunschweigs. Also, the 17 cm guns proved to be something of a disappointment in service, since the larger shells were significantly heavier and thus harder to load manually, which reduced their rate of fire.

=== General characteristics and machinery ===
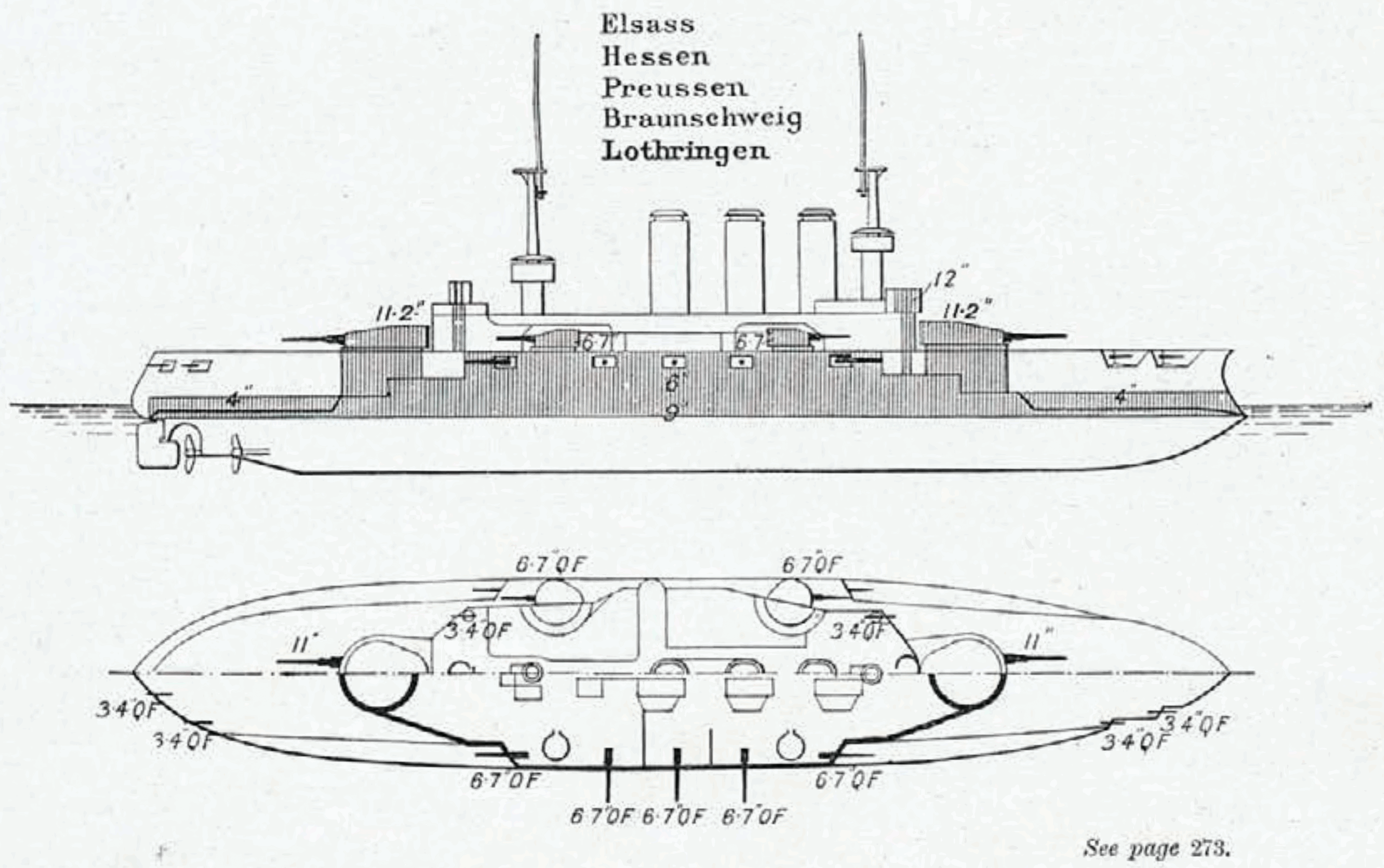
Plan and profile drawing of the Braunschweig class, showing arrangement of the ships' armament and armor scheme

The Braunschweig-class ships were 126 meters (413 ft 5 in) long at the waterline, and 127.7 m (419 ft) overall. The ships had a beam of 22.2 m (72 ft 10 in), and a draft of 8.1–8.16 m (26 ft 7 in – 26 ft 9 in). The beam was constrained by logistical considerations, as it was the widest that could be accommodated by the locks at the entrance to the Kaiserliche Werft (Imperial Shipyard) in Wilhelmshaven. The ships had thirteen watertight compartments and a double bottom that extended for 60 percent of the length of the hull. The ships displaced 13,208 t (12,999 long tons) at their designed weight, and 14,394 t (14,167 long tons) at a full load. The ships were fitted with a pair of heavy military masts that carried searchlights.

Steering was controlled with a single rudder. The ships were described as good sea-boats, but were prone to heavy pitching. The ships were responsive and had a tight turning radius at low speed, but at hard rudder of 12 degrees, the ships lost up to 70 percent speed. The ships had a crew of 35 officers and 708 men normally, and when serving as a squadron flagship, they had an additional 13 officers and 66 men. The ships carried a number of smaller boats aboard, including two picket boats, two launches, a pinnace (later removed), two cutters, two yawls, and two dinghies. The boats were handled by two large goose-necked cranes located on either side of the rear funnel.

The ships of the Braunschweig-class were propelled by three-shaft triple-expansion steam engines that were rated at 16,000 metric horsepower (15,781 ihp; 11,768 kW). The triple expansion engines were powered by eight Marine-type boilers and six cylindrical boilers, all of which burned coal; these were trunked into three funnels amidships. Three funnels were adopted because in earlier vessels, the two-funnel arrangement tended to obstruct views from the bridge, and by splitting the smoke into three funnels instead of two, the funnels could be thinner and thus less obtrusive. At some point after 1915, oil-firing capability was added to supplement the coal-fired boilers. (Note: Due to the wartime situation, Germany had limited access to high-quality coal, but was able to acquire lower-grade coal for its ships. The higher quality coal was generally reserved for the smaller craft, whose crews were less able to clean the boilers at the increased rate demanded by the low-quality coal. As a result, German capital ships were often supplied with poor coal, in the knowledge that their larger crews were better able to perform the increased maintenance. After 1915, the practice of spraying oil onto the low-quality coal was introduced to increase the burn rate.) The two outer propellers were three-bladed, and 4.8 m (15 ft 9 in) in diameter, while the center screw was four-bladed and 4.5 m (14 ft 9 in) in diameter.

The ships' top speed was rated at 18 knots (33 km/h; 21 mph). During trials, however, the engines produced between 16,478 and 16,980 metric horsepower (16,253 and 16,748 ihp; 12,120 and 12,489 kW), and a top speed between 18.2 and 18.7 knots (33.7 and 34.6 km/h; 20.9 and 21.5 mph). The ships of the class could steam 5,200 nautical miles (9,600 km; 6,000 mi) at a cruising speed of 10 knots (19 km/h; 12 mph), with the exception of Hessen. Hessen suffered from unstable steering, which increased fuel consumption and shortened her operational range to 4,530 nmi (8,390 km) at 10 knots (19 km/h; 12 mph). The first two ships—Braunschweig and Elsass—had four generators that produced 230 kW (74 V), while three following ships—Hessen, Preussen, and Lothringen—had four turbo-generators that provided 260 kW (110 V).

=== Armament and armor ===
Profile drawing of the 28 cm SK L/40 gun in the naval mounting

Their main armament was increased from previous designs, but was still weaker than contemporary foreign battleships; the German Navy had a tendency to emphasize rapidity of fire rather than weight of shell, and smaller guns could generally be fired faster than larger ones. The main armament comprised four 28 cm SK L/40 (Note: In Imperial German Navy gun nomenclature, "SK" (Schnelladekanone) denotes that the gun is quick firing, while the L/40 denotes the length of the gun. In this case, the L/40 gun is 40 caliber, meaning that the length of the gun is 40 times its bore.) quick-firing guns in hydraulically operated twin turrets. The turrets were placed on the centerline, one forward and one aft. The C/01 turrets allowed the guns to depress to −4 degrees, and elevate to +30 degrees, which enabled a maximum range of 18,800 meters (61,700 ft). The guns fired 240-kilogram (530 lb) shells at a muzzle velocity of 820 meters per second (2,700 ft/s). The ships carried a total of 340 shells, 85 per gun.

The secondary battery consisted of fourteen 17 cm SK L/40 quick-firing guns, four of which were mounted in single turrets amidships, with the remaining ten in casemates around the superstructure. The guns fired 64-kilogram (141 lb) shells at a muzzle velocity of 850 meters per second (2,800 ft/s). These guns were chosen as they used the largest shell that could be reasonably handled without machinery. The turret-mounted guns could be elevated to 30 degrees, for a maximum range of 16,900 m (18,500 yd), while the casemated guns could only elevate to 22 degrees, and had a correspondingly lower range of 14,500 m (15,900 yd). These guns had a total of 1,820 shells, for 130 rounds per gun. To transit the Kiel Canal, the three central 17 cm casemated guns on each side had to be withdrawn into their housings, as they were unable to train fully flush with the sides of the ships. With the guns fully emplaced, the ships would have been too wide to fit in the canal.

The ships also had fourteen 8.8 cm SK L/35 quick-firing guns in casemates along the length of the ship. The guns fired 7 kg (15.4 lb) shells at a muzzle velocity of 770 m/s (2,526 ft/s), and could be elevated to 25 degrees for a maximum range of 9,090 m (9,940 yd). They were also armed with six 45 cm (17.7 in) torpedo tubes, with a total of 16 torpedoes. One tube was in the bow, two were on each broadside, and the final tube was in the stern.

The ships were protected with Krupp armor. The main armored belt was 225 mm (8.9 in) thick in the central portion of the ship where it protected the ammunition magazines and propulsion machinery spaces. The deck armor was 40 mm (1.6 in) thick on the horizontal; its edges sloped down to connect to the lower edge of the belt to protect from shells that passed over the belt. The thickness of the slopes ranged from 140 mm (5.5 in) fore and aft and 75 mm (2.95 in) amidships, where the upper belt armor afforded another layer of protection. Above the main belt, the upper belt of 140 mm steel extended between the fore and aft main-gun turrets. Another strake of armor that was 140 mm thick protected the casemate guns at the main deck level. The casemate guns themselves received 70 mm (2.8 in) gun shields. The main battery turrets had 250 mm sides and 50 mm (1.97 in) thick roofs, while the secondary turrets had 150 mm (5.9 in) thick sides. The sides of the forward conning tower were 300 mm (11.8 in) thick and the roof was 50 mm thick, while the aft conning tower received significantly less protection, with 150 mm thick sides and a 30 mm (1.2 in) roof.

== Ships ==
Braunschweig at her launching

Construction data
Ship	Contract name	Builder	Laid down	Launched	Commissioned
Braunschweig	H	Germaniawerft, Kiel	21 October 1901	20 December 1902	15 October 1904
Elsass	J	Schichau-Werke, Danzig	26 May 1901	26 May 1903	29 November 1904
Hessen	L	Germaniawerft, Kiel	15 March 1902	18 September 1903	19 September 1905
Preussen	K	AG Vulcan, Stettin	April 1902	30 October 1903	12 July 1905
Lothringen	M	Schichau-Werke, Danzig	1 December 1902	27 May 1904	18 May 1906

== Service history ==
Members of the Braunschweig and Deutschland classes of II Battle Squadron in the North Sea

The ships' peacetime careers consisted of routine fleet training. Squadron and fleet training typically took place in April and May, a major fleet cruise generally followed in June and July, after which the fleet assembled for the annual fleet maneuvers in late August and September. The major fleet cruises typically went to Norwegian waters in company with Kaiser Wilhelm II's yacht, though in 1908 and 1909, the fleet embarked on long-distance cruises out into the Atlantic, making visits to mainland Spain, the Canary Islands, and the Azores, Portugal. Interspersed in this routine were foreign visits, such as in November 1905, when Braunschweig carried Prince Heinrich to Norway for the coronation of Haakon VII of Norway, and February 1906 when Preussen carried Wilhelm II to Denmark for the funeral of King Christian IX. The ships were also involved in accidents; in 1911, Hessen collided with the Danish steamer SS Askesund and sank her, and in March 1912, Elsass accidentally rammed and sank the merchant ship Pollux. Throughout this period, Preussen served as the flagship of II Battle Squadron.

The ship's active careers were very short as a result of the dreadnought revolution; Braunschweig and Elsass were reduced to reserve in 1912 and 1913, respectively, though Lothringen, Hessen, and Preussen were still in active service in mid-1914. Lothringen was to be reduced to reserve in July and Preussen was slated to be decommissioned at the end of the year, but the July Crisis that followed the assassination of Archduke Franz Ferdinand in June cancelled that plan. The fleet was on its summer cruise to Norway during the crisis, and word of the Austro-Hungarian ultimatum to Serbia forced the ships to return home early to prepare for the coming conflict.

=== World War I ===
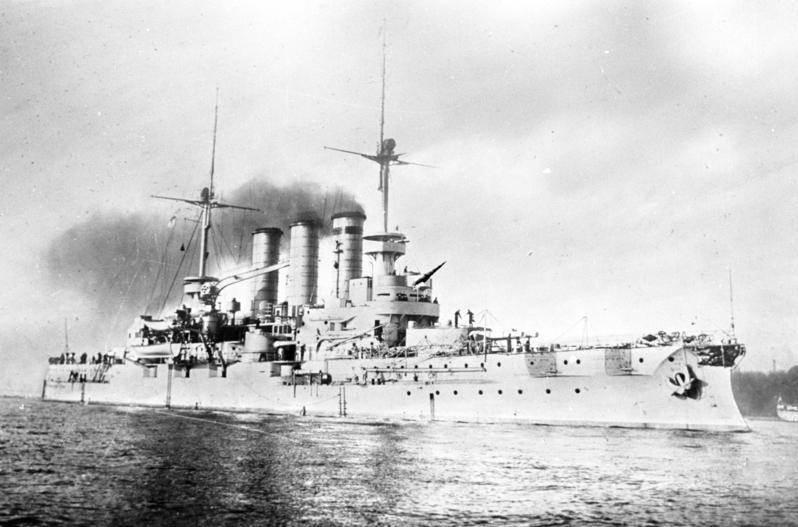
One of the Braunschweig-class battleships

At the start of World War I, Braunschweig and Elsass were reactivated and assigned to IV Battle Squadron under the command of Vice Admiral Ehrhard Schmidt, tasked with coastal defense duties. The squadron conducted several sorties into the Baltic Sea to patrol for Russian warships but it saw no action. The ships were also used to guard the mouth of the Elbe in the North Sea in the first year of the war. Braunschweig and Elsass participated in the early portion of the Battle of the Gulf of Riga in August 1915, where they kept the Russian pre-dreadnought Slava at bay while a Russian minefield in the Irben Strait was cleared, but the Russian forces put up a strong defense. Schmidt decided to withdraw his forces when it became apparent that the mine-clearing had taken too long, and there was not sufficient daylight left for the minelayer Deutschland to lay a minefield of its own in Moon Sound to block the northern entrance to the gulf. Following the cancellation of the operation, the squadron saw little activity before being disbanded in December.

In the meantime, the other three ships were still serving in II Battle Squadron, where they participated in the fleet sorties conducted in the first two years of the war. This series of operations culminated in the Battle of Jutland on 31 May – 1 June 1916; by that time, only Hessen was still on active service with the squadron. Preussen was on rotation as the guard ship in the Danish Straits (and had been replaced as flagship by the battleship Deutschland) and Lothringen was in poor condition and in dire need of repair. Hessen saw limited action at Jutland, coming into contact with heavy British ships once. This encounter came late on 31 May, when Hessen and the other pre-dreadnoughts of II Battle Squadron briefly engaged Vice Admiral David Beatty's 1st Battlecruiser Squadron, in doing so covering the withdrawal of the battered German battlecruisers under the command of Franz von Hipper. The loss of the pre-dreadnought Pommern during the battle highlighted the vulnerability of the older battleships, and coupled with their slow speed, convinced the German naval command to withdraw them from front-line service. Preussen, Lothringen, and Hessen continued as guard ships in the Baltic in the aftermath of Jutland.

Starting in 1916, the ships of the Braunschweig class began to be withdrawn from active service, primarily because of manpower shortages. Elsass was reduced to a barracks ship based in Kiel in July, and Hessen was decommissioned and disarmed in December; she thereafter became a depot ship based in Brunsbüttel in 1917. Braunschweig was converted into a training ship, and on 20 August, was reduced to a barracks ship, also in Kiel. Preussen became a depot ship in Wilhelmshaven also in 1917. Lothringen continued her guard ship duties until September 1917, when she too was withdrawn from service, thereafter being used as an engineer training ship in Wilhelmshaven. Starting in 1916, guns removed from these ships were used by the Imperial Army as railway guns; one of these guns was captured by the Australian Army and is preserved as the Amiens Gun at the Australian War Memorial in Canberra, Australia.

=== Post-World War I ===
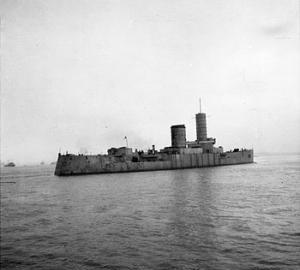
Hessen as a target ship in 1946

After the war, all of Germany's powerful dreadnoughts had either been scuttled in Scapa Flow or ceded to the Allies as war prizes, so the Braunschweig-class battleships were recommissioned into the newly reorganized Reichsmarine. The Treaty of Versailles specifically stated in Article 181 that the Reichsmarine would be permitted to retain eight battleships of the "Lothringen or Deutschland types", six of which could be kept in commission. Three of the ships—Braunschweig, Elsass, and Hessen—saw active duty with the fleet while the other two vessels—Preussen and Lothringen—were instead converted into parent ships for minesweepers, since Germany was required by the Treaty of Versailles to clear the extensive minefields that had been laid in the North Sea during the war. Those two ships were disarmed and modified to carry the minesweepers, but Preussen proved to be top-heavy and saw little actual use. Lothringen remained in service until 1920, by which time the minesweeping work had been completed, and she was laid up in reserve.

Braunschweig was modernized in 1919–1920 and served in the Reichsmarine from 1921 to 1926, at which point she was withdrawn from active duty. During this period, she served as the flagship of the Marinestation der Nordsee (Naval Station of the North Sea) and later the Linienschiffsdivision (Battleship Division). Elsass was also rebuilt in the early 1920s and thereafter saw active duty in the fleet from 1924 until 25 February 1930, at which point she was removed from active service. Hessen returned to service in 1925. Throughout the 1920s and early 1930s, the fleet conducted a similar training routine to that of the pre-war period, including cruises into the Atlantic in the 1920s. On 31 May 1931, Braunschweig, Elsass, and Lothringen were stricken from the naval register. The first two vessels were converted into hulks at Wilhelmshaven and eventually scrapped, while Lothringen was simply broken up immediately. Hessen remained in service until late 1934, by which time the new Deutschland class of panzerschiffe (armored ships) had begun to enter service.

Hessen was thereafter converted into a target ship. The work involved cutting away most of the superstructure, removing the armament, and replacing the old propulsion machinery with steam turbines. Additionally, equipment to allow the ship to be operated via radio control was installed. Conversion work lasted from 31 March 1935 to 1 April 1937, when she was recommissioned as a target. She served in this capacity through 1945; during World War II, she was also occasionally used as an icebreaker to clear paths in the Baltic. After the war, she was ceded to the Soviet Union and renamed Tsel. The Soviets also used the ship as a target and eventually scrapped the vessel in the 1960s. When Preussen was being dismantled in the 1930s, a 63 m (207 ft) length of her hull was retained for use as a target. The hulk was nicknamed "SMS Vierkant" ("SMS Rectangle") and remained in use through World War II until Allied bombers attacked and sank it in April 1945.
