= SS Pollux (1883) =

History
- Name: Pollux
- Builder: Lindholmens Varv
- Completed: 1883
- Fate: Sunk in collision, 23 March 1912

General characteristics
- Tonnage: 921 GRT
- Length: 59.9 m (197 ft) lpp
- Beam: 8.8 m (29 ft)
- Propulsion: compound steam engine

SS Pollux was a Swedish cargo steamship built by Lindholmens Varv of Gothenburg in 1883. The vessel was propelled by one compound steam engine. She measured 921 GRT, with a length of 59.9 m (197 ft) between perpendiculars and a beam of 8.8 m (29 ft). Pollux was built for Trelleborgs Ångfartygs Nya A/B of Trelleborg and, after 17 years service, was sold in 1900 to Rederi A/B Avena of Uddevalla.

On 23 March 1912, while traveling from Uddevalla to London in the Skagerrak, carrying a load of general cargo, she accidentally collided near Hanstholm, Denmark with the German battleship Elsass in heavy fog. Pollux was badly damaged and sank, though her crew was taken off by the German vessel. The loss of Pollux was one of the reasons for the voluntary liquidation in 1912 of Rederi A/B Avena, which had been founded in 1874 by William Thorburn & Sons to ship their own goods from Uddevalla to London. The dissolution could not be completed until 1926, due to delays in the process for compensation against the German state.
