= 28 cm SK L/40 gun =

28 cm SK L/40
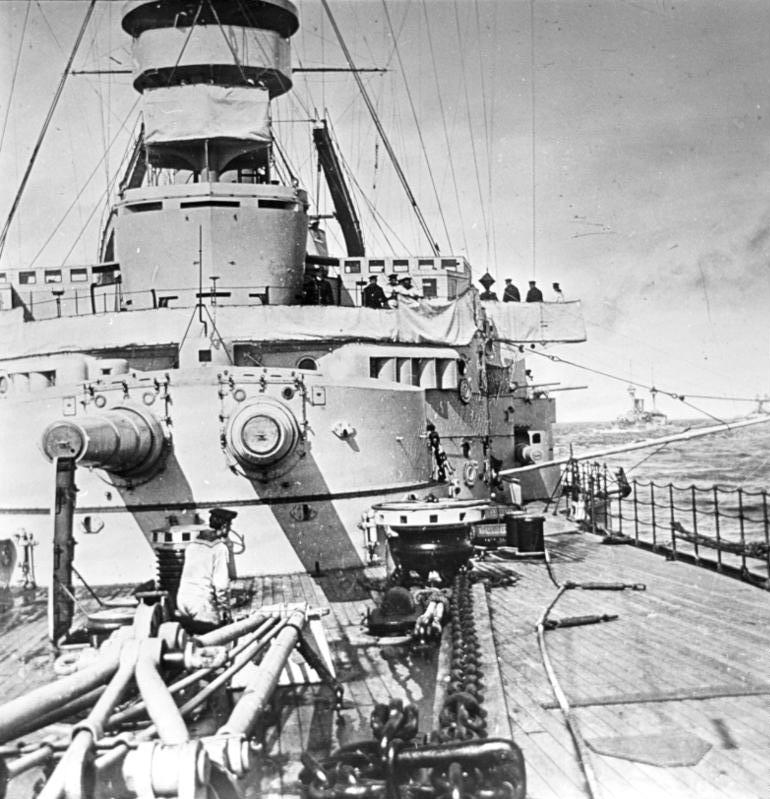
- Forward Drh.L. C/01 turret of the Deutschland
- Type: Naval gun Coast-defence gun Railway gun
- Place of origin: German Empire

Service history
- In service: 1904–1945.
- Used by: German Empire; Ottoman Empire; Nazi Germany
- Wars: World War I World War II

Production history
- Designer: Krupp
- Designed: 1902
- Manufacturer: Krupp
- Produced: 1902?–1906? (Note: Exact dates of production are not known with any certainty, even if any guns were built after the last of the Deutschland-class ships was launched in 1906. Chesneau and Kolesnik, pp. 247–249.)

Specifications
- Mass: 45.3 metric tons (44.6 long tons; 49.9 short tons)
- Length: 11.2 meters (36 ft 9 in)
- Barrel length: 10.401 meters (34 ft 1.5 in) (bore length)
- Shell: separate-loading, cased charge
- Shell weight: 240–284 kilograms (529–626 lb)
- Caliber: 283 millimeters (11.1 in)
- Breech: horizontal sliding-wedge
- Muzzle velocity: 740 to 820 m/s (2,400 to 2,700 ft/s)

The 28 cm SK L/40 (Note: SK - Schnelladekanone (quick loading cannon); L - Länge in Kaliber (length in caliber)) was a German naval gun that was used in World War I and World War II as the main armament of the Braunschweig- and Deutschland-class pre-dreadnoughts.

== Naval guns ==
Profile drawing of the 28 cm SK L/40 gun in the naval mounting

The 28 cm SK L/40 gun weighed 45.3 tonnes (44.6 long tons; 49.9 short tons), had an overall length of 11.2 meters (36 ft 9 in) and a bore length of 10.401 meters (34 ft 1.5 in). Although designated as 28 cm (11 in), its actual caliber was 28.3 centimeters (11.1 in). It used Krupp's horizontal sliding-block, or "wedge", as it is sometimes referred to, breech design rather than the interrupted screw commonly used in heavy guns of other nations. This required that the propellant charge be loaded in a metal case (usually brass) which provides obturation, or sealing of the breech, to prevent escape of the expanding propellant gas. The 28 cm SK L/40 was the last large German naval gun to load all its propellant in a single case; later guns required a fore charge in addition to the main charge in the cartridge case.

The C/01 turret was used by the Braunschweig- and Deutschland-class battleships, one twin gun turret at each end. Its guns could depress 4° and elevate 30° and could traverse about 150° on either side of the centerline. It could fire a 240 kg (530 lb) L/2.6 armor-piercing shell to a maximum range of 18,830 meters (20,590 yd) at maximum elevation. These ships stowed 85 rounds per gun. The rate of fire for both types of turrets was about 2 rounds per minute.

The Treaty of Versailles allowed the Germans to retain four pre-dreadnoughts, although only two, Schleswig-Holstein and Schlesien, were rearmed with their original 28 cm SK L/40 guns. The former fired the first shots of World War II when she began bombarding Polish defenses on the Westerplatte on 1 September 1939 while the latter also participated in the Polish Campaign. However both ships were relegated to training duties shortly afterwards.

== Coast defense guns ==
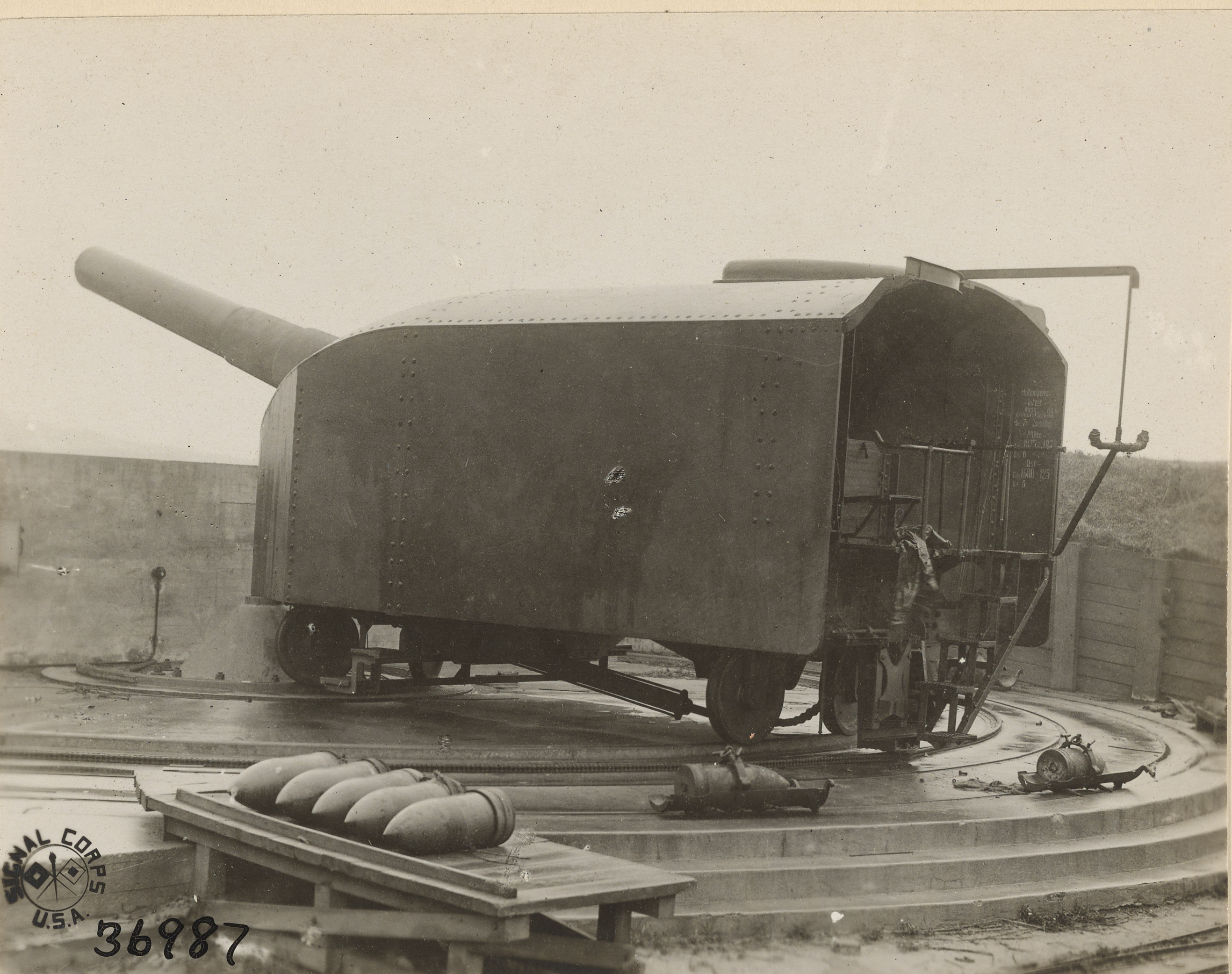
A SK L/40 gun on a coastal defense mount in Belgium

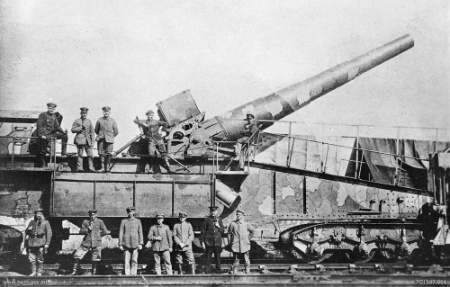
Side view of a "Bruno" and its crew in 1918

Some of the 28 cm SK L/40 guns were transferred to the German Army from the Navy (Kaiserliche Marine) when the pre-dreadnoughts began to be disarmed and relegated to training duties in 1916 after the Battle of Jutland had proved that they were not suitable for contemporary naval combat. One obvious change made for land service was the placement of a large counterweight just forward of the trunnions to counteract the preponderance of weight towards the breech. This, although heavy, was simpler than adding equilibrators to perform the same function. It was fitted with a hydro-pneumatic system to absorb the recoil from firing and to return the gun to its firing position, ready for the next round. The first four guns were placed in Bettungsschiessgerüst (firing platform) (BSG) mountings in 1917 for coast defense duties as part of "Batterie Graf Spee" on the island of Wangerooge. These were a semi-portable mount that could be emplaced anywhere after several weeks of labor to prepare the position. It rotated on a pivot at the front of the mount and the rear was supported by rollers resting on a semicircular rail and was sometimes equipped with a gun shield. The gun's rate of fire in these mounts was about one round per five minutes.

During World War II only seven guns were used as coast defense duties on BSG mountings. The four guns of "Batterie Graf Spee" had survived World War I and were transferred to Brest, France in 1940.

== Railway guns ==
Approximately twenty other guns from the battleships were put on railroad mountings as the 28 cm SK L/40 "Bruno" and used as railway guns. A number were kept by the Kaiserliche Marine and used on coastal defense duties, but the others were used by the Heer in more traditional roles as long-range heavy artillery. Surviving weapons were used by the Germans in World War II as coast defense duties.

== Ammunition ==
Before and during World War I, the gun used about 73 kg (161 lb) of RP C/12 (Rohr-Pulver – tube powder) propellant that was a mix of nitrocellulose, nitroglycerin and small amounts of other additives with a calorific value of 950 and an uncooled explosion temperature of 2975 kelvins. In World War II, it was replaced by RP C/38 that substituted diethylene glycol dinitrite for the nitroglycerine which had a calorific value of 810 and an uncooled explosion temperature of 2495 K. This had the virtue of being harder to ignite, lessening the risk of a catastrophic fire or explosion, and reduced the erosive effects of the gaseous propellant on the gun's bore. Sources differ on the amount of RP C/38 used by the gun during World War II; Campbell says 70 kg (154 lb), but Hogg says 67 kg (148 lb).

These guns mounted fired two types of shells during World War I: armor-piercing (AP) L/2.6 and high explosive (HE) L/2.9 types. During World War II, the guns fired a wider variety of shells, including high explosive L/2.9, L/4.3, and L/4.1 shells and a heavy HE L/4.4 projectile; the AP and HE rounds weighed 240 kg (529 lb), while the heavy projectile weighed 284 kg (626 lb).

Shell name	Weight	Filling Weight	Muzzle velocity	Range
World War I
Armor-piercing shell (Pzgr L/2.6)	240 kg (530 lb)	unknown	820 m/s (2,700 ft/s)	18,830 m (20,590 yd)
high-explosive shell (Sprenggranate L/2.9)	240 kg (530 lb)	unknown	820 m/s (2,700 ft/s)	unknown
World War II
base-fused high-explosive shell with ballistic cap (Sprenggranate L/4.3 m. Bdz. (mit Haube))	240 kg (530 lb)	unknown	820 m/s (2,700 ft/s)	unknown
nose-fused HE shell with ballistic cap (Sprenggranate L/4.1 m. Kz. (mit Haube))	240 kg (530 lb)	unknown	820 m/s (2,700 ft/s)	unknown
base- and nose-fused HE shell with ballistic cap (Sprgr L/4.4 m. Bdz. u. Kz. (mit Haube))	284 kg (626 lb)	18.7 kg (41 lb) (TNT)	740 m/s (2,400 ft/s)	25,640 m (28,040 yd) at 30°

Due to the greater elevation available in the BSG mount, the Sprgr L/4.4 m. Bdz. u. Kz. (mit Haube) had a maximum range of 27,750 m (30,350 yd).

=== Armor penetration ===
One source credits the Pzgr L/2.6 shell with the ability to penetrate 160 millimeters (6.3 in) of side armor at 12,000 meters (13,000 yd).

== See also ==
- List of naval guns
