= 17 cm SK L/40 gun =

World War-era German naval and railway gun

17 cm SK L/40
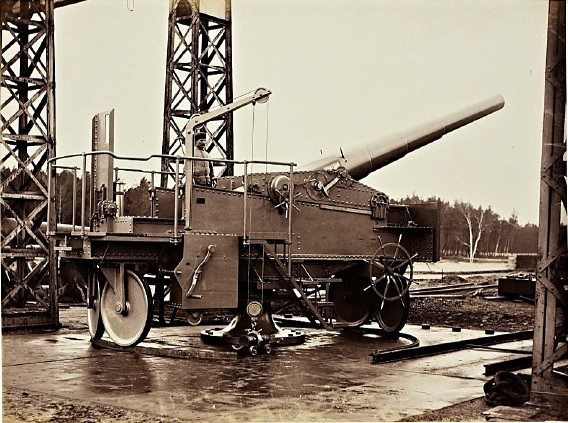
- A 17 cm SK L/40 on a Kusten-Mittlepivot-Lafette
- Type: Naval gun Railway gun Coast-defence gun
- Place of origin: German Empire

Service history
- In service: 1906−1945
- Used by: German Empire; Nazi Germany
- Wars: World War I World War II

Production history
- Designed: 1904−1906

Specifications
- Mass: 10.7 metric tons (10.5 long tons; 11.8 short tons)
- Length: 6.904 meters (22 ft 7.8 in)
- Shell: separate-loading, cased charge
- Shell weight: 64 kg (141 lb)
- Caliber: 172.6 millimeters (6.80 in)
- Breech: horizontal sliding-wedge
- Elevation: Casemates: -5° to +22° Turrets: -5° to 30°
- Rate of fire: 6 RPM
- Muzzle velocity: 850 m/s (2,800 ft/s)
- Maximum firing range: Casemates: 15,860 metres (17,340 yd) at 22° Turrets: 18,500 metres (20,200 yd) at 30°

The 17 cm SK L/40 (Note: SK - Schnelladekanone (quick loading cannon); L - Länge in Kaliber (length in caliber)) was a Kaiserliche Marine naval gun that was used on two classes of German pre-dreadnought battleships the Braunschweig class and the Deutschland class as their secondary battery. Later they were adapted for land service during World War I and World War II.

== Description ==
The 17 cm SK L/40 gun although designated as 17 centimeters (6.7 in), its actual caliber was 17.26 centimeters (6.80 in). It used the Krupp horizontal sliding-block, or "wedge", as it is sometimes referred to, in a breech loading design, rather than the interrupted screw commonly used in the heavy guns of other nations. This required that the propellant charge be loaded in a metal, (usually brass), case which provides obturation, i.e. seals the breech to prevent escape of the expanding propellant gas.

=== Naval Use ===
The Braunschweig-class secondary battery consisted of fourteen 17 cm SK L/40 quick-firing guns, four of which were mounted in single turrets amidships, with the remaining ten in casemates around the superstructure. These guns had a total of 1,820 shells, for 130 rounds per gun and a rate of fire of approximately 6 per minute. To transit the Kiel Canal, the three central casemated guns had to be withdrawn into their housings, as they were unable to train fully flush with the sides of the ships. With the guns fully emplaced, the ships would have been too wide to fit in the canal.

The Deutschland-class secondary battery consisted of fourteen 17 cm SK L/40 quick-firing guns mounted in casemates amidships. Five were emplaced in the top deck and two one deck higher in the superstructure on either side. These guns had a total of 1,820 shells, for 130 rounds per gun and a rate of fire of approximately 6 per minute. The guns had an arc of train of 160°.

=== World War I Field Gun ===
When the pre-dreadnoughts began to be relegated to training duties in 1916. The guns were adapted for land use by mounting it on an improvised carriage, but this proved to be extremely heavy, often too heavy to be moved by horse, even after being broken down into three loads. The solution was to mount the guns, still on their carriages, on rail cars to increase their strategic mobility.

=== World War I Railway Gun ===
A number of guns were used as railway guns during World War I.

=== World War II Railway Gun ===
Six guns were used as railway guns from 1938 onwards. They spent the war assigned to Artillerie-Batteries 717 and 718 (E) along the Channel coast.

== Gallery ==
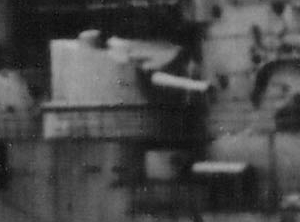
17-cm guns mounted in upper turret and lower casemate on starboard side of German battleship SMS Hessen.

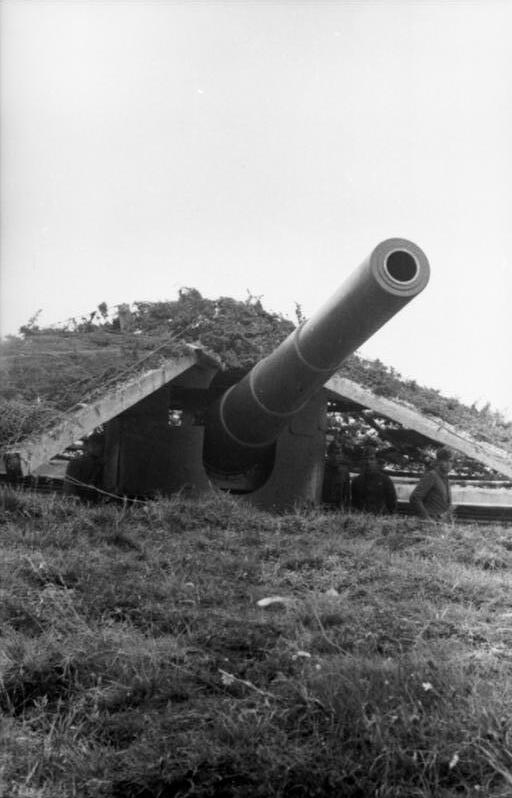
A 17 cm SK L/40 gun in the Atlantic Wall.

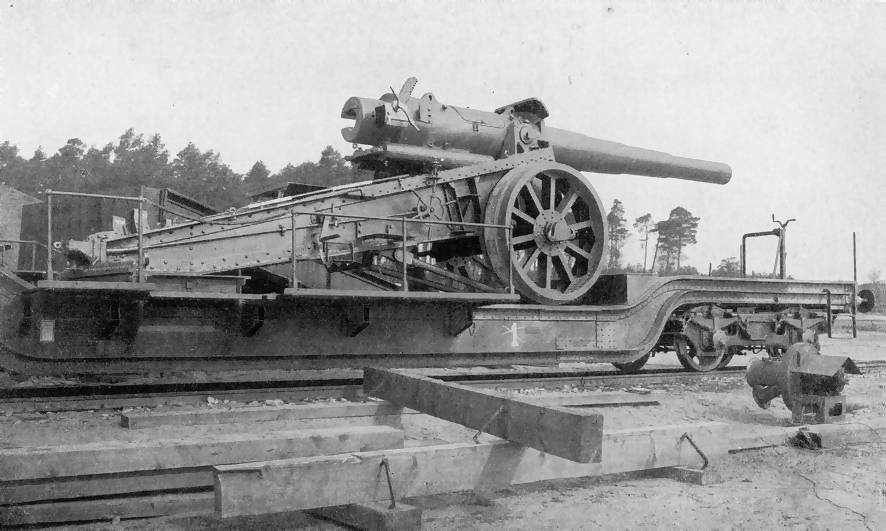
17 cm SK L/40 i.R.L. auf Eisenbahnwagen.

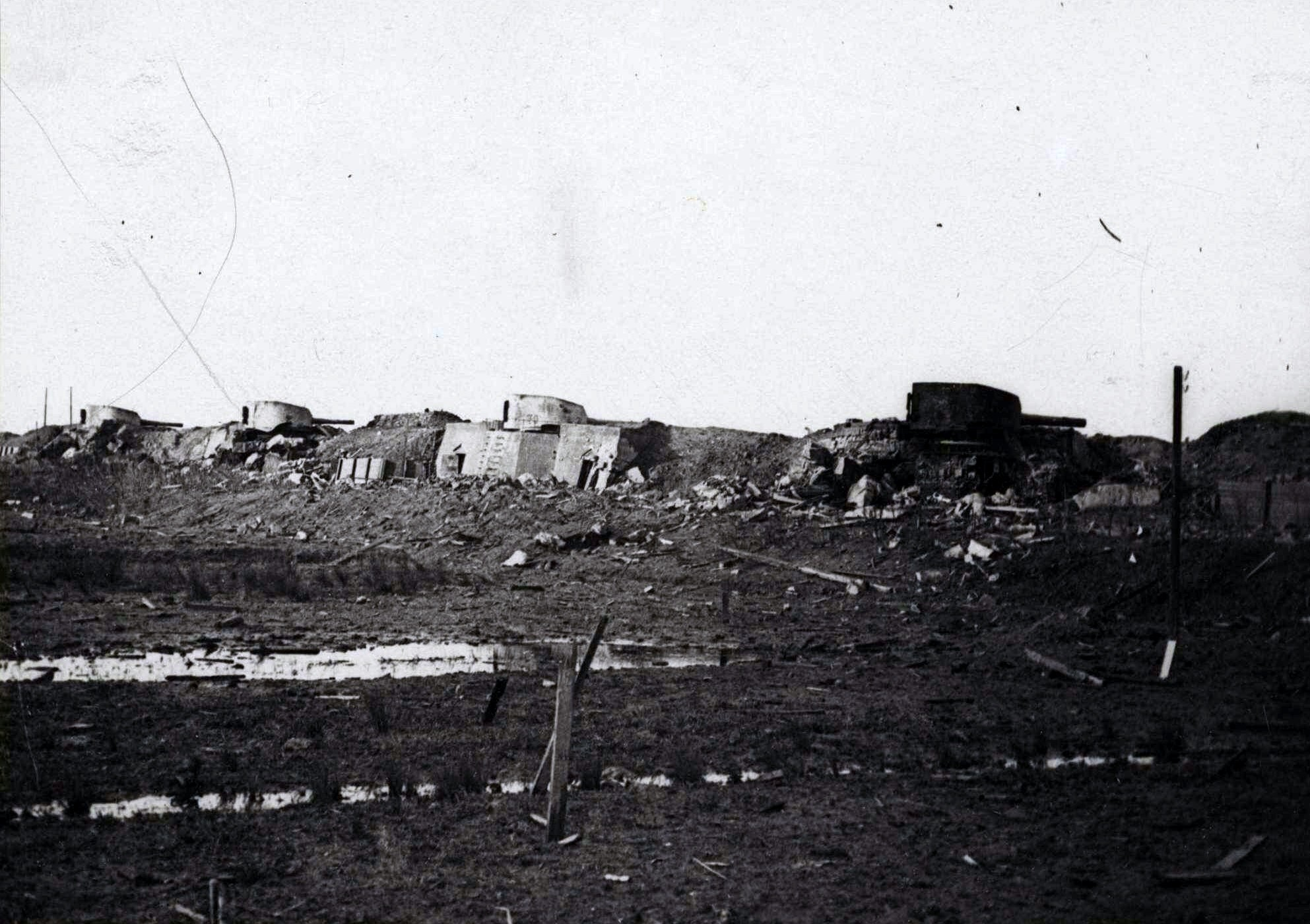
The four guns of the Friedrichsort battery at Zeebrugge, Belgium.

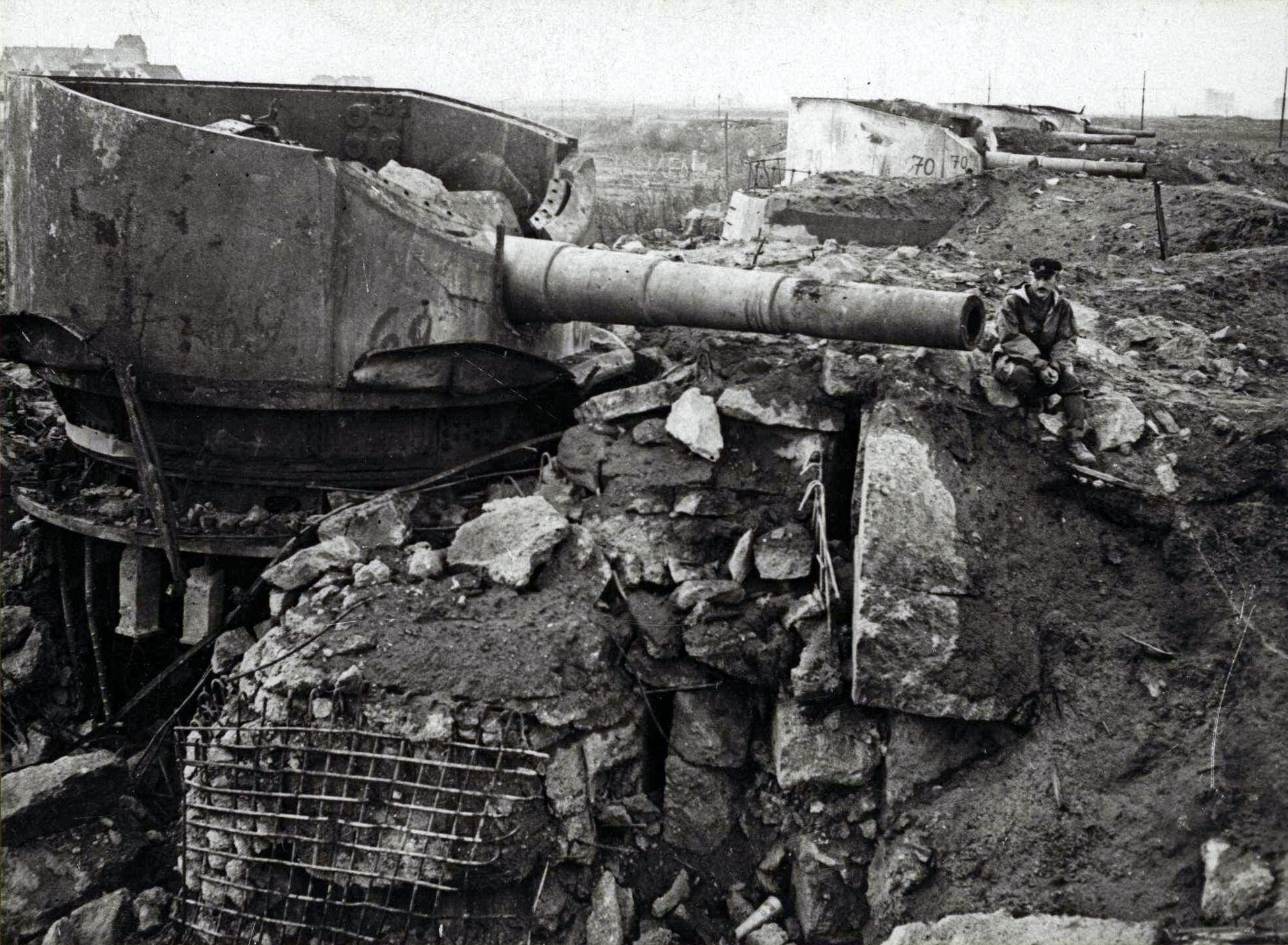
A sabotaged gun of the Friedrichsort battery.

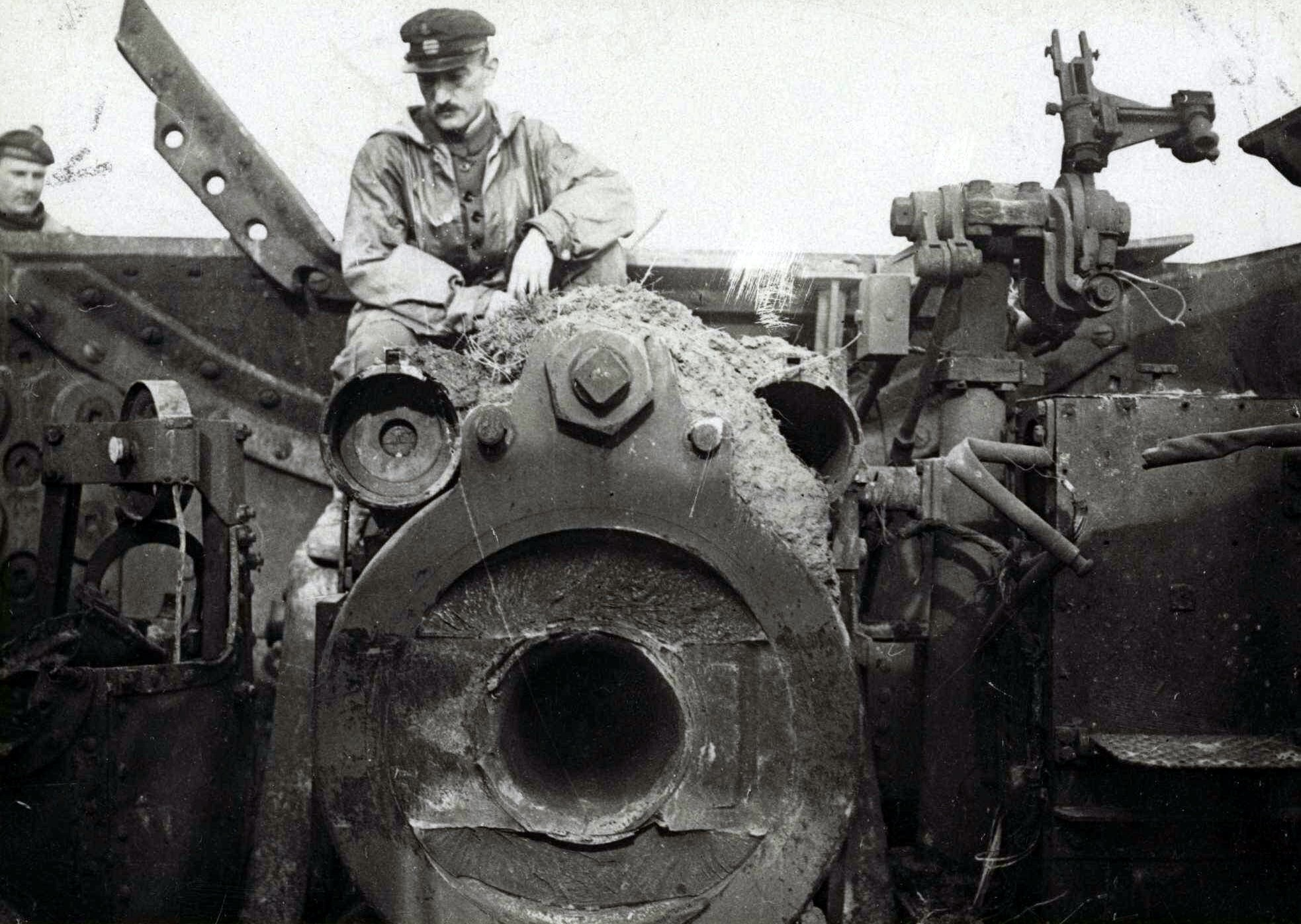
The damaged breech of a gun of the Friedrichsort battery.

== See also ==
- List of naval guns
