= Guttormsen =

Guttormsen is a Norwegian surname meaning "son of Guttorm". Notable people with the surname include:

- Finn Guttormsen (born 1968), Norwegian jazz musician
- Guttorm Guttormsen (born 1950), Norwegian jazz musician
- Oscar Guttormsen (1884–1964), Norwegian athlete
- Per Willy Guttormsen (born 1942), Norwegian speed skater
- Simen Guttormsen (born 2001), Norwegian pole vaulter
- Sondre Guttormsen (born 1999), Norwegian pole vaulter
- Thorsten Guttormsen Fretheim (1808–?), Norwegian politician
- Ulf Guttormsen (born 1942), Norwegian politician
