= Fort Kopgalis =

19th-century Prussian fort in Lithuania

Coordinates: 55°43′00″N 21°05′59″E

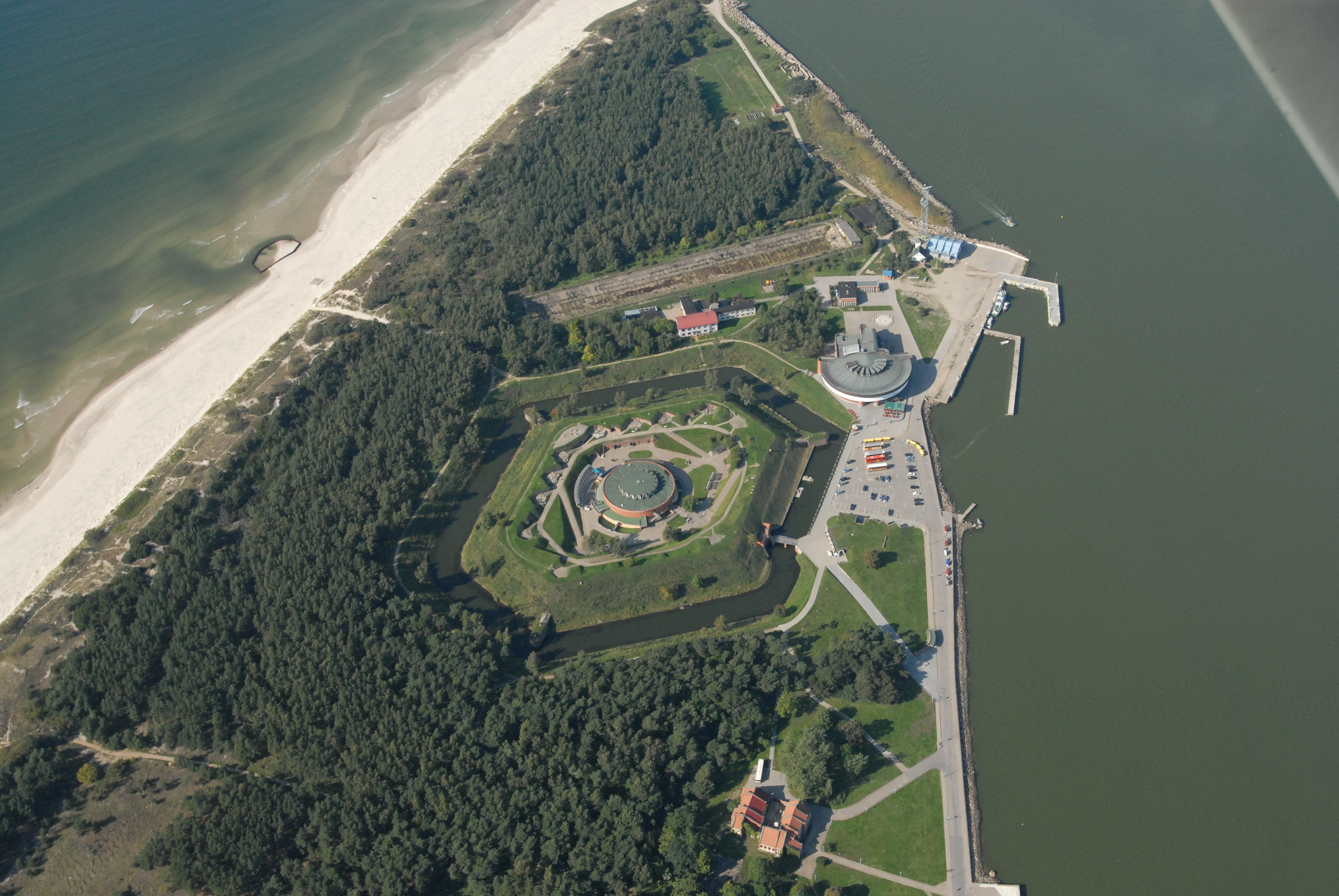
An aerial photograph of Fort Kopgalis from 2008.

Fort Kopgalis is a Prussian fortification located in the Lithuanian port of Klaipėda. The fort dates from the middle of the 19th Century, but became obsolete at the end of the same century. The fort is located on the Curonian Spit just outside the harbor, and is surrounded by a wet moat.

== Description ==
One of Fort Kopgalis' caponiers and it's surrounding wet moat.

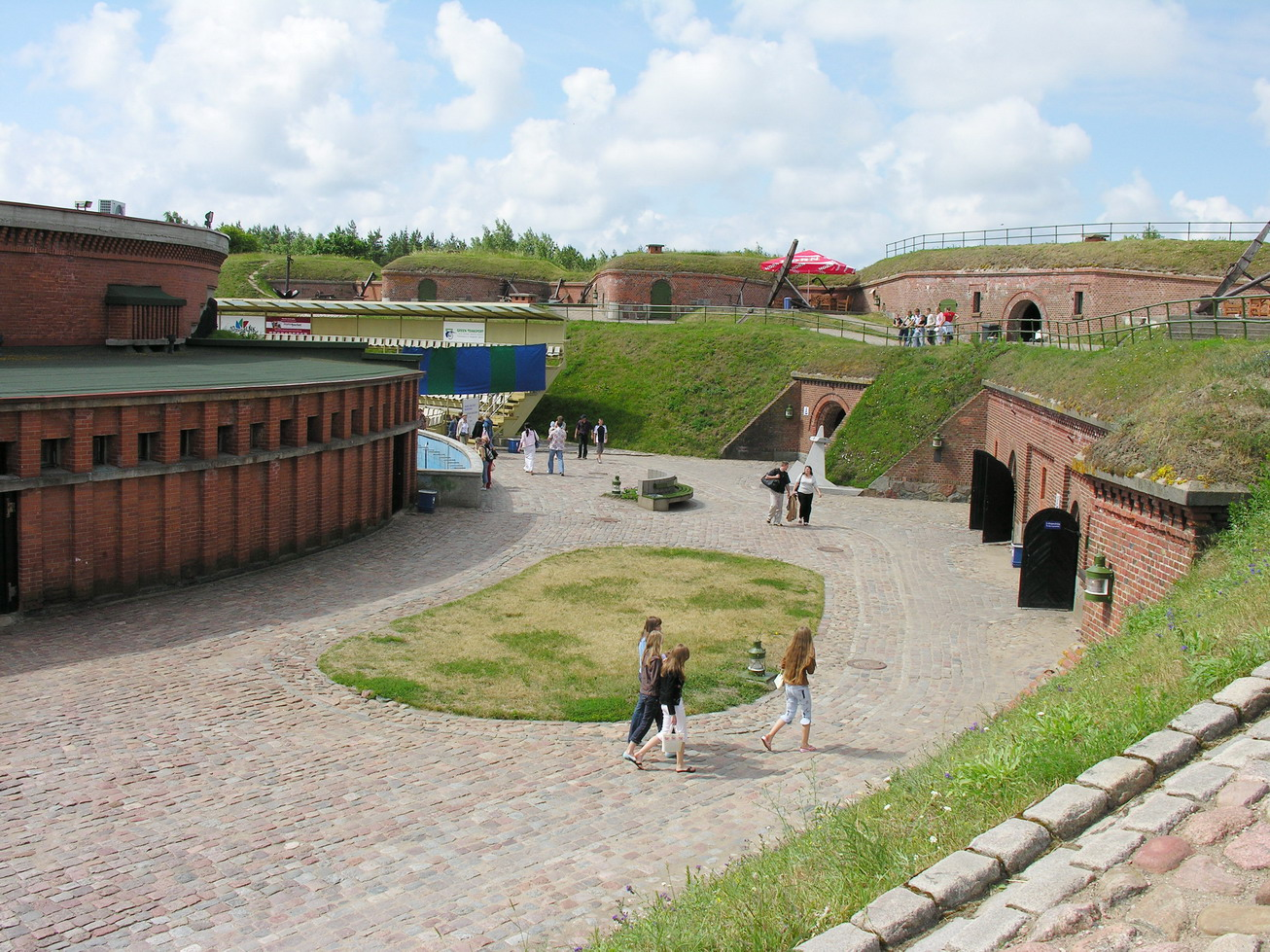
The firing positions in the center of the photo. On the left is the central tower that commanded the fort; on the right are several entrances to ammunition storerooms and supply shelters.

Fort Kopgalis is a polygonal shape, and the armament was arrayed to fire at every angle. The fort was built between 1865 and 1873, and has a wet moat and 3 caponiers. The fort had a single entrance, which was a brick arch surrounded by earth. This entrance was guarded by 4 rifle embrasures which could fire on the moat bridge. The main fort is a large polygonal earth construction with brick-lined tunnels going throughout. The polygon is outlined by a wet moat; within that was a raised earth wall protecting a central “keep”. The design of the fort was meant to mimic the Vauban-style star forts of the 17th century. Within the center of the fort is a multi-story brick tower, which was the command center of the fort. Since its construction in 1873, the fort underwent numerous renovations until 1890. Despite being numerously renovated, the fort was declared obsolete in 1897 and handed over to the local government. The fort was armed with 18 8 cm C/73 long range naval guns. The shells and gunpowder was stored 1 floor below the guns in large brick vaults accessed in the central part of the fort.

== History ==
One of the firing positions on the middle-left. On either side is access to the ammunition storerooms. More storerooms can be seen on the bottom far right.

Construction started on Fort Kopgalis in 1865, but with the outbreak of war with Austria in 1866, the fort was armed. After the war was over, construction on the fort resumed, construction was completed in 1873. By the 1890s, the advancements in naval artillery and high-energy shells made many forts obsolete, including Fort Kopgalis. In 1897, German authorities officially deemed Fort Kopgalis obsolete and turned it over to the authorities of Memel (Klaipeda). The cannons were disassembled and taken with the German army when they left, but all the other machinery was kept intact.

A picture of the fort's entrance in the 1920s.

The fort's entrance in 2023.

A school operated inside the fort for 5 years before moving out. In 1902, a signal station was built on the northern side of the fort to signal merchant ships entering the harbor. During World War I, when Russians briefly captured Memel between March 17–18, 1915, the fort acted as a refuge for the local population. A German force consisting of cavalry and infantry division forced the retreat of Russian troops and the fort was once again abandoned. After World War I, the Treaty of Versailles forced Germany to give up control of Memel and placed it under a League of Nations mandate. In 1923, riots in Memel (which were supported by Lithuania) erupted, in which Lithuania annexed the territory from the French. When Germany annexed Memel in March 1939, German troops once again entered the fort and garrisoned it, even adding field artillery to protect the harbor.

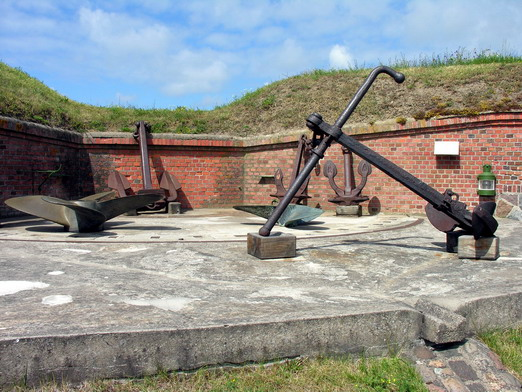
Some anchors and a propeller in one of the firing positions.

The German artillery was removed when the Memel Nord Battery was completed. On Oct. 14, 1944, German forces attempted to demolish Fort Kopgalis as Operation Bagration brought the Soviets close to the fort. Soviet forces finally liberated the fort in January 1945, during the Vistula–Oder offensive. They found the fort majorly intact despite German attempts to demolish the fort. After World War II ended, the Soviet Union incorporated Lithuania into the Soviet Union as the Lithuanian Soviet Socialist Republic, a puppet state of the Soviet Union. Soviet border guards were stationed in the fort until 1975. They were stationed there because it was the Soviet Union's largest ice-free port on the Baltic. Between 1976 and 1978, the fort was restored. In 1979, the Lithuanian Maritime Museum moved into the fort and has resided there since. Each of the firing positions now contains an anchor instead of a gun.
