= SMS Schlesien =

Battleship of the German Imperial Navy

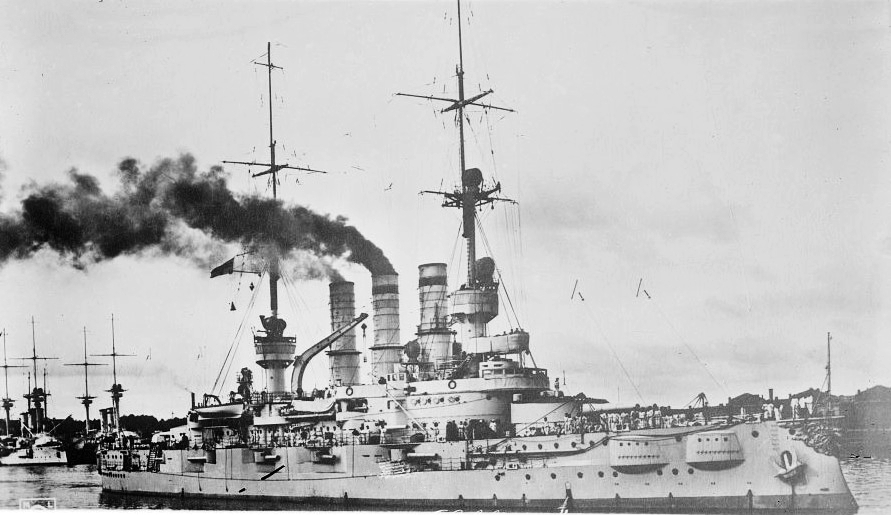
- Schlesien before World War I

History

Germany
- Name: Schlesien
- Namesake: Silesia
- Ordered: 11 June 1904
- Builder: Schichau, Danzig
- Laid down: 19 November 1904
- Launched: 28 May 1906
- Commissioned: 5 May 1908
- Decommissioned: 1 December 1918
- Reinstated: 1 March 1927
- Fate: Mined off Swinemünde in 3 May 1945, scrapped 1949–1956

General characteristics
- Class & type: Deutschland-class battleship
- Displacement: Normal: 13,191 t (12,983 long tons); Full load: 14,218 t (13,993 long tons)
- Length: 127.60 m (418 ft 8 in)
- Beam: 22.20 m (72 ft 10 in)
- Draft: 7.70 m (25 ft 3 in)
- Installed power: 18,664 ihp (13,918 kW); 12 × water-tube boilers
- Propulsion: 3 × triple-expansion steam engines; 3 × screw propellers
- Speed: 18.5 knots (34.3 km/h; 21.3 mph)
- Range: 4,770 nmi (8,830 km; 5,490 mi) at 10 knots (19 km/h; 12 mph)
- Complement: 743
- Armament: Original: 4 × 28 cm (11 in) SK L/40 guns; 14 × 17 cm (6.7 in) SK L/40 guns; 20 × 8.8 cm (3.5 in) SK L/45 naval guns; 6 × 45 cm (18 in) torpedo tubes; Armament in 1939: 4 × 28 cm SK L/40 guns; 2 x 8.8 cm SK L/45 guns; 4 × 3.7 cm (1.5 in) SK C/30 guns; 4 × 2 cm (0.79 in) C/30 guns
- Armor: 240 mm (9.4 in) in belt; 280 mm (11 in) in turrets; 40 mm (1.6 in) in deck

SMS Schlesien (Note: "SMS" stands for "Seiner Majestät Schiff", or "His Majesty's Ship" in German.) was one of five Deutschland-class pre-dreadnought battleships built for the German Kaiserliche Marine (Imperial Navy) between 1904 and 1906. Named after the German province of Silesia, Schlesien was laid down at the Schichau-Werke shipyard in Danzig on 19 November 1904, launched on 28 May 1906, and commissioned on 5 May 1908. She was armed with a battery of four 28 cm (11 in) guns and had a top speed of 18 knots (33 km/h; 21 mph). The ships of her class were already outdated by the time they entered service, as they were inferior in size, armor, firepower, and speed to the revolutionary new British battleship HMS Dreadnought.

After commissioning, Schlesien was assigned to I Battle Squadron of the High Seas Fleet, later being transferred to II Battle Squadron. She was primarily occupied with training cruises and fleet maneuvers in her early career. She served with the fleet throughout the first two years of World War I, seeing action at the Battle of Jutland on 31 May – 1 June 1916, where she was briefly actively engaged in combat. After Jutland, the Imperial Navy relegated Schlesien to guard duties before withdrawing her altogether in 1917, when she became a training ship. The Treaty of Versailles permitted the German navy to keep eight obsolete battleships, including Schlesien, to defend the German coast. Initially kept in reserve, she was modernized in the mid-1920s and saw extensive service with the reorganized Reichsmarine.

Schlesien saw limited combat during World War II, briefly bombarding Polish forces during the invasion of Poland in September 1939. She escorted minesweepers during Operation Weserübung, the invasion of Norway and Denmark in April 1940. After the operation, she was given secondary duties, primarily serving as a training ship and icebreaker. She ended her career providing fire support in the Baltic coast. While off Swinemünde on 3 May 1945, she struck a mine and was towed into Swinemünde, where she was sunk by her crew in shallow water, though much of her superstructure, including her main battery, remained above water. In the remaining days of the war, Schlesien used her anti-aircraft guns to defend the city from air attack. After the end of the war, she was broken up, though some parts of the ship remained visible until the 1970s.

== Design ==
The passage of the Second Naval Law in 1900 under the direction of Vizeadmiral (VAdm—Vice Admiral) Alfred von Tirpitz secured funding for the construction of twenty new battleships over the next seventeen years. The first group, the five Braunschweig-class battleships, were laid down in the early 1900s, and shortly thereafter design work began on a follow-on design, which became the Deutschland class. The Deutschland-class ships were broadly similar to the Braunschweigs, featuring incremental improvements in armor protection. They also abandoned the gun turrets for the secondary battery guns, moving them back to traditional casemates to save weight. The British battleship HMS Dreadnought—armed with ten 12-inch (30.5 cm) guns—was commissioned in December 1906. Dreadnought's revolutionary design rendered every capital ship of the German navy obsolete, including the Deutschland class.

=== Characteristics ===
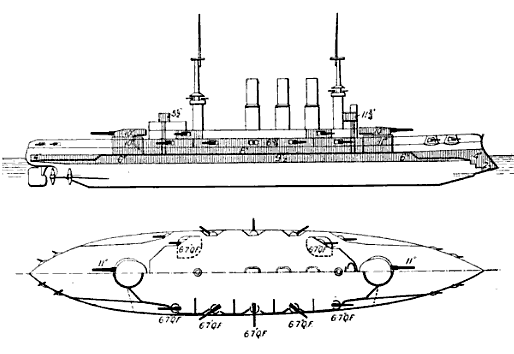
Plan and profile drawing of the Deutschland class

Schlesien was 127.60 m (418 ft 8 in) long, had a beam of 22.20 m (72 ft 10 in), and a draft of 8.21 m (26 ft 11 in). She displaced 13,191 t (12,983 long tons), and had a full-load displacement of 14,218 metric tons (13,993 long tons). She had a flush deck and a pronounced ram bow. Her superstructure included a small, armored conning tower forward with an open bridge atop it, along with a smaller, secondary conning tower aft. The ship was equipped with two heavy military masts. She had a standard crew of 35 officers and 708 enlisted men.

The ship's propulsion system consisted of three triple-expansion steam engines that each drove a screw propeller. Steam was provided by twelve coal-fired water-tube boilers that were vented through three funnels. Her power-plant was rated to produce 18,664 indicated horsepower (13,918 kW) and a top speed of 18.5 knots (34.3 km/h; 21.3 mph). She had a fuel capacity of up to 1,540 metric tons (1,520 long tons; 1,700 short tons) of coal. Although the third-fastest ship of her class, Schlesien was the second-least fuel efficient. At a cruising speed of 10 knots (19 km/h; 12 mph), she could steam for 4,770 nautical miles (8,830 km; 5,490 mi).

The ship's primary armament of four 28 cm SK L/40 guns in two twin turrets; (Note: In Imperial German Navy gun nomenclature, "SK" (Schnelladekanone) denotes that the gun is quick loading, while the L/40 denotes the length of the gun. In this case, the L/40 gun is 40 caliber, meaning that the gun is 40 times long as it is in diameter.) one turret was placed forward and the other aft. Her offensive armament was rounded out with a secondary battery of fourteen 17 cm (6.7 in) SK L/40 guns mounted individually in casemates. A battery of twenty 8.8 cm (3.5 in) SK L/45 guns in single mounts provided defense against torpedo boats. These were distributed along the ship, including in sponsons in the bow and stern and in the superstructure. The ship was fitted with six 45 cm (18 in) torpedo tubes, all submerged in the hull. One was in the bow, one in the stern, and four on the broadside.

Schlesien was protected with Krupp cemented armor. Her armor belt was 240 mm (9.4 in) thick amidships in the citadel, tapering to 100 mm (3.9 in) forward and aft, all backed with 80 Mm (49,709.7 mi) of teak planking. She had a curved armor deck that angled down at the sides to connect to the bottom of the belt armor. The deck was 40 mm (1.6 in) thick on the flat section and increased to 67–94 mm (2.6–3.7 in) on the sloped sides. The main battery turrets had 280 mm (11.0 in) thick sides, and her secondary casemates had 170 mm (6.7 in) of armor plate on their exposed sides. Her main conning tower received the heaviest protection, with sides that were 300 mm (11.8 in) thick.

== Service history ==
The contracts for the last two members of the Deutschland class, ordered under the contract names "R" and "Q", were awarded on 11 June 1904. (Note: German warships were ordered under provisional names. Additions to the fleet were given a single letter; ships intended to replace older or lost vessels were ordered as "Ersatz (name of the ship to be replaced)".) "R" was laid down on 19 November at the Schichau dockyard in Danzig. She was launched on 28 May 1906, at which time Duchess Mathilde of Pless christened her Schlesien, after the province of Silesia. Graf von Zedlitz Trützschler, the Oberpräsident of Silesia, gave a speech at the launching ceremony. A shipyard crew took the ship from Danzig to Kiel in March 1908 for her final fitting out. Schlesien was commissioned into the fleet on 5 May. She then began sea trials, which were delayed from 6 July to 5 September when the ship was temporarily used as a torpedo testing ship in place of the protected cruiser Vineta, which had to go into drydock for an overhaul. By early September, Vineta had completed her overhaul, allowing Schlesien to join the fleet. She received her full crew on 22 September and thereafter joined I Battle Squadron.

The ships of the High Seas Fleet embarked on a cruise into the Atlantic Ocean that lasted from 7 July to 1 August. While on the way back to Germany, they were received by the British Royal Navy in Spithead. In late 1909, Admiral Henning von Holtzendorff became the new fleet commander. His tenure as fleet commander was marked by strategic experimentation, due to the threat the latest underwater weapons posed, and the fact that the new Nassau-class battleships were too wide to pass through the Kaiser Wilhelm Canal. Accordingly, the fleet was transferred from Kiel to Wilhelmshaven on 1 April 1910. In May 1910, the fleet conducted training maneuvers in the Kattegat. These were in accordance with Holtzendorff's strategy, which envisioned drawing the Royal Navy into the narrow waters there. The annual summer cruise was to Norway, and was followed by fleet training, during which another fleet review was held in Danzig on 29 August. A training cruise into the Baltic Sea took place at the end of the year.

In March 1911, the fleet conducted exercises in the Skagerrak and Kattegat. Schlesien and the rest of the fleet received British and American naval squadrons at Kiel in June and July. The year's autumn maneuvers were confined to the Baltic and the Kattegat, during which another fleet review was held in order to prepare for an Austro-Hungarian delegation that included Archduke Franz Ferdinand and Admiral Rudolf Montecuccoli. On 3 November 1911, Schlesien was transferred to II Battle Squadron with the rest of her sister ships; at this time, she transferred back to Kiel, where II Squadron was based. In mid-1912, due to the Agadir Crisis, the summer cruise was confined to the Baltic, to avoid exposing the fleet during the period of heightened tension with Britain and France. The fleet thereafter held the annual autumn maneuvers in August and September. A winter cruise in the Baltic followed at the end of the year. In 1913 the same uneventful pattern followed. On 14 July 1914, the annual summer cruise to Norway began. The threat of war during the July Crisis forced Kaiser Wilhelm II to end the cruise after only two weeks; by the end of July the fleet was back in port. War between Austria-Hungary and Serbia broke out on the 28th, and in the span of a week all of the major European powers had joined the conflict.

=== World War I ===
Schlesien served with the High Seas Fleet through the first two years of the war. At the outbreak of the conflict, the ship was deployed to guard the German Bight. She then rejoined the High Seas Fleet to support the battlecruisers that bombarded Scarborough, Hartlepool, and Whitby on 15–16 December 1914. During the operation, the German battle fleet of 12 dreadnoughts and 8 pre-dreadnoughts came to within 10 nmi (19 km; 12 mi) of an isolated squadron of six British battleships. Skirmishes between the rival destroyer screens convinced Admiral Friedrich von Ingenohl that he was confronted with the entire Grand Fleet, and so he broke off the engagement and went back home. Two fruitless fleet advances followed on 17–18 and 21–23 April 1915. Another followed on 17–18 May, and another on 23–24 October. In March 1916, Schlesien was employed as a target ship for U-boats. On 24–25 April, Schlesien and her sisters joined the dreadnoughts of the High Seas Fleet to support the battlecruisers of I Scouting Group on a raid of the English coast. While en route to the target, the battlecruiser Seydlitz was damaged by a mine. The remaining battlecruisers conducted a short bombardment of the ports of Yarmouth and Lowestoft. The target's visibility was poor, so the operation was soon called off before the British fleet could intervene. Squadron exercises in the Baltic followed from 11 to 22 May.

==== Battle of Jutland ====
Diagram of the Battle of Jutland showing the major movements

Admiral Scheer immediately planned another foray into the North Sea, but the damage to Seydlitz delayed the operation until the end of May. Schlesien was the second ship in IV Division of II Battle Squadron under the command of Rear Admiral Franz Mauve, positioned at the rear of the German line. During the ensuing operation, Schlesien was the second to last ship in the German line, followed only by her sister ship Schleswig-Holstein. During the "Run to the North", Admiral Reinhard Scheer, the commander of the fleet, ordered the fleet to pursue the British V Battle Squadron at top speed. The slower Deutschland-class ships could not keep up with the faster dreadnoughts and quickly fell behind. By 19:30, the Grand Fleet had arrived on the scene and confronted Scheer with a large numerical superiority. The German fleet was severely hampered by the presence of the slower Deutschland-class ships; if Scheer ordered an immediate turn towards Germany, he would have to sacrifice the slower ships to make good his escape.

Scheer decided to reverse the course of the fleet with the Gefechtskehrtwendung, a maneuver that required every unit in the German line to turn 180° simultaneously. As they had fallen behind, the ships of II Battle Squadron could not conform to the new course following the turn. Schlesien and the other five ships of the squadron were, therefore, located on the disengaged side of the German line. Mauve considered moving his ships to the rear of the line, astern of III Battle Squadron dreadnoughts, but decided against it when he realized the movement would interfere with the maneuvering of Admiral Franz von Hipper's battlecruisers. Instead, he attempted to place his ships at the head of the line.

Later on the first day of the battle, the hard-pressed battlecruisers of I Scouting Group were being pursued by their British opponents. Schlesien and the other so-called "five-minute ships" (Note: The men of the German navy referred to the ships as "five-minute ships" because that was the length of time they were expected to survive if confronted by a dreadnought.) came to their aid by steaming in between the opposing battlecruiser squadrons. Schlesien and her sisters could barely make out a target in the darkness. Owing to the poor visibility their shooting was ineffective. The British battlecruisers scored several hits on the German ships; in the brief melee a near miss from a large-caliber gun sprayed shell splinters onto Schlesien's decks, killing one man and wounding another. Admiral Mauve ordered an 8-point turn to the south, and the British did not follow.

Late on the 31st, the fleet organized for the night return to Germany; Schlesien and Schleswig-Holstein fell in behind the mauled battlecruisers Von der Tann and Derfflinger at the rear of the line. British destroyers conducted a series of attacks against the fleet, some of which targeted Schlesien. Regardless, the High Seas Fleet punched through the British destroyer forces and reached Horns Reef by 04:00 on 1 June. The German fleet reached Wilhelmshaven a few hours later, where the undamaged dreadnoughts of the Nassau and Helgoland classes took up defensive positions.

==== Later wartime service ====
After Jutland, Schlesien and her three surviving sisters returned to picket duty at the mouth of the Elbe, and in June and July Schlesien again served as a torpedo target ship for U-boats. The experience at Jutland demonstrated that pre-dreadnoughts had no place in a naval battle with dreadnoughts, and they were thus left behind when the High Seas Fleet sortied again on 18 August. From 31 January to 9 February 1917, she served in the Danish Straits as a guard ship, and also as an icebreaker, after which she returned to the Elbe. From 2 May to 8 June, she was again used as a target ship in the Baltic. Her guard ship duties in the Elbe ended on 27 July, when she was withdrawn from service and converted into a training ship for engine room personnel and new recruits. She served in this capacity from 20 August to 16 April 1918.

In late April, Schlesien was taken into the drydock at the Kaiserliche Werft (Imperial Shipyard) in Wilhelmshaven to be converted into a training ship for naval cadets. The ship's main and secondary battery guns were removed so they could be used ashore, leaving Schlesien equipped with a battery of 10.5 cm (4.1 in) and 8.8 cm (3.5 in) guns. She had made several training cruises in the Baltic by November 1918; she was in Kiel during the Kiel mutiny in the closing days of the war. On 5 November, she left the port still flying the Imperial German flag even after most of the other vessels in the port had hoisted the red flag of revolution. Schlesien initially went to Flensburg, but mutiny had already spread to the port, so on orders from the Reichsmarineamt (Imperial Naval Office) she sailed instead to Swinemünde, where on 10 November her commander, Fregattenkapitän (Frigate Captain) von Waldeye-Hartz hauled down his flag and placed his ship out of service. He and the crew remained aboard, and on 14 November they took the ship back to Kiel, where they were released from service on 20 November. She was used briefly again to train cadets to operate boilers and engines; on 1 December, she was again removed from service.

=== Inter-war years ===
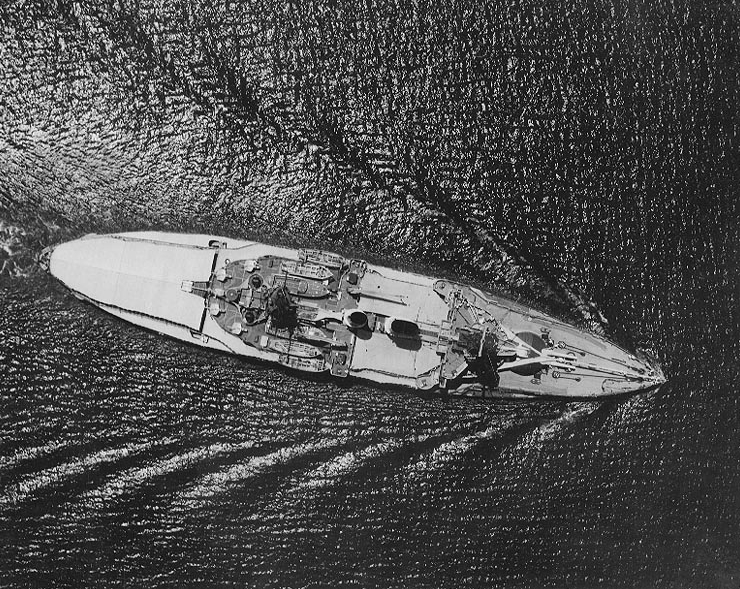
Schlesien in the Panama Canal in 1937

Following the German defeat in World War I, the German navy was reorganized as the Reichsmarine according to the Treaty of Versailles. The new navy was permitted to retain eight pre-dreadnought battleships under Article 181—two of which would be in reserve—for coastal defense. Schlesien was one of the vessels retained under the terms of the treaty, but was initially kept in reserve, since she still carried the battery of just 10.5 cm and 8.8 cm guns. By the mid-1920s, two of the battleships still in active service, Braunschweig and Hannover, were becoming worn out and needed replacement. The replacements for the old battleships—the Deutschland-class cruisers—would not be ready for some time, and so the navy decided to rearm and modernize Schlesien in 1926–1927. Her original 28 cm guns were reinstalled, and a new secondary battery of 15 cm (5.9 in) guns were installed in the casemates for the old 17 cm guns. This included removing the fore funnel and ducting those boilers into an enlarged funnel, and installing a new heavy pole mast. The work was completed on 1 March 1927, and she thereafter entered service with the crew from Hannover.

On joining the rest of the fleet, Schlesien became the flagship of the Commander of the Naval Forces of the North Sea, Konteradmiral (KAdm—Rear Admiral) Alexander Werth, which was renamed on 1 January 1930 the Commander of Battleships. She was based in Wilhelmshaven. In May 1927, President Paul von Hindenburg came to Wilhelmshaven to visit the fleet. The annual fleet maneuvers were conducted in August and September, as they had been in the prewar years, and they culminated in a naval review on 14 September for Hindenburg. KAdm Wilhelm Prentzel replaced Werth on 29 September and in October 1928 he was in turn replaced by KAdm Walther Franz. In the course of 1928, Schlesien went on a fleet cruise in the Atlantic in July and conducted shooting training in August with the old ironclad, now target ship, Baden. Another Atlantic cruise followed in April and May 1929. In February 1930, Franz, who had by then been promoted to the rank of vizeadmiral, turned command of the unit to KAdm Richard Foerster. From 3 April to 6 June, Schlesien embarked on a major training cruise by herself to the Mediterranean Sea, during which she visited Messina, Sicily, where her senior officers met King Victor Emmanuel III of Italy.

In June 1931, Schlesien visited Norway. Kommodore (Commodore) Max Bastian replaced Foerster in September 1932, and at the same time, Kapitän zur See (Captain at Sea) Wilhelm Canaris, who later served as chief of the Abwehr, took command of the ship, a position he would hold for the next two years. Schlesien made another trip into the Atlantic in January 1933, which included a stop in Iceland from 6 to 9 January. On 10 December 1933, the new heavy cruiser Deutschland replaced Schlesien as the flagship of the Commander of Battleships. Schlesien was converted back into a training ship for cadets between 18 February and 8 April 1935, and she was formally removed from the fleet organization on 30 September. Among the modifications were the installation of additional anti-aircraft guns and replacement of the ship's boilers. The newer boilers were more efficient, which allowed fewer of them to be used; the additional space this created was used as crew compartments for the cadets and an instruction room. The crew was also altered; the standard crew had been 35 officers and 708 enlisted men; after the conversion, this was reduced to 29 officers and 559 sailors, supplemented by 214 cadets. Over the course of the following three years, Schlesien embarked on several overseas training cruises as part of the Training Inspectorate. The first lasted from 1 December 1935 to 29 February 1936, and went to Cape Verde in the central Atlantic. More modernization work was done after her return to Germany, and from 12 October 1936 to 22 April 1937, she went on a tour of North, Central, and South America. Further cruises followed in October 1937, April 1938, and March 1939. Before the final overseas voyage, Schlesien stopped in Cork, Ireland, where the ship was involved in a minor international incident over James Hickey's refusal to greet the Germans in protest of the German press's statements regarding the recently deceased Pope Pius XI. In the late 1930s, her last coal-fired boilers were replaced with oil-fired models.

=== World War II ===
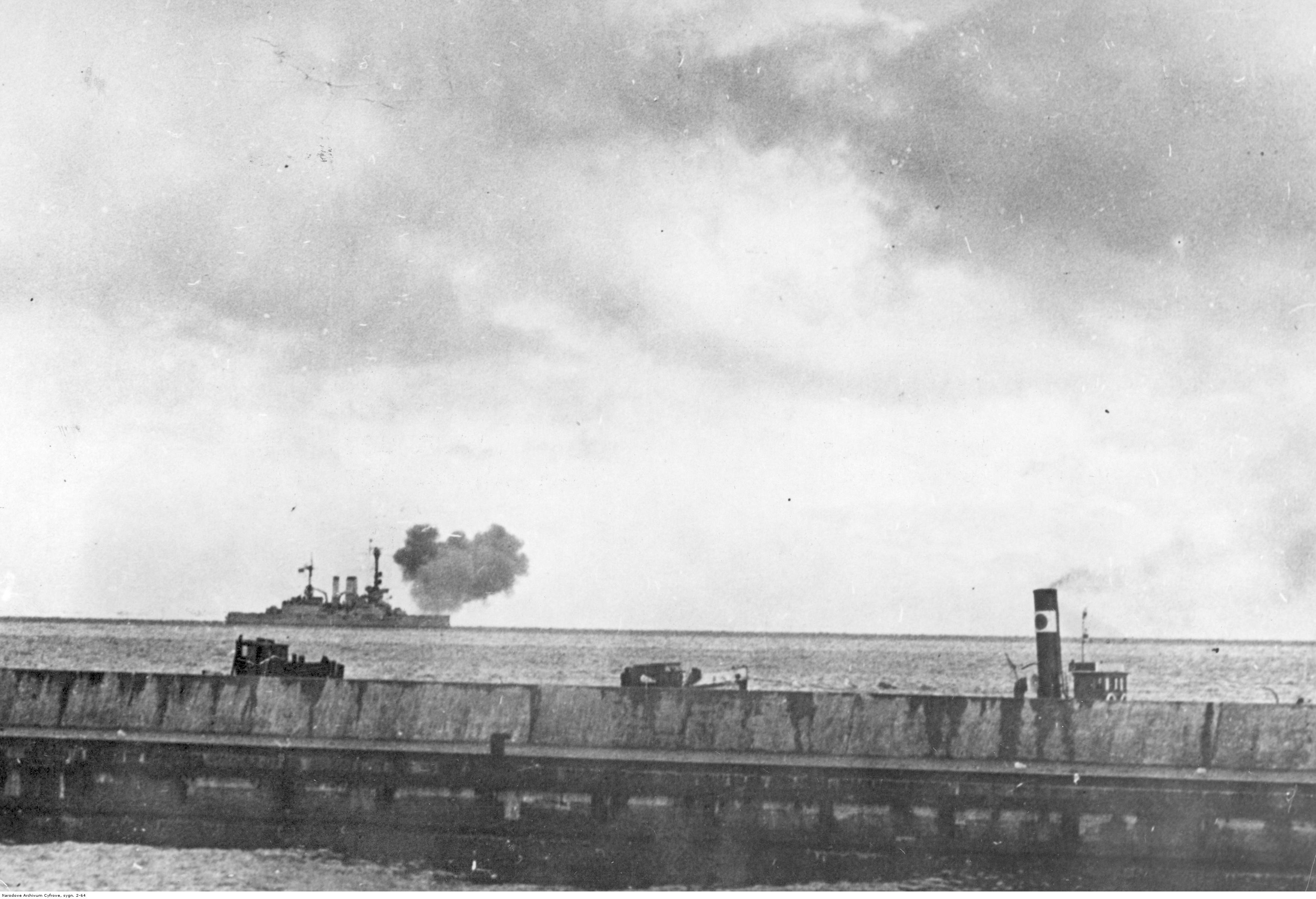
Schlesien fires at Hel Fortified Area.

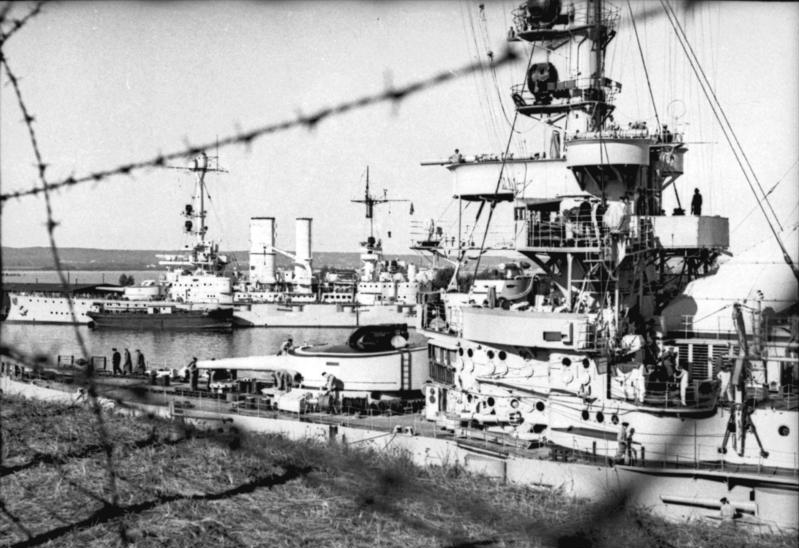
Schlesien (background) and Schleswig-Holstein (right side-foreground) in Westerplatte following the occupation of the port

After the outbreak of World War II following the German invasion of Poland on 1 September 1939, Schlesien initially remained in her training ship role, though from 21 to 27 September she was used to bombard Polish artillery positions around Hel and Jastarnia. After the operation, Schlesien had six of her 15 cm guns removed to arm the new surface raider Pinguin. She then returned to training ship duties, and from January to March 1940 served as an icebreaker to allow U-boats to operate. She then escorted minesweepers in the Little Belt in April during Operation Weserübung, the invasion of Norway and Denmark. She resumed training duties, but crew shortages forced the navy to deactivate the ship on 2 August, leaving only a skeleton crew aboard to maintain the ship's condition. In January 1941, she was reactivated to again serve as an icebreaker in the Baltic until 31 March, when she was again decommissioned in Gotenhafen, thereafter being used as a stationary training hulk with a skeleton crew.

As Germany began to prepare for war with the Soviet Union in early 1941, Schlesien was reactivated on 30 April to protect minelayers along with Schleswig-Holstein as they laid a series of minefields in the Baltic to prevent the Soviet Baltic Fleet from attempting to break out to Britain. The Soviet fleet did not attempt to leave port after Germany invaded in June, and so Schlesien was detached from the force guarding the minefields in October. She returned to Gotenhafen and resumed training duties there. Icebreaker service again summoned the vessel to active service from January to April 1942. On 4 April, Schlesien sailed back to Gotenhafen in company with the battleship Gneisenau and the icebreaker Castor. Schlesien thereafter saw limited training duties in the Baltic in 1943 and 1944, owing to the increasingly limited supplies of fuel oil available to Germany by this stage in the war. During this period, her armament was revised several times. In 1943, a pair of twin 37 mm (1.5 in) anti-aircraft guns were installed, one on each side of her bridge.

In early 1944, her anti-aircraft armament was strengthened considerably with the addition of two 40 mm guns and twenty 20 mm (0.79 in) guns; these were in two Flakvierling quadruple, and six twin mounts. Further enhancements were made later in the year, including with the installation of four heavy 10.5 cm anti-aircraft guns in place of the old 8.8 cm guns atop her aft superstructure and two more of the guns abreast her bridge, these taking the place of the 37 mm guns, which were removed. The light anti-aircraft battery increased to seven or ten 40 mm guns in single and double mounts and eighteen or twenty-two 20 mm guns in double and quadruple mounts (sources differ on the exact number of guns). Schlesien was also equipped with a FuMO-25 search radar and a FuMB-6 radar detection set, both of which were installed on the foremast. (Note: There is some discrepancy as to the ship's exact anti-aircraft armament in the later stages of World War II. According to H. T. Lenton's German Warships of the Second World War, the ship was armed with a battery of six 10.5 cm guns in individual mounts, ten 40 mm guns in single mounts, and twenty-two 20 mm guns, sixteen in quadruple Flakvierling mounts and the remaining six in twin mounts.)

She was moved from Danzig to Gotenhafen and then to Sopot from 15 to 21 March 1945 to provide gunfire support to German forces in the area. She was then used to carry more than 1,000 wounded soldiers from Sopot to Swinemünde, where she also restocked her ammunition. She then remained in the port to shell the advancing Soviet 2nd Shock Army. On 2 May, she was ordered to protect the Peenebrücke Wolgast bridge that connected Wolgast and the island of Usedom. Early on the morning of 3 May, while steaming south of Greifswalder Oie, she struck a British air-dropped naval mine; the explosion killed two men and caused significant flooding. She was taken under tow by the destroyer Z39 back to Swinemünde, where her anti-aircraft guns could be used to help defend the city. The crew scuttled the ship there in shallow water so she could not be sunk by air attack and risk capsizing. Between 1949 and 1956, the wreck was demolished and then scrapped in situ by an East German company. Some remains from the ship were still visible in 1970.
