= SMS Hannover =

Battleship of the German Imperial Navy

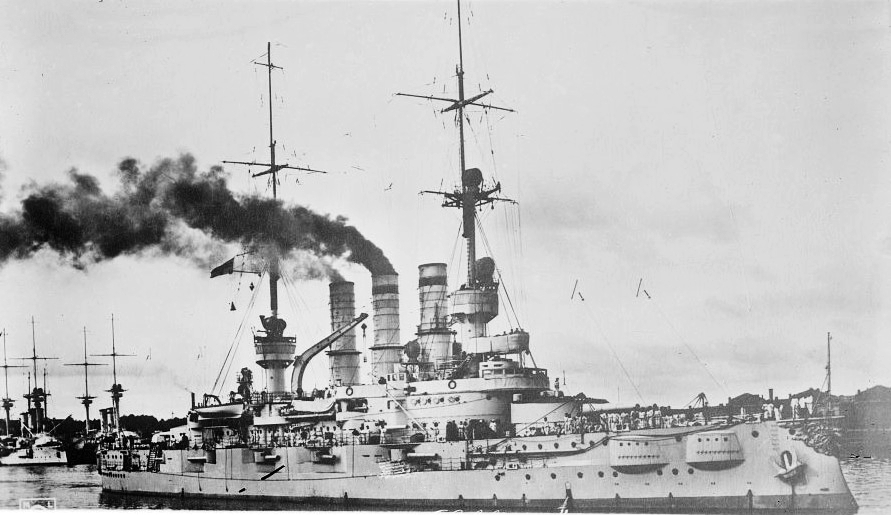
- SMS Hannover's sister ship Schlesien

History

Germany
- Name: Hannover
- Namesake: Province of Hanover
- Ordered: 1 June 1904
- Builder: Kaiserliche Werft Wilhelmshaven
- Laid down: 7 November 1904
- Launched: 29 May 1905
- Commissioned: 1 October 1907
- Recommissioned: 10 February 1921
- Decommissioned: 17 December 1918; 25 September 1931
- Stricken: 1936
- Fate: Scrapped between 1944 and 1946 in Bremerhaven

General characteristics
- Class & type: Deutschland-class battleship
- Displacement: Normal: 13,191 t (12,983 long tons); Full load: 14,218 t (13,993 long tons)
- Length: 127.6 m (418 ft 8 in)
- Beam: 22.2 m (72 ft 10 in)
- Draft: 8.21 m (26 ft 11 in)
- Installed power: 12 × Schulz-Thornycroft boilers; 17,453 ihp (13,015 kW)
- Propulsion: 3 × triple-expansion steam engines; 3 × screw propellers
- Speed: 18 knots (33 km/h; 21 mph)
- Range: 4,520 nmi (8,370 km; 5,200 mi) at 10 knots (19 km/h; 12 mph)
- Complement: 35 officers; 708 enlisted men
- Armament: 4 × 28 cm (11 in) SK L/40 guns; 14 × 17 cm (6.7 in) SK L/40 guns; 20 × 8.8 cm (3.5 in) SK L/45 naval guns; 6 × 45 cm (17.7 in) torpedo tubes
- Armor: Belt: 100 to 240 mm (3.9 to 9.4 in); Turrets: 280 mm (11 in); Deck: 40 mm (1.6 in)

SMS Hannover (Note: "SMS" stands for "Seiner Majestät Schiff", or "His Majesty's Ship" in German.) ("His Majesty's Ship Hannover") was the second of five Deutschland-class pre-dreadnought battleships of the German Imperial Navy (Kaiserliche Marine). Hannover and the three subsequently constructed ships differed slightly from the lead ship Deutschland in their propulsion systems and slightly thicker armor. Hannover was laid down in November 1904, launched in May 1905, and commissioned into the High Seas Fleet in October 1907. The ship was armed with a battery of four 28 cm (11 in) guns and had a top speed of 18 knots (33 km/h; 21 mph). The ships of her class were already outdated by the time they entered service, being inferior in size, armor, firepower, and speed to the revolutionary new British battleship HMS Dreadnought.

Hannover and her sister ships saw extensive service with the fleet. The ship took part in all major training maneuvers until World War I broke out in July 1914. Hannover and her sisters were immediately pressed into guard duties at the mouth of the Elbe River while the rest of the fleet mobilized. The ship took part in several fleet advances, which culminated in the Battle of Jutland on 31 May – 1 June 1916. During the battle, Hannover served as the flagship for IV Division of II Battle Squadron; she was not heavily engaged during the battle, nor was she damaged by enemy fire. After the battle, which exposed the weakness of pre-dreadnoughts like Hannover, she and her three surviving sisters were removed from active duty with the fleet to serve as guard ships. Hannover served in this capacity for the remainder of the war, first in the Elbe and, starting in 1917, in the Danish Straits. She was decommissioned in December 1918, shortly after the end of the war.

The ship was brought back to active service in the Reichsmarine, the post-war German navy. She served with the fleet for ten years, from 1921 to 1931, during which time she took part in several major overseas cruises to Spain and the Mediterranean Sea. Hannover was again decommissioned in September 1931; the navy planned to convert the ship into a radio-controlled target ship, but this was never carried out and she was instead used in explosive tests. Hannover was ultimately broken up for scrap between 1944 and 1946 in Bremerhaven. Her bell is preserved at the Military History Museum of the Bundeswehr in Dresden.

== Design ==
The passage of the Second Naval Law in 1900 under the direction of Vizeadmiral (VAdm—Vice Admiral) Alfred von Tirpitz secured funding for the construction of twenty new battleships over the next seventeen years. The first group, the five Braunschweig-class battleships, were laid down in the early 1900s, and shortly thereafter design work began on a follow-on design, which became the Deutschland class. The Deutschland-class ships were broadly similar to the Braunschweigs, featuring incremental improvements in armor protection. They also abandoned the gun turrets for the secondary battery guns, moving them back to traditional casemates to save weight. The British battleship HMS Dreadnought—armed with ten 12-inch (30.5 cm) guns—was commissioned in December 1906. Dreadnought's revolutionary design rendered every capital ship of the German navy obsolete, including the Deutschland class.

=== Characteristics ===
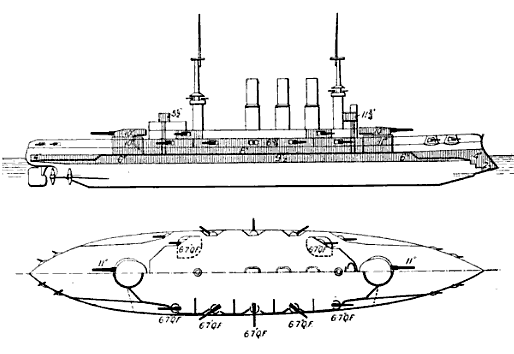
Plan and profile drawing of the Deutschland class

Hannover was 127.6 m (418 ft 8 in) long overall, with a beam of 22.2 m (72 ft 10 in), and a draft of 8.21 m (26 ft 11 in). She displaced 14,218 metric tons (13,993 long tons) at full loading. She had a flush deck and a pronounced ram bow. Her superstructure included a small, armored conning tower forward with an open bridge atop it, along with a smaller, secondary conning tower aft. The ship was equipped with two heavy military masts. Her crew numbered 35 officers and 708 enlisted men.

The ship's propulsion system consisted of three triple-expansion steam engines that each drove a screw propeller. Steam was provided by twelve coal-burning Schulz-Thornycroft boilers that were vented through three funnels. The power-plant was rated to produce 17,524 indicated horsepower (13,068 kW) and a top speed of 18 knots (33 km/h; 21 mph). The ship had a fuel capacity of up to 1,540 metric tons (1,520 long tons) of coal. At a cruising speed of 10 knots (19 km/h; 12 mph), she could steam for 4,520 nautical miles (8,370 km; 5,200 mi).

Hannover's primary armament consisted of four 28 cm (11 in) SK L/40 guns in two twin turrets, one on either end of the superstructure. (Note: In Imperial German Navy gun nomenclature, "SK" (Schnelladekanone) denotes that the gun is quick loading, while the L/40 denotes the length of the gun. In this case, the L/40 gun is 40 caliber, meaning that the gun is 40 times as long as it is in diameter.) HHer offensive armament was rounded out with a secondary battery of fourteen 17 cm (6.7 in) SK L/40 guns mounted individually in casemates. A battery of twenty 8.8 cm (3.5 in) SK L/45 guns in single mounts provided defense against torpedo boats. These were distributed along the ship, including in sponsons in the bow and stern and in the superstructure. The ship was also armed with six 45 cm (17.7 in) torpedo tubes, all submerged in the hull. One was in the bow, one in the stern, and four on the broadside.

Hannover was protected with Krupp cemented armor. Her armor belt was 240 mm (9.4 in) thick amidships in the citadel, tapering to 100 mm (3.9 in) forward and aft, all backed with 80 Mm (49,709.7 mi) of teak planking. She had a curved armor deck that angled down at the sides to connect to the bottom of the belt armor. The deck was 40 mm (1.6 in) thick on the flat section and increased to 67–94 mm (2.6–3.7 in) on the sloped sides. The main battery turrets had 280 mm (11.0 in) thick sides, and her secondary casemates had 170 mm (6.7 in) of armor plate on their exposed sides. Her main conning tower received the heaviest protection, with sides that were 300 mm (11.8 in) thick.

== Service ==
=== Peacetime ===
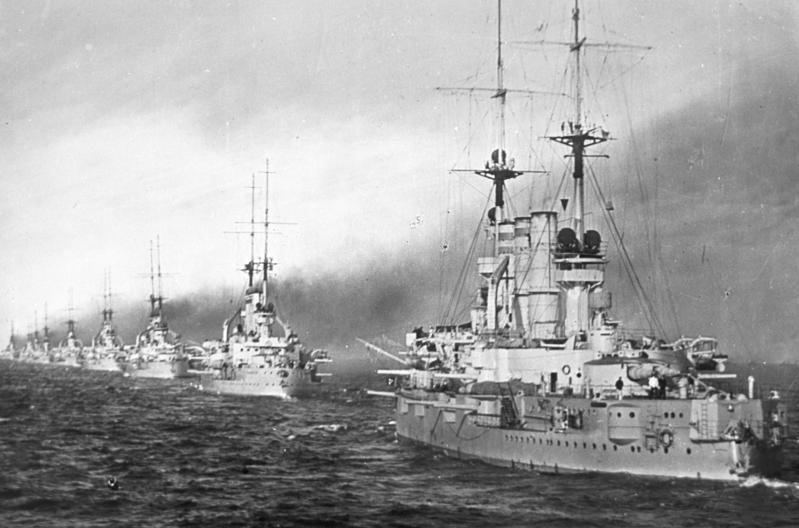
Elements of the High Seas Fleet, including the five Deutschland-class battleships in line ahead

Funds for the construction of a second member of the Deutschland class were included in the 1904 budget. The contract for the new vessel was awarded to the Kaiserliche Werft (Imperial Shipyard) in Wilhelmshaven on 1 June 1904 under the contract name "P", which denoted an addition to the fleet. (Note: German warships were ordered under provisional names. Additions to the fleet were given a single letter; ships intended to replace older or lost vessels were ordered as "Ersatz (name of the ship to be replaced)".) Hannover was laid down on 7 November. The experiences of the Russo-Japanese War, then being fought, suggested that naval armor was too thin to protect against modern guns, and so the German designers increased the thickness of the main belt and the central citadel; this change was repeated in the three subsequent members of the class. The ship was launched on 29 May 1905, and the President of the Province of Hanover, Richard von Wentzel, gave the speech. After completing fitting out, the ship was commissioned for sea trials on 1 October 1907, but they were interrupted so that Hannover could join the fleet exercises in the Skagerrak in November. Trials resumed after the maneuvers were completed, and by 13 February 1908 Hannover was ready to join the active fleet.

She was assigned to II Battle Squadron of the High Seas Fleet, joining her sisters Deutschland and Pommern; she replaced the older battleship Brandenburg. From May to June 1908, Hannover took part in maneuvers in the North Sea. From the following month until August, the fleet conducted a training cruise into the Atlantic. During the cruise, Hannover stopped in Ponta Delgada in the Azores, part of Portugal, from 23 July to 1 August. The annual autumn exercises began in September; after these were completed, Hannover was transferred to I Squadron, where she served as the flagship for two years. At the time, the squadron commander was VAdm Henning von Holtzendorff, and the unit consisted of the battleships Schlesien, Mecklenburg, Zähringen, Wettin, Wittelsbach, Kaiser Karl der Grosse, and Kaiser Barbarossa, along with the old aviso Blitz in use as a tender. In November, fleet and unit exercises were conducted in the Baltic Sea.

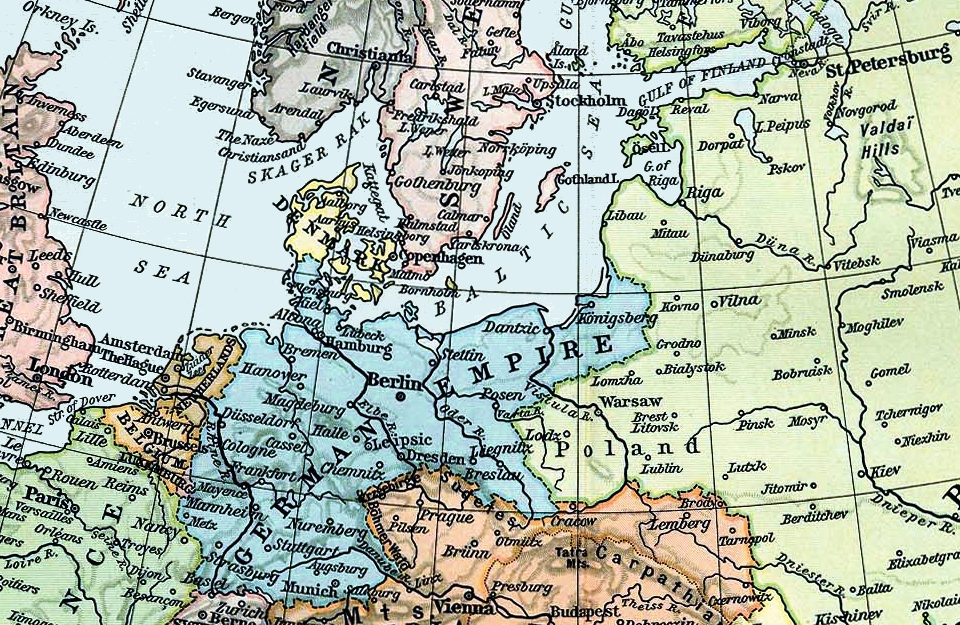
Map of the North and Baltic Seas in 1911

The training regimen in which Hannover participated followed a similar pattern over the next five years. This included another cruise into the Atlantic, from 7 July to 1 August 1909, followed immediately by the annual autumn maneuvers in August and September. On 1 October, VAdm Hugo von Pohl replaced Holtzendorff as the squadron commander aboard Hannover. The squadron conducted exercises in February 1910, and on 1 April the unit was transferred from Kiel to Wilhelmshaven. On its arrival, the squadron was reinforced by the new dreadnought battleships Nassau and Westfalen, which replaced Kaiser Karl der Grosse and Kaiser Barbarossa, respectively. Westfalen also replaced Hannover as the squadron's flagship; she later replaced Wittelsbach as the flagship of the squadron's deputy commander, Konteradmiral (KAdm – Rear Admiral) Günther von Krosigk. The ship won the Kaiser's Schießpreis (Shooting Prize) for excellent gunnery in I Squadron after the annual maneuvers. The squadron ended the year with further exercises in the Baltic and the Kattegat in October and November.

Krosigk was replaced by KAdm Karl Zimmerman in January 1911. Hannover took part in fleet maneuvers in the North Sea in May, a fleet cruise to Norwegian waters in July and early August, and the annual maneuvers in August and September. The dreadnought Posen, which had by then joined the squadron, replaced Hannover as the deputy command flagship on 3 October, and the dreadnought Helgoland took her place in the squadron, allowing Hannover to be transferred back to II Squadron, based in Kiel. She took part in training with II Squadron in November and from February through April 1912. She then took Braunschweig's place as the deputy command flagship on 27 April, and KAdm Ehrhard Schmidt hoisted his flag aboard the ship that day. Fleet maneuvers in the North and Baltic Seas followed. Because of the Agadir Crisis with Britain and France, the summer cruise in July went only to the Baltic to avoid exposing the fleet to a possible attack. The autumn maneuvers took place as usual in August and September, after which KAdm Wilhelm von Souchon replaced Schmidt.

The year 1913 followed a pattern similar to 1912, though the summer cruise returned to Norway that year. After the autumn maneuvers, Souchon was relieved by Kapitän zur See (KzS – Captain at Sea) Franz Mauve so he could be sent to command the Mediterranean Division. Hannover joined the rest of the fleet for maneuvers in the Baltic in November that year. The year 1914 began as previous years had, with squadron training. On 14 July, the annual summer cruise to Norway began. The threat of war during the July Crisis caused Kaiser Wilhelm II to end the cruise early, after only two weeks, and by the end of July the fleet was back in port, preparing for hostilities. War between Austria-Hungary and Serbia broke out on the 28th, and in the span of a week all of the major European powers had joined the conflict. At midnight on 4 August, the United Kingdom declared war on Germany for violating Belgium's neutrality.

=== World War I ===
Following the outbreak of World War I, Hannover was tasked with guard duty in the Altenbruch roadstead at the mouth of the Elbe River during the period of mobilization for the rest of the fleet. In late October, the ships were sent to Kiel to have modifications made to their underwater protection systems to make them more resistant to torpedoes and mines. Hannover then joined the battleship support for the battlecruisers that bombarded Scarborough, Hartlepool, and Whitby on 15–16 December 1914. During the operation, the German battle fleet of 12 dreadnoughts and eight pre-dreadnoughts came within 10 nmi (19 km; 12 mi) of an isolated squadron of six British battleships. However, skirmishes between the rival destroyer screens in the darkness convinced the German fleet commander, VAdm Friedrich von Ingenohl, that the entire Grand Fleet was deployed before him. Under orders from Wilhelm II to avoid battle if victory was not certain, Ingenohl broke off the engagement and turned the battle fleet back towards Germany.

Hannover put to sea during the Battle of Dogger Bank on 24 January 1915 to support the beleaguered German battlecruisers, but quickly returned to port. On 17–18 April, Hannover supported a minelaying operation off the Swarte Bank by the light cruisers of II Reconnaissance Group. A fleet advance to the Dogger Bank followed on 21–22 April. On 16 May, Hannover was sent to Kiel to have one of her 28 cm guns replaced. The ship returned to Kiel on 28 June to have supplemental oil firing installed for her boilers; work lasted until 12 July. KzS Gottfried von Dalwigk zu Lichtenfels replaced Mauve on 11 August, raising his flag aboard Hannover on the 20th. On 11–12 September, II Reconnaissance Group conducted another minelaying operation off the Swarte Bank with Hannover and the rest of II Squadron in support. This was followed by another fruitless sweep by the fleet on 23–24 October. During the fleet advance of 5–7 March 1916, Hannover and the rest of II Squadron remained in the German Bight, ready to sail in support. They then rejoined the fleet during the operation to bombard Yarmouth and Lowestoft on 24–25 April. During this operation, the battlecruiser Seydlitz was damaged by a British mine and had to return to port prematurely. Visibility was poor, so the operation was quickly called off before the British fleet could intervene.

==== Battle of Jutland ====
Diagram of the Battle of Jutland showing the major movements

Admiral Reinhard Scheer, the commander of the German fleet, immediately planned another advance into the North Sea, but the damage to Seydlitz delayed the operation until the end of May. Hannover was the flagship in IV Division of II Battle Squadron, which was positioned at the rear of the German line. II Battle Squadron was commanded by Mauve. On 31 May, at 02:00 CET, Hipper's battlecruisers steamed out towards the Skagerrak, followed by the rest of the High Seas Fleet an hour and a half later. During the "Run to the North", Scheer ordered the fleet to pursue the retreating battleships of the British V Battle Squadron at top speed. Hannover and her sisters were significantly slower than the faster dreadnoughts and quickly fell behind. During this period, Scheer directed Hannover to place herself at the rear of the German line, so he would have a flagship on either end of the formation. By 19:30, the Grand Fleet had arrived on the scene and confronted Scheer with significant numerical superiority. The German fleet was severely hampered by the presence of the slower Deutschland-class ships; if Scheer ordered an immediate turn towards Germany, he would have to sacrifice the slower ships to make good his escape.

Scheer decided to reverse the course of the fleet with the Gefechtskehrtwendung (battle about turn), a maneuver that required every unit in the German line to turn 180° simultaneously. As a result of their having fallen behind, the ships of II Battle Squadron could not conform to the new course following the turn. Hannover and the other five ships of the squadron were, therefore, located on the disengaged side of the German line. Mauve considered moving his ships to the rear of the line, astern of III Battle Squadron dreadnoughts, but decided against it when he realized the movement would interfere with the maneuvering of Admiral Franz von Hipper's battlecruisers. Instead, he attempted to place his ships at the head of the line.

Later on the first day of the battle, the hard-pressed battlecruisers of I Scouting Group were being pursued by their British opponents. Hannover and the other so-called "five-minute ships" came to their aid by steaming in between the opposing battlecruiser squadrons. (Note: The men of the German navy referred to the ships as "five-minute ships" because that was the length of time they were expected to survive if confronted by a dreadnought.) The ships were only very briefly engaged, owing in large part to the poor visibility. Hannover fired eight rounds from her 28 cm guns during this period. The British battlecruiser HMS Princess Royal fired on Hannover several times until the latter was obscured by smoke. Hannover was struck once by fragments from one of the 13.5-inch (34 cm) shells fired by Princess Royal. Mauve decided it would be inadvisable to continue the fight against the much more powerful battlecruisers, and so ordered an 8-point turn to starboard.

Late on the 31st, the fleet organized for the night voyage back to Germany; Deutschland, Pommern, and Hannover fell in behind König and the other dreadnoughts of III Battle Squadron towards the rear of the line. Hannover was then joined by the other members of her unit: Hessen, Schlesien, and Schleswig-Holstein. Hessen situated herself between Hannover and Pommern, while the other two ships fell in at the rear of the line. Shortly after 01:00, the leading ships of the German line came into contact with the armored cruiser HMS Black Prince, which was quickly destroyed in a hail of gunfire from the German dreadnoughts. Nassau was forced to fall out of line to avoid the sinking British ship, and an hour later rejoined the formation directly ahead of Hannover. At around 03:00, British destroyers conducted a series of attacks against the fleet, some of which targeted Hannover. Shortly thereafter, Pommern was struck by at least one torpedo from the destroyer Onslaught; the hit detonated an ammunition magazine which destroyed the ship in a tremendous explosion. Hannover was astern of Pommern and was forced to turn hard to starboard to avoid the wreck. Simultaneously, a third torpedo from Onslaught passed closely astern of Hannover, which forced the ship to turn away. Shortly after 04:00, Hannover and several other ships fired repeatedly at what were thought to be submarines; in one instance, the firing from Hannover and Hessen nearly damaged the light cruisers Stettin and München, which prompted Scheer to order them to cease firing. Hannover and several other ships again fired at imaginary submarines shortly before 06:00.

Despite the ferocity of the night fighting, the High Seas Fleet punched through the British destroyer forces and reached Horns Reef by 04:00 on 1 June. The German fleet reached Wilhelmshaven a few hours later, where the undamaged dreadnoughts of the Nassau and Helgoland classes took up defensive positions while the damaged ships and the survivors of II Squadron retreated within the harbor. Over the course of the battle, Hannover had fired eight 28 cm shells, twenty-one 17 cm rounds, and forty-four shells from her 8.8 cm guns. She emerged from the battle completely unscathed.

==== Later actions ====
The experience at Jutland convinced Scheer that the pre-dreadnoughts of II Squadron could no longer be used as front-line battleships. Accordingly, they were detached from the High Seas Fleet and returned to guard duty in the Elbe. Now-KAdm Dalwigk zu Lichtenfels hauled down his flag on 30 November and a replacement was not appointed, though II Squadron remained in at least administrative existence until 15 August 1917. In the meantime, Hannover went to Kiel for maintenance on 4 November 1916 before resuming guard ship duties in the Elbe. From 10 February to 23 April 1917, she served as the flagship for VAdm Hubert von Rebeur-Paschwitz. During this period, on 21 March, the ship had some of her guns removed. From 25 June to 16 September, she was rebuilt to serve as a guard ship in the Danish Straits; she began serving in this role on 27 September, replacing the battleship Lothringen.

Acts of insubordination began aboard the ship on 4 November 1918, as a wider mutiny aboard the High Seas Fleet spread from Wilhelmshaven to Kiel. On 11 November, Germany entered into the armistice with the Western Allies. According to the terms of the armistice, the most modern components of Germany's surface fleet were interned in the British naval base at Scapa Flow, while the rest of the fleet was demilitarized. On the day the armistice took effect, Hannover was sent briefly to Swinemünde, before returning to Kiel on 14–15 November along with Schlesien. Hannover was decommissioned a month later on 17 December in accordance with the terms of the armistice.

=== Postwar service ===
Following the German defeat in World War I, the German navy was reorganized as the Reichsmarine according to the Treaty of Versailles. The new navy was permitted to retain eight pre-dreadnought battleships under Article 181 – two of which would be in reserve – for coastal defense. This amounted to three of the Deutschland-class battleships—Hannover, Schleswig-Holstein and Schlesien—as well as the five Braunschweig-class battleships. Hannover was modernized between 1920 and 1921 to prepare her for active service with the fleet. On 10 February 1921, she was recommissioned as the flagship of the Commander of the Naval Forces of the Baltic Sea, KzS und Kommodore (KzS and Commodore) Hugo von Rosenberg. The unit was based in Swinemünde, and at the time it also included the light cruiser Medusa, the survey ship Panther, and I Torpedo-boat Flotilla. In June and July, the unit held the first major post-war exercises in the western Baltic. Later that year, Hannover visited Gotland. In March 1922, Hannover was tasked with clearing paths in the heavy sea ice in the eastern Baltic. On 1 April, she and the rest of the unit were transferred to Kiel. During night-fighting exercises on 23 May, Hannover collided with the torpedo boat S18, killing ten men aboard the torpedo boat. Later that year, during the summer training cruise, Hannover visited several ports in Finland, and in September she took part in major training exercises. She visited Stockholm from 18 to 22 October, where Rosenberg was received by Gustaf V of Sweden.

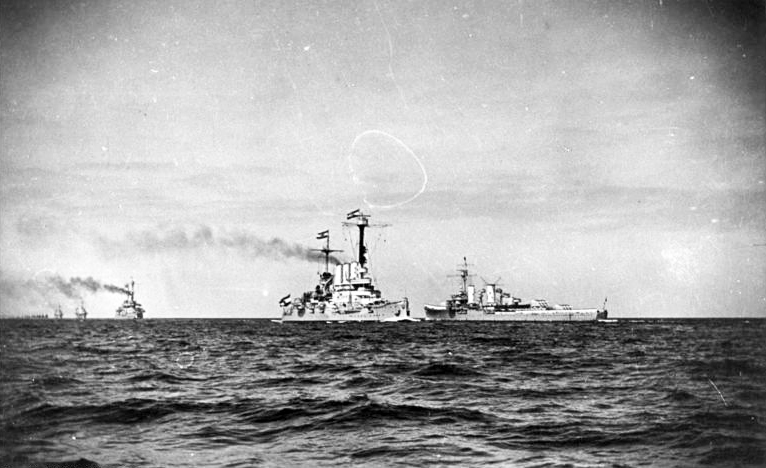
Ships of the Reichsmarine in 1929; either Hannover or Schleswig-Holstein is at center

In 1923, Hannover visited Örnsköldsvik and Karlskrona in Sweden. She lost her role as flagship on 22 September, and the fleet was reorganized from North Sea and Baltic Sea commands to create the Battleship Division, to which Hannover was assigned. In mid-1924, the Battleship Division made its first major overseas cruise to Spain, and Hannover stopped in Portugalete from 6 to 13 July. Paul Behncke, the commander of the Reichsmarine, came aboard the ship during the autumn maneuvers in August and September, which concluded with a fleet review off Hel, Poland, on 10 September. While en route from Wilhelmshaven to Kiel in December, Hannover collided with a tugboat that had been torn from its moorings. Hannover was damaged in the accident and water flooded the engine room, forcing her to return to Wilhelmshaven for repairs that lasted until February 1925. The fleet cruised Norwegian waters during the summer cruise and visited Oslo and Ulvik, and in September the ships conducted training in the North Sea. On 1 October, Hannover once again became a flagship, this time for the 2nd Admiral of the Battleship Division, KzS und Kommodore Wilhelm Prentzel. At that time, the active German fleet consisted of Hannover, Braunschweig, the light cruiser Amazone, and II Torpedo-boat Flotilla.

Hannover took part in several major cruises in 1926, the first of which, from 13 May to 18 June, went to Spain and the Mediterranean Sea. She visited the Spanish ports of Palma in Mallorca, Cartagena, and Vigo during the cruise. The second cruise took place from 28 June to 1 July, and took the ship to Helsingfors, Finland. From 4 to 5 September, the fleet cruised in the Skagen, before beginning another Atlantic cruise on 11 October. During the voyage, Hannover stopped in Funchal, Las Palmas, Porto de Preia, Santa Cruz de la Palma, Villagarcia, and Amsterdam. The fleet returned to Germany on 16 December, and on 1 March 1927, Hannover was decommissioned for modernization and repairs, her place in the active fleet being taken by Schlesien. The ship received a new mast, but unlike her sisters kept her original three funnels. She was recommissioned on 25 January 1930 and rejoined the Battleship Division. She took part in the cruise to the Mediterranean that began on 2 April. She made stops in Vigo, Valencia, Messina, Athens, Argostolion, Palma de Mallorca, and Cádiz before arriving back in Wilhelmshaven on 18 June.

Hannover took part in a large fleet parade in the Baltic on 20 May 1931 for President Paul von Hindenburg. She made her last trip abroad in June, when she visited Bergen, Norway. She participated in the autumn maneuvers that year, which concluded with a naval review for the outgoing fleet commander, VAdm Iwan Oldekop, on 11 September. During the maneuvers, Erich Raeder, the chief of the Reichsmarine, came aboard the ship. The ship thereafter went to Kiel, where she was decommissioned on 25 September. The ship was struck from the naval register in 1936, after which the navy intended to rebuild Hannover for use as a target ship. The conversion never occurred. Instead, she was used in explosive tests. Ultimately, the ship was broken up between May 1944 and October 1946 in Bremerhaven. Her bell now resides in the Military History Museum of the Bundeswehr in Dresden.
