= Memel Nord Battery =

1939 fortification in Klaipėda, Lithuania

Coordinates: 55°46′41″N 21°04′26″E

The observation/ range finding post. The bunker was heavily reinforced because it sat out in the open. The 2 structures on top of the bunker have been demolished.

Memel Battery Nord is a Nazi German fortification constructed in the Lithuanian town of Klaipėda, along the Baltic coast. After World War I, the town was set up as a free city under a French protectorate, but the French and Lithuanians cooperated to stage a revolt where Lithuania took control of the city. In March 1939, the German pre-dreadnought battleship Schleswig-Holstein arrived with 225 marines and occupied the city. The German navy then began to fortify the city, which included Memel Battery Nord.

== Description ==
The observation/ range finding bunker on the left. it is possible to faintly see part of the second battery in the center behind the dune. On the far right up the hill you can see part of the first battery.

After Nazi Germany occupied Klaipeda (then called Memel) in March 1939, they drew up plans for 2 anti-ship batteries, called Battery Sud (South) and Battery Nord (North). During the construction of the batteries, makeshift naval batteries were built along the coast. Only Battery Nord was completed, Battery Sud was in the process of completion when it was decided that it was no longer needed. Battery Nord was armed with four 15 cm naval guns in open-air barbettes, facing North-West. The four guns were 15 cm SKL-45 flat-trajectory guns. The total battery consisted of two battery blocks with two guns each, a fire control building in between, an ammo depot for 150 shells near each battery, and a power station.

The fire control building was located on the beach in front of the guns, and since it was out in the open, was heavily reinforced with concrete and steel. On the top are 3 armored observation domes used for spotting ships, and the highest was for calibrating their range and heading using a 6 m wide rangefinder. Battery Nord is one of only two naval batteries in Lithuania, the other being Nord Mole Battery, a little bit south of the Nord Battery. In 1942, the 15 cm guns were removed and replaced by 12.8 cm anti-aircraft guns.

== History ==
In March and April 1939, several field positions were constructed for naval artillery near Klaipeda. It was decided in December 1939 that permanent batteries need to be constructed to counter a possible Allied naval attack. The planning started in December, and the construction started in March 1940. The battery was completed later that year but did not see any action due to the German occupation of Denmark and Norway. During Germany's invasion of the Soviet Union in June 1941, a Soviet bomber aircraft scored a direct hit on the 4th gun's ammo storage, which completely demolished that half of the building. In 1942, the four 15 cm guns were transferred to Norway to become part MKB 6/510, a naval battery near the port of Bodø. After the naval guns had left, four 17-ton 12.8 cm anti-aircraft guns were placed where the naval guns used to be. The demolished gun position 4 was rebuilt and a 12.8 cm gun was placed on top of the battery. When the guns were installed, the name was officially changed to Försterei. After World War II ended, the battery was abandoned by Soviet authorities. After the fall of the Soviet Union in 1991 and the Independence of Lithuania, homeless people began living in the remains of the battery. That went on until 2002, when local enthusiasts began taking care of it, and in 2009, a museum was installed in the remains of the battery. In January 2009, the 8 m barrel of a 12.8 cm anti-aircraft gun was found in the sand near the battery. In 2018, the Border Guards' Club cleaned up surrounding vegetation and installed signs for a walking tour of the bunker complex and its surroundings.

The 12.8cm gun barrel which was found in 2009. The barrel is 8 m long, and the gun it was mounted on weighed 17 imperial tons.
