= SMS Braunschweig =

Battleship of the German Imperial Navy

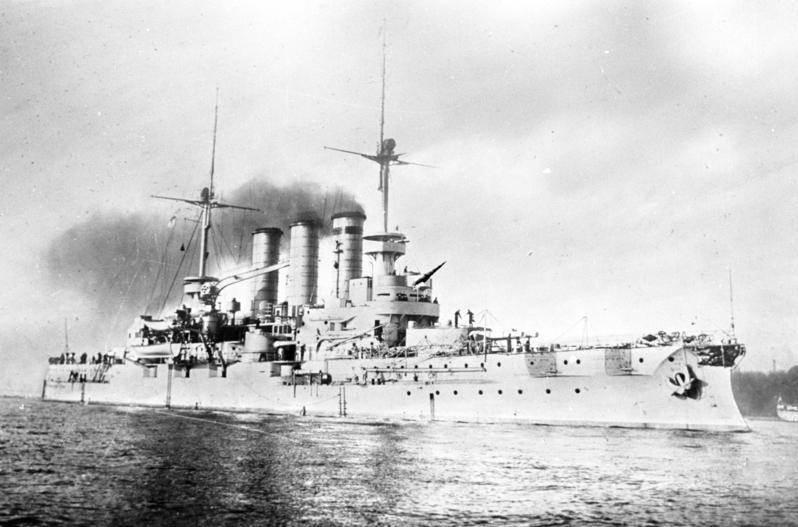
- SMS Braunschweig

History

Germany
- Name: Braunschweig
- Namesake: Braunschweig
- Builder: Germaniawerft, Kiel
- Laid down: 24 October 1901
- Launched: 20 December 1902
- Commissioned: 15 October 1904
- Stricken: 31 March 1931
- Fate: Scrapped after 31 March 1931

General characteristics
- Class & type: Braunschweig-class battleship
- Displacement: Normal: 13,208 t (12,999 long tons); Full load: 14,394 t (14,167 long tons)
- Length: 127.7 m (419 ft) (loa)
- Beam: 22.2 m (73 ft)
- Draft: 8.1 m (27 ft)
- Installed power: 16,000 metric horsepower (15,781 ihp; 11,768 kW); 8 × water-tube boilers; 6 × cylindrical boilers
- Propulsion: 3 × triple-expansion steam engines; 3 × screw propellers
- Speed: 18 knots (33 km/h; 21 mph)
- Range: 5,200 nautical miles (9,600 km; 6,000 mi); 10 knots (20 km/h; 10 mph)
- Complement: 35 officers; 708 enlisted men
- Armament: 4 × 28 cm (11 in) SK L/40 guns; 14 × 17 cm (6.7 in) SK L/40 guns; 18 × 8.8 cm (3.5 in) SK L/35 guns; 6 × 45 cm (17.7 in) torpedo tubes
- Armor: Belt: 110 to 250 mm (4.3 to 9.8 in); Turrets: 250 mm (9.8 in); Deck: 40 mm (1.6 in)

SMS Braunschweig (Note: "SMS" stands for "Seiner Majestät Schiff" (English: His Majesty's Ship).) was the first of five pre-dreadnought battleships of the Braunschweig class built for the German Kaiserliche Marine (Imperial Navy). She was laid down in October 1901, launched in December 1902, and commissioned in October 1904. She was named after the Duchy of Brunswick (German: Braunschweig). The ship was armed with a battery of four 28 cm (11 in) guns and had a top speed of 18 knots (33 km/h; 21 mph). Like all other pre-dreadnoughts built at the turn of the century, Braunschweig was quickly made obsolete by the launching of the revolutionary HMS Dreadnought in 1906; as a result, her career as a front-line battleship was cut short.

The ship served in II Squadron of the German fleet after entering service. During this period, she was occupied with extensive annual training, as well as making good-will visits to foreign countries. She also served as a flagship for most of her pre-war career. Surpassed by new dreadnought battleships, Braunschweig was decommissioned in 1913, but reactivated a year later following the outbreak of World War I. She was assigned to IV Battle Squadron, which operated in both the North Sea, protecting the German coast, and the Baltic Sea, where it opposed the Russian Baltic Fleet. Braunschweig saw action during the Battle of the Gulf of Riga in August 1915, when she engaged the Russian battleship Slava.

By late 1915, crew shortages and the threat from British submarines forced the Kaiserliche Marine to withdraw older battleships like Braunschweig, and she spent the rest of the war first as a headquarters ship, then as a training ship, and finally as a barracks ship. Under the terms of the Treaty of Versailles, she was retained after the end of the war and modernized in 1921–22. Braunschweig served in the reformed Reichsmarine, operating as the flagship of naval forces assigned to the North Sea. She made several cruises abroad, including a voyage into the Atlantic in 1924. The ship was decommissioned again in January 1926 and was stricken from the Navy Directory in March 1931, hulked, and subsequently broken up for scrap.

== Design ==
Plan and profile drawing of the Braunschweig class

With the passage of the Second Naval Law under the direction of Vizeadmiral (VAdm—Vice Admiral) Alfred von Tirpitz in 1900, funding was allocated for a new class of battleships, to succeed the Wittelsbach-class ships authorized under the 1898 Naval Law. By this time, Krupp, the supplier of naval artillery to the Kaiserliche Marine (Imperial Navy) had developed quick-firing, 28-centimeter (11 in) guns; the largest guns that had previously incorporated the technology were the 24 cm (9.4 in) guns mounted on the Wittelsbachs. The Design Department of the Reichsmarineamt (Imperial Navy Office) adopted these guns for the new battleships, along with an increase from 15 cm (5.9 in) to 17 cm (6.7 in) for the secondary battery, owing to the increased threat from torpedo boats as torpedoes became more effective.

Though the Braunschweig class marked a significant improvement over earlier German battleships, its design fell victim to the rapid pace of technological development in the early 1900s. The British battleship HMS Dreadnought—armed with ten 12-inch (30.5 cm) guns—was commissioned in December 1906. Dreadnought's revolutionary design rendered every capital ship of the German navy obsolete, including Braunschweig.

Braunschweig was 127.7 m (419 ft) long overall and had a beam of 22.20 m (72 ft 10 in) and a draft of 8.10 m (26 ft 7 in) forward. She displaced 13,208 t (12,999 long tons) as designed and 14,394 t (14,167 long tons) at full load. Her crew consisted of 35 officers and 708 enlisted men. The ship was powered by three 3-cylinder vertical triple-expansion engines that drove three screws. Steam was provided by eight naval and six cylindrical boilers, all of which burned coal. Braunschweig's powerplant was rated at 16,000 indicated horsepower (12,000 kW), which generated a top speed of 18 knots (33 km/h; 21 mph). She could steam 5,200 nautical miles (9,600 km; 6,000 mi) at a cruising speed of 10 knots (19 km/h; 12 mph).

Braunschweig's armament consisted of a main battery of four 28 cm (11 in) SK L/40 guns in twin-gun turrets, (Note: In Imperial German Navy gun nomenclature, "SK" (Schnelladekanone) denotes that the gun is quick firing, while the L/40 denotes the length of the gun. In this case, the L/40 gun is 40 caliber, meaning that the gun is 40 times as long as it is in diameter.) one fore and one aft of the central superstructure. Her secondary armament consisted of fourteen 17 cm (6.7 inch) SK L/40 guns and eighteen 8.8 cm (3.45 in) SK L/35 quick-firing guns. The armament suite was rounded out with six 45 cm (17.7 in) torpedo tubes, all mounted submerged in the hull. One tube was in the bow, two were on each broadside, and the final tube was in the stern. Braunschweig was protected with Krupp armor. Her armored belt was 110 to 225 millimeters (4.3 to 8.9 in) thick, with the heavier armor in the central citadel that protected her magazines and propulsion machinery spaces, and the thinner plating at either end of the hull. Her deck was 40 mm (1.6 in) thick. The main battery turrets had 250 mm of armor plating.

== Service history ==
Braunschweig at her launching on 20 December 1902

=== Construction to 1914 ===
Braunschweig was laid down on 24 October 1901 at the Germaniawerft shipyard in Kiel under construction number 97. The first of her class, she was ordered under the contract name "H" as a new unit for the fleet. (Note: German warships were ordered under provisional names. Additions to the fleet were given a single letter; ships intended to replace older or lost vessels were ordered as "Ersatz (name of the ship to be replaced)".) The Braunschweig class, which took its name from the lead ship, included four other vessels: Elsass, Hessen, Preussen, and Lothringen. The ship was launched on 20 December 1902 and was named for the Duchy of Braunschweig by Prince Albert of Prussia, Regent of the Duchy. She was commissioned into the fleet on 15 October 1904, and then began sea trials, which lasted to the end of December. She had already been assigned to II Squadron of the main fleet on 25 September, taking the place of the old coastal defense ship Odin, though she did not formally join the unit until after trials concluded in late December. Upon joining the squadron, she replaced the battleship Wörth as the flagship of Konteradmiral (KAdm—Rear Admiral) Alfred Breusing, the squadron's deputy commander.

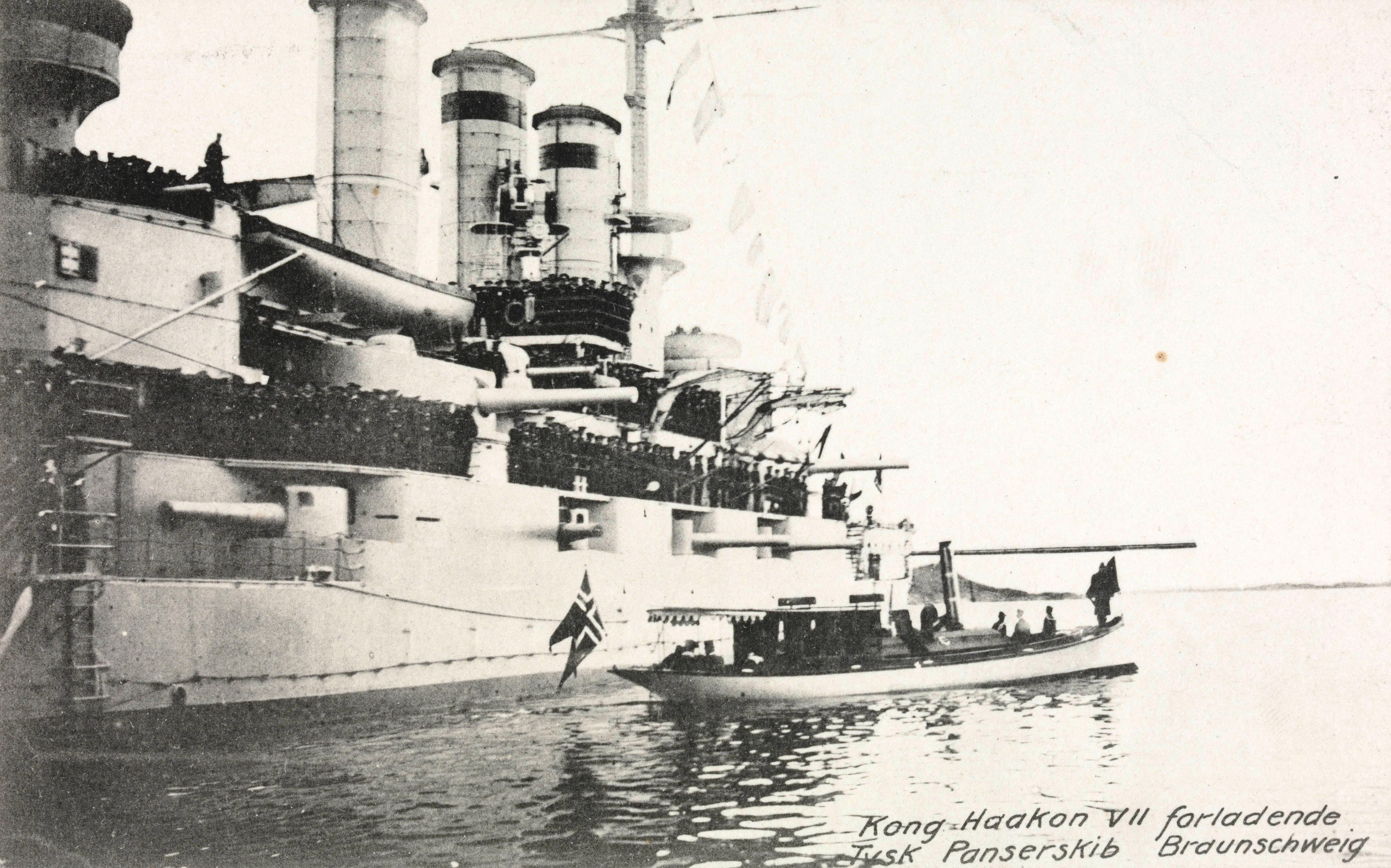
Braunschweig with King Haakon VII's boat alongside on 28 November 1905

For the next several years, Braunschweig and the rest of the fleet were occupied with the peacetime training regimen that consisted of squadron and fleet training in April and May, a major fleet cruise in June and July, followed by annual fall maneuvers with the whole fleet in August and September. The year would typically conclude with a winter training cruise. During torpedo training on 16 February 1905, Wörth ran aground off Stollergrund; Braunschweig unsuccessfully attempted to pull her free and other ships were called to come to Wörth's aid. In August, before the annual fleet maneuvers, the British Channel Fleet visited the German fleet in Swinemünde. On 22 November, Prince Heinrich boarded the ship in Kiel, which then steamed to Denmark to take Prince Carl of Denmark to Norway, where he was crowned Haakon VII of Norway. Braunschweig was back in Kiel by 30 November. On 14 December, Braunschweig was replaced as the deputy commander's flagship by the battleship Kurfürst Friedrich Wilhelm, which had larger facilities for a command staff.

The year 1906 followed the same pattern, concluding with fleet exercises in the North Sea in December before returning to Kiel. Braunschweig resumed deputy flagship duties on 25 September 1907, when KAdm Adolf Paschen transferred his flag from Kurfürst Friedrich Wilhelm, which was to be decommissioned. Further maneuvers in the North Sea occupied the fleet for much of the first half of 1907, followed by a summer cruise to Norway and the annual autumn maneuvers in August and September. In 1908 and 1909, the fleet, which had been renamed the High Seas Fleet, undertook major cruises into the Atlantic Ocean. During the first, which began on 13 July 1908, Braunschweig stopped in Las Palmas from 23 July to 7 August before returning to Germany on 13 August for the autumn maneuvers. The 1909 cruise began on 7 July and lasted until 1 August, and included a visit to A Coruña, Spain, from 18 to 27 July. In September 1909, after the conclusion of the autumn fleet maneuvers, the crew from Braunschweig was sent to form the core of the new dreadnought battleship Westfalen, while the crew from Kaiser Karl der Grosse was sent to Braunschweig.

The fleet held training exercises in the Kattegat in May 1910. For the summer cruises of 1910 and 1911, the German fleet went to Norwegian waters; both years also saw winter cruises in the western Baltic. On 26 April 1912, Braunschweig was relieved as the deputy flagship by the battleship Hannover. That year, Braunschweig did not take part in the summer training cruise, instead having her crew temporarily reduced. More sailors arrived on 8 December, allowing her to return to active service with V Division of III Squadron, under the command of KAdm Ehrhard Schmidt. She took part in a winter training cruise in February and March 1913, along with exercises in the North Sea in May. The ship's return to service proved to be short-lived; on 30 July her crew was reduced a second time in Kiel, now to man the new battleship König Albert. Braunschweig was assigned to the Reserve Division of the Baltic Sea as an inactive vessel.

=== World War I ===
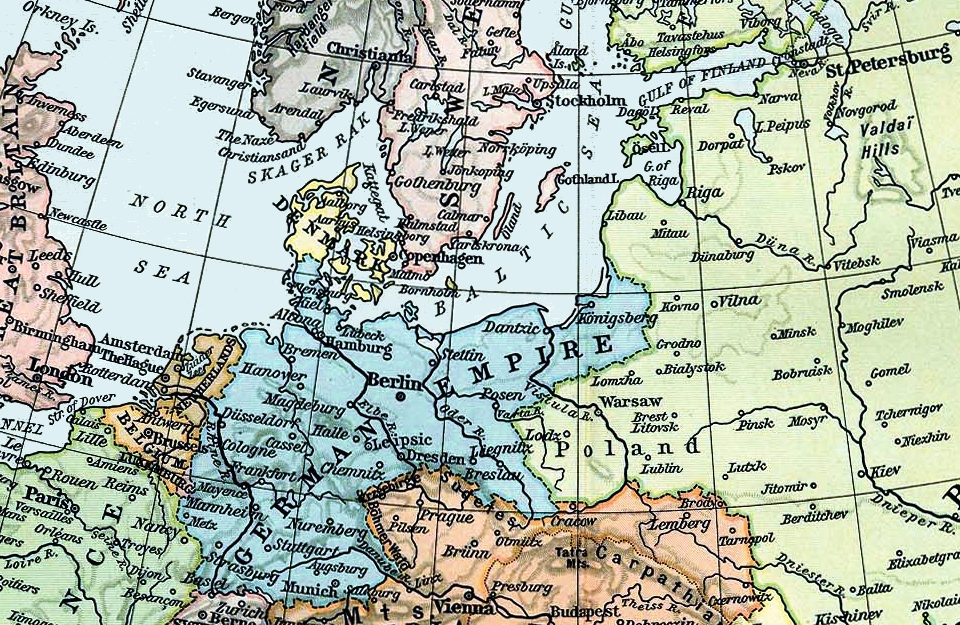
Map of the North and Baltic Seas in 1911

On 28 July 1914, Germany's ally, Austria-Hungary, declared war on Serbia, beginning World War I. That day, Braunschweig and the rest of the Reserve Division were reactivated for wartime service. The ship was recommissioned on 1 August and joined IV Battle Squadron, which also included her sister ship Elsass and the five Wittelsbach-class battleships, and was commanded by Schmidt, who had by now been promoted to Vizeadmiral. The next day KAdm Hermann Alberts, the deputy commander of the squadron, came aboard the ship, making her his flagship. The installation of necessary equipment was completed by 7 August, and the IV Squadron ships were ready for operations four days later. Braunschweig began individual and then squadron training, which lasted until early September. The training exercises were interrupted on 26 August, when the ships were sent to rescue the stranded light cruiser Magdeburg, which had run aground off the island of Odensholm in the eastern Baltic. By 28 August, the ship's crew had been forced to detonate explosives to destroy Magdeburg before the relief force had arrived. As a result, Braunschweig and the rest of the squadron returned to Bornholm that day for further training exercises.

Starting on 3 September, IV Squadron, assisted by the armored cruiser Blücher, conducted a sweep into the Baltic. The operation lasted until 9 September and failed to bring Russian naval units to battle. Following the operation, Braunschweig was tasked with coastal defense in the North Sea around the mouth of the Elbe. On 12 September, an accidental explosion aboard the ship killed six men and wounded sixteen more, but only lightly damaged the ship. Later that month, the IV Squadron ships were transferred back to the Baltic. The army had requested that the navy make a demonstration to keep Russian reserves along the Baltic coast, instead of allowing the Russians to re-deploy them to Galicia. On 21 September, Alberts transferred his flag to the battleship Schwaben. The following day, Prince Heinrich, the commander-in-chief of naval forces in the Baltic, came aboard Braunschweig, making her his flagship for the operation, which was also to include the older pre-dreadnought battleships of the V Battle Squadron. These ships were sent to Danzig to embark ground forces, while Braunschweig and IV Squadron steamed in advance. The operation was called off early, after British submarines were reportedly sighted in the Baltic. The two squadrons rendezvoused off Bornholm before proceeded on to Kiel, arriving on 26 September.

Braunschweig underway, steaming at high speed

From 5 December 1914 to 2 March 1915, Braunschweig was occupied with guard ship duties in the mouth of the Elbe. On 6 May, the IV Squadron ships were tasked with providing support to the assault on Libau (in modern Latvia). Braunschweig and the other ships were stationed off Gotland to intercept any Russian cruisers that might attempt to intervene in the landings; the Russians, however, did not do so. On 10 May, the British submarines HMS E1 and HMS E9 spotted IV Squadron, but were too far away to attack them. Another stint in the Elbe followed from 28 May to 3 July. The next day, following the loss of the minelaying cruiser SMS Albatross in the Baltic, the IV Squadron ships were transferred to reinforce the German naval forces in the area. The army had again requested naval assistance, this time to support operations around Libau. On 7 July, Braunschweig left Kiel, bound for the eastern Baltic. On 11 and 19 July, German cruisers, with the IV Squadron ships in support, conducted sweeps in the Baltic, though without engaging Russian forces.

In August 1915, the German fleet attempted to clear the Gulf of Riga of Russian naval forces, to aid the German Army advancing on the city. IV Squadron was joined by I Battle Squadron, which consisted of the eight Nassau and Helgoland-class battleships, from the High Seas Fleet, along with three battlecruisers and a host of smaller craft. The task force was placed under command of VAdm Franz von Hipper, though operational command remained with Schmidt. On the morning of 8 August, the Germans made their initial push into the Gulf; Braunschweig and Elsass were tasked with engaging the Russian pre-dreadnought Slava and preventing her from disrupting the German minesweepers. When it became clear that the minesweepers could not clear the minefield before nightfall, Schmidt called off the attempt. A second attempt was made on 16 August; this time, Braunschweig remained outside the Gulf while the dreadnoughts Nassau and Posen took over the task of dealing with Slava. By 19 August, the Russian minefields had been cleared and the flotilla entered the Gulf. Reports of Allied submarines in the area prompted the Germans to call off the operation the following day.

Braunschweig remained in Libau until late September, when she was recalled to Kiel, arriving on the 23rd. Two days later, she resumed guard ship duty in the mouth of the Elbe, which lasted until 4 October. She returned to Kiel the next day, and on 12 October was deployed back to Libau to guard the port, along with Elsass and Mecklenburg. On 12 October, the British submarine E18 fired a single torpedo at Braunschweig, though it failed to hit its target. On 14 December, Kaiser Wilhelm II visited the ship. By this point in the war, the Navy was encountering difficulties in manning more important vessels, and the insufficient underwater protection of the older German battleships rendered them unusable in the Baltic, owing to the threat from submarines. As a result, IV Squadron was dissolved and most of the ships were placed in reserve. Braunschweig, however, became the flagship of VAdm Friedrich Schultz, the Commander of Reconnaissance Forces in the Eastern Baltic Sea. On 5 January 1916, Braunschweig, Mecklenburg, the light cruiser Berlin, and the X Torpedo-boat Flotilla left Libau for Kiel before continuing on to Hamburg. There, Braunschweig underwent repairs at the Blohm & Voss shipyard, which lasted from 10 January to 26 February.

On 4 March, the ship arrived back in Libau, where she began her duties as Schultz's command ship. During this period, her crew was reduced to the point that she was only capable of providing harbor defense. In June, the naval command further reduced the number of ships operating in the Baltic, and Schultz, whose role had been taken over by the commander of the VI Scouting Group, left Braunschweig on 3 June. The ship left Libau for Kiel on 1 August, arriving there two days later. On 24 August, her crew was reduced further. She was thereafter used as a training ship for naval recruits, until 20 August 1917, when she was decommissioned and used as a barracks ship until the end of the war in November 1918. In this role, the ship supported III Submarine Flotilla.

=== Postwar career ===
Illustration of Braunschweig steaming at high speed

The Treaty of Versailles, which ended the war, specified that Germany was permitted to retain six battleships of the "Deutschland or Lothringen types." (Note: Treaty of Versailles Section II: Naval Clauses, Article 181.) (Note: This is a misidentification of the name of the class on the part of the treaty writers; Lothringen was a member of the Braunschweig class.) Braunschweig was chosen to remain on active service with the newly reformed Reichsmarine. The ship was modernized at the Reichsmarinewerft in Wilhelmshaven from 1921 to 1922. She was recommissioned on 1 December 1921, initially with a reduced crew, though work on the ship continued on into the following year. Work was finished and her crew was completed on 1 March 1922, at which point she replaced the light cruiser Hamburg as the flagship of the Marinestation der Nordsee (Naval Station of the North Sea), then commanded by KAdm Konrad Mommsen. At the time, the unit consisted of Braunschweig, Hamburg, the cruiser Arcona, and several torpedo boats. On 11 April, Mommsen was replaced by KAdm Theodor Püllen. In July, Braunschweig visited Norway, including stops in Fretheim from 8 to 13 July and Mundal from 13 to 17 July. From late August to 15 September, the ships of the Marinestation der Nordsee held joint maneuvers with those from the Marinestation der Ostsee (Naval Station of the Baltic Sea), and during these Reichspräsident (President of Germany) Friedrich Ebert came aboard the ship to observe the exercises on 5 and 6 September.

In 1923, Braunschweig's bridge was rebuilt and enlarged. The ship's program followed the same pattern as the previous year, with visits to foreign ports in July; Braunschweig stopped in Helsinki, Finland, and Gothenburg, Sweden, during her trip. Joint maneuvers were held again in August and September, after which Püllen left the ship. On 15 October, VAdm Hans Zenker, then the Oberbefehlshaber der Seestreitkräfte (O.d.S—Commander of Naval Forces), reorganized the fleet structure, disbanding the North Sea and Baltic commands and replacing them with organizations based on ship type. Braunschweig was now assigned to the Linienschiffsdivision (Battleship Division), where she served as Zenker's flagship. The division also included the battleship Hannover. In February and March 1924, the ship served as an icebreaker in the Baltic. The usual cruise abroad in July 1924 ventured further than in previous years, with a trip into the Atlantic. Braunschweig stopped in A Coruña from 6 to 13 July. Fleet maneuvers followed at the end of August, and at their conclusion, the fleet anchored off Sassnitz for a naval review for Admiral Paul Behncke, the retiring Chef der Admiralität (Chief of the Admiralty). Zenker was promoted to replace Behncke, who was in turn replaced by now-VAdm Mommsen, who again made Braunschweig his flagship. Further exercises were held from 29 September to 5 October.

On 1 April 1925, the command structure of the fleet was again reorganized, the O.d.S becoming the Flottenchef. The fleet was also expanded with the addition of the battleships Hessen and Elsass, though Braunschweig remained the flagship. Later that month, the battleships and cruisers of the fleet went on a cruise in the Baltic, and the summer cruise in June went to Norway. Braunschweig made stops in several cities, including Stavanger and Balholmen. Braunschweig was present during the Kiel Week sailing regatta, which also saw the visit of the Swedish fleet. On 31 January 1926, Brauschweig was decommissioned, her role as fleet flagship being taken by Schleswig-Holstein. On 31 March 1931, Braunschweig was stricken from the naval register and temporarily used as a hulk in Wilhelmshaven before being broken up for scrap.
