= Fretheim =

Fretheim is a surname. Notable people with the surname include:

- Terence E. Fretheim, American Old Testament scholar
- Thorstein Fretheim (1886–1971), Norwegian politician
- Thorsten Guttormsen Fretheim (1808–1874), Norwegian politician
- Tor Fretheim (1946–2018), Norwegian journalist and author of children's literature
