= SMS Schleswig-Holstein =

Battleship of the German Imperial Navy

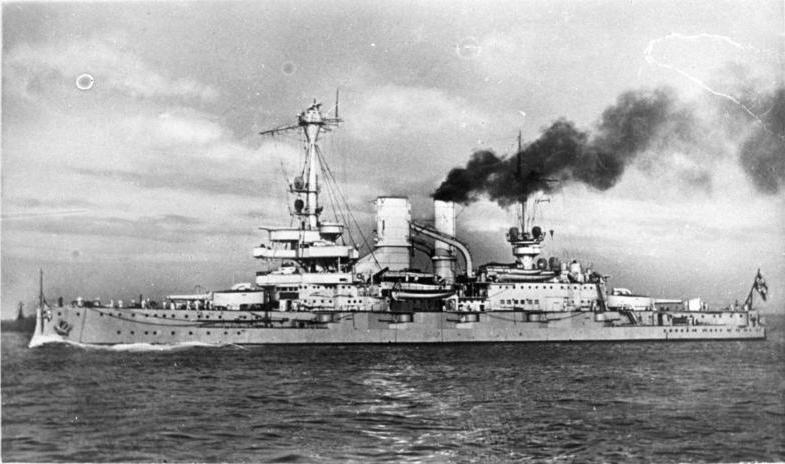
- Schleswig-Holstein in the late 1930s

History

German Empire
- Name: Schleswig-Holstein
- Namesake: Schleswig-Holstein
- Ordered: 11 June 1904
- Builder: Germaniawerft, Kiel
- Laid down: 18 August 1905
- Launched: 17 December 1906
- Commissioned: 6 July 1908
- Decommissioned: 2 May 1917

Germany
- Recommissioned: 31 January 1926
- Fate: Sunk by bombs, 1944; Scuttled, 21 March 1945; Raised and beached for use as target 1948; Remains still exist

General characteristics
- Class & type: Deutschland-class battleship
- Displacement: Normal: 13,191 t (12,983 long tons); Full load: 14,218 t (13,993 long tons)
- Length: 127.60 m (418 ft 8 in)
- Beam: 22.20 m (72 ft 10 in)
- Draft: 8.21 m (26 ft 11 in)
- Installed power: 16,767 ihp (12,503 kW); 12 × water-tube boilers
- Propulsion: 3 × triple-expansion steam engines; 3 × screw propellers
- Speed: 19.1 knots (35.4 km/h; 22.0 mph)
- Range: 5,720 nmi (10,590 km; 6,580 mi) at 10 knots (19 km/h; 12 mph)
- Complement: 35 officers; 708 enlisted men
- Armament: 4 × 28 cm (11 in) SK L/40 guns; 14 × 17 cm (6.7 in) SK L/40 guns; 20 × 8.8 cm (3.5 in) SK L/45 guns; 6 × 45 cm (17.7 in) torpedo tubes
- Armor: Belt: 240 mm (9.4 in); Turrets: 280 mm (11 in); Deck: 40 mm (1.6 in)

General characteristics 1926 refit
- Armament: 4 × 28 cm SK L/40 guns; 14 × 15 cm SK L/45 guns; 4 × 8.8 cm SK L/45 guns; 4 × 50 cm (19.7 in) torpedo tubes

General characteristics 1939 refit
- Crew: 31 officers; 565 enlisted men; 175 naval cadets
- Armament: 4 × 28 cm SK L/40 guns; 10 × 15 cm SK L/45 guns; 6 × 10.5 cm (4.1 in) anti-aircraft guns; 4 × 3.7 cm (1.5 in) guns; 4 × 2 cm (0.79 in) C/30 guns

SMS Schleswig-Holstein (Note: "SMS" stands for "Seiner Majestät Schiff", or "His Majesty's Ship" in German.) (pronounced [ˌʃleːsvɪç ˈhɔlʃtaɪn]) was the last of the five pre-dreadnought Deutschland-class battleships built by the German Kaiserliche Marine. The ship, named for the province of Schleswig-Holstein, was laid down in the Germaniawerft dockyard in Kiel in August 1905 and commissioned into the fleet nearly three years later. The ships of her class were already outdated by the time they entered service, being inferior in size, armor, firepower, and speed to the new generation of dreadnought battleships.

Schleswig-Holstein fought in both World Wars. During World War I, she saw front-line service in II Battle Squadron of the High Seas Fleet, culminating in the Battle of Jutland on 31 May – 1 June 1916. Schleswig-Holstein briefly engaged British forces during the battle, and was hit by one large-caliber shell. After the battle, Schleswig-Holstein was relegated to guard duty in the mouth of the Elbe River before being decommissioned in late 1917. As one of the few battleships permitted for Germany by the terms of the Treaty of Versailles, Schleswig-Holstein was again pressed into fleet service in the 1920s. In 1935, the old battleship was converted into a training ship for naval cadets.

Schleswig-Holstein fired the first shots of World War II when she bombarded the Polish base at Gdańsk's Westerplatte in the early morning hours of 1 September 1939. She was also employed during the German invasion of Denmark in April 1940. The ship was used as a training vessel for the majority of the war, and was sunk by British bombers in Gotenhafen in December 1944. Schleswig-Holstein was subsequently salvaged and then beached for use by the Soviet Navy as a target. As of 1990, the ship's bell was on display in the Bundeswehr Military History Museum in Dresden.

== Design ==
The passage of the Second Naval Law in 1900 under the direction of Vizeadmiral (VAdm—Vice Admiral) Alfred von Tirpitz secured funding for the construction of twenty new battleships over the next seventeen years. The first group, the five Braunschweig-class battleships, were laid down in the early 1900s, and shortly thereafter design work began on a follow-on design, which became the Deutschland class. The Deutschland-class ships were broadly similar to the Braunschweigs, featuring incremental improvements in armor protection. They also abandoned the gun turrets for the secondary battery guns, moving them back to traditional casemates to save weight. The British battleship HMS Dreadnought—armed with ten 12-inch (30.5 cm) guns—was commissioned in December 1906. Dreadnought's revolutionary design rendered every capital ship of the German navy obsolete, including the Deutschland class.

=== Characteristics ===
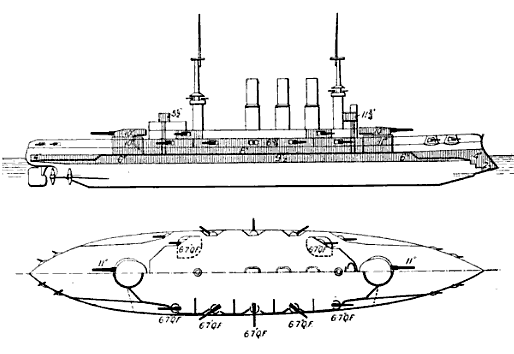
Plan and profile drawing of the Deutschland class as originally built

Schleswig-Holstein had a length of 127.60 m (418 ft 8 in), a beam of 22.20 m (72 ft 10 in), and a draft of 8.21 m (26 ft 11 in). She displaced 13,200 metric tons (13,000 long tons) normally and up to 14,218 metric tons (13,993 long tons) at combat loading. She had a flush deck and a pronounced ram bow. Her superstructure included a small, armored conning tower forward with an open bridge atop it, along with a smaller, secondary conning tower aft. The ship was equipped with two heavy military masts. She had a standard crew of 35 officers and 708 enlisted men.

The ship's propulsion system consisted of three triple-expansion steam engines that each drove a screw propeller. Steam was provided by twelve coal-fired water-tube boilers that were vented through three funnels. Her power-plant was rated to produce 16,767 indicated horsepower (12,503 kW) and a top speed of 19.1 knots (35.4 km/h; 22.0 mph). She had a fuel capacity of up to 1,540 metric tons (1,520 long tons; 1,700 short tons) of coal. In addition to being the second-fastest ship of her class, Schleswig-Holstein was the second-most fuel efficient. At a cruising speed of 10 knots (19 km/h; 12 mph), she could steam for 5,720 nautical miles (10,590 km; 6,580 mi).

The ship's primary armament consisted of four 28 cm SK L/40 guns in two twin turrets; (Note: In Imperial German Navy gun nomenclature, "SK" (Schnelladekanone) denotes that the gun is quick loading, while the L/40 denotes the length of the gun. In this case, the L/40 gun is 40 caliber, meaning that the gun is 40 times as long as its bore diameter.) one turret was placed forward and the other aft. Her offensive armament was rounded out with a secondary battery of fourteen 17 cm (6.7 in) SK L/40 guns mounted individually in casemates. A battery of twenty 8.8 cm (3.5 in) SK L/45 guns in single mounts provided defense against torpedo boats. These were distributed along the ship, including in sponsons in the bow and stern and in the superstructure. The ship was also armed with six 45 cm (17.7 in) torpedo tubes, all below the waterline. One was in the bow, one in the stern, and four on the broadside.

Schleswig-Holstein was protected with Krupp cemented armor. Her armor belt was 240 mm (9.4 in) thick amidships in the citadel, tapering to 100 mm (3.9 in) forward and aft, all backed with 80 Mm (49,709.7 mi) of teak planking. She had a curved armor deck that angled down at the sides to connect to the bottom of the belt armor. The deck was 40 mm (1.6 in) thick on the flat section and increased to 67–94 mm (2.6–3.7 in) on the sloped sides. The main battery turrets had 280 mm (11 in) thick sides, and her secondary casemates had 170 mm (6.7 in) of armor plate on their exposed sides. Her main conning tower received the heaviest protection, with sides that were 300 mm (11.8 in) thick.

=== Modifications ===
Schleswig-Holstein underwent a series of refits and modernizations throughout her career. At some point between 1912 and 1914, she had enclosed spotting tops added to both masts to aid in the direction of her main guns. In 1915, her boilers were fitted with supplementary oil sprayers, which sprayed fuel oil on the coal to increase its burn rate. After being withdrawn from service in 1917, the ship was almost entirely disarmed, keeping a battery of six 10.5 cm (4.1 in) L/45 guns in U-boat-type anti-aircraft mountings and four 8.8 cm SK L/45 guns.

A major reconstruction was carried out in 1925–1926 at the Reichsmarinewerft Wilhelmshaven in Wilhelmshaven. Her main battery was restored, and a new secondary battery was installed. The latter consisted of fourteen 15 cm (5.9 in) guns were installed. She retained the four 8.8 cm guns. The submerged torpedo tubes were removed and plated over, and four 50 cm (19.7 in) tubes in trainable deck launchers were installed in casemates, fore and aft. A heavy, tubular foremast with a larger spotting top was installed in place of the old military mast, and her forward superstructure was enlarged to house an admiral's staff.

Another, smaller refit was conducted between December 1927 and January 1928, which saw the ship's forward funnel trunked into the central funnel. In 1931, two of the 15 cm guns and all four of the 8.8 cm guns were removed.

A second major modernization was carried out from late 1935 to mid-1936 at what was now renamed the Kriegsmarinewerft in Wilhelmshaven. The changes included a new arrangement of anti-aircraft guns. Six heavy 10.5 cm (4.1 in) anti-aircraft guns were installed, along with four 3.7 mm (0.15 in) and four 2 cm (0.79 in) light weapons in a combination of individual and twin mounts. Two more of her 15 cm guns were removed, bringing the total of weapons to ten. The torpedo tubes were removed at this time, as were the old bow sponsons that had originally held some of the 8.8 cm guns. Two of her boilers were converted to oil-firing. Her crew was reduced to 31 officers and 565 enlisted men, along with 175 naval cadets.

During World War II, the ship had her anti-aircraft battery considerably strengthened, and by 1944, she carried ten 4 cm (1.6 in) Bofors guns and twenty-two 2 cm guns in a combination of twin and quadruple mounts.

== Service history ==
The contract for the new ship was placed on 11 June 1904. Schleswig-Holstein was laid down on 18 August 1905 at the Germaniawerft dockyard in Kiel, under the provisional name "Q". (Note: German warships were ordered under provisional names. Additions to the fleet were given a single letter; ships intended to replace older or lost vessels were ordered as "Ersatz (name of the ship to be replaced)".) She was launched on 17 December 1906, the last pre-dreadnought battleship of the German navy. At Schleswig-Holstein's launching ceremony, she was christened by Augusta Victoria of Schleswig-Holstein, the German Empress; Wilhelm II was also in attendance. Ernst Gunther, the Duke of Schleswig-Holstein, gave a speech at the launching ceremony. Upon completion, Schleswig-Holstein was commissioning for sea trials on 6 July 1908, under the command of Kapitän zur See (KzS—Captain at Sea) Franz von Holleben. Her crew largely came from her sister ship Schlesien. Upon completing her sea trials on 21 September the ship was assigned to II Battle Squadron of the High Seas Fleet, alongside her sister ships, and replacing the older battleship Kaiser Wilhelm der Grosse. In November, fleet and unit exercises were conducted in the Baltic Sea. During this period, the fleet also toured coastal German cities as part of an effort to increase public support for naval expenditures.

The training regimen in which Schleswig-Holstein participated followed a similar pattern over the next five years. Fleet maneuvers were conducted in the spring, followed by a summer cruise to Norway, and additional fleet training in the fall. For 1909, this included a cruise into the Atlantic, which was conducted from 7 July to 1 August. During the voyage, the fleet stopped in Bilbao, Spain. While on the way back to Germany, the High Seas Fleet was received by the British Royal Navy in Spithead. In late 1909, Admiral Henning von Holtzendorff became the fleet commander; his tenure as fleet commander was marked by strategic experimentation, owing to the increased threat the latest underwater weapons posed and the fact that the new Nassau-class battleships were too wide to pass through the Kaiser Wilhelm Canal. Accordingly, the fleet was transferred from Kiel to Wilhelmshaven on 1 April 1910.

In May 1910, the fleet conducted training maneuvers in the Kattegat. These were in accordance with Holtzendorff's strategy, which envisioned drawing the Royal Navy into the narrow waters there. The annual summer cruise was to Norway, and was followed by fleet training, during which another fleet review was held in Danzig on 29 August. Starting in September 1910, KzS Friedrich Boedicker took command of the ship, a position he held for the next three years. In March 1911, the fleet conducted exercises in the Skagerrak and Kattegat. Schleswig-Holstein and the rest of the fleet received British and American naval squadrons at Kiel in June and July. Due to the Agadir Crisis in July, the summer cruise only went into the Baltic to avoid exposing the fleet during the period of heightened tension with Britain and France. The year's autumn maneuvers were confined to the Baltic and the Kattegat. Another fleet review was held during the exercises for a visiting Austro-Hungarian delegation that included Archduke Franz Ferdinand and Admiral Rudolf Montecuccoli. Theobald von Bethmann Hollweg, the Chancellor of Germany, also attended the review. On 3 October, the ship was transferred back to II Squadron.

In 1913, she won the Kaiser's Schiesspreis (Gunnery Award) for excellent shooting among the ships of II Squadron. In October that year, KzS Hans Uthemann replaced Boedicker as the ship's commanding officer. The usual winter cruise in the Baltic followed at the end of the year. The next year's training proceeded in much the same pattern as in previous years, with no events of note. On 14 July 1914, the annual summer cruise to Norway began, but the threat of war in Europe cut the excursion short; within two weeks Schleswig-Holstein and the rest of II Squadron had returned to Wilhelmshaven. War between Austria-Hungary and Serbia broke out on the 28th, and in the span of a week all of the major European powers had joined the conflict.

=== World War I ===
At the outbreak of war in July 1914, Schleswig-Holstein was assigned to guard duty in the mouth of the Elbe River while the rest of the fleet mobilized. In late October, she and her sisters were sent to Kiel to have improvements made to their underwater protection system to make them more resistant to torpedoes and mines, after which II Battle Squadron rejoined the fleet. The squadron covered Konteradmiral (KAdm—Rear Admiral) Franz von Hipper's battlecruisers of the I Scouting Group while they bombarded Scarborough, Hartlepool, and Whitby on 15–16 December 1914. During the operation, the German battle fleet of some twelve dreadnoughts and eight pre-dreadnoughts came to within 10 nmi (19 km; 12 mi) of an isolated squadron of six British battleships. However, skirmishes between the rival destroyer screens convinced the German commander, Admiral Friedrich von Ingenohl, that he was confronted with the entire Grand Fleet, and so he broke off the engagement and turned the fleet for home.

Schleswig-Holstein then participated in a fleet advance to the Dogger Bank on 21–22 April 1915. On 11–12 September II Reconnaissance Group conducted a minelaying operation off the Swarte Bank with II Squadron in support. This was followed by another sweep by the fleet on 23–24 October that ended without result. In January 1916, Uthemann left the ship, his place being taken by KzS Eduard Varrentrapp. The following month, Schleswig-Holstein then served as a target ship for torpedo boat training. II and III Battle Squadron dreadnoughts conducted an advance into the North Sea on 5–7 March; Schleswig-Holstein and the rest of II Squadron remained in the German Bight, ready to sail in support. The ship received a pair of 8.8 cm guns in anti-aircraft mountings in April; these replaced two of the original low-angle 8.8 cm weapons. The ships of II Squadron then rejoined the fleet during the operation to bombard Yarmouth and Lowestoft on 24–25 April. During this operation, the battlecruiser Seydlitz was damaged by a British mine and had to return to port prematurely. Visibility was poor, so the operation was quickly called off before the British fleet could intervene.

==== Battle of Jutland ====
Diagram of the Battle of Jutland showing the major movements

The commander of the High Seas Fleet, Admiral Reinhard Scheer, immediately planned another advance into the North Sea, but the damage to Seydlitz delayed the operation until the end of May. As the last ship assigned to IV Division of II Battle Squadron, the rearmost German formation, Schleswig-Holstein was the last battleship in the line. II Battle Squadron was commanded by KAdm Franz Mauve. During the "Run to the North", Scheer ordered the fleet to pursue the retreating battleships of the British 5th Battle Squadron at top speed. Schleswig-Holstein and her sisters were significantly slower than the dreadnoughts and quickly fell behind. During this period, Scheer directed Hannover to place herself behind Schleswig-Holstein so he would have a flagship on either end of the formation. By 19:30, the Grand Fleet had arrived on the scene and confronted Scheer with significant numerical superiority. The German fleet was severely hampered by the presence of the slower Deutschland-class ships; if Scheer had ordered an immediate turn towards Germany, he would have had to sacrifice the slower ships to make his escape.

Scheer decided to reverse the course of the fleet with the Gefechtskehrtwendung, a maneuver that required every unit in the German line to turn 180° simultaneously. (Note: Gefechtskehrtwendung translates roughly as the "battle about-turn", and was a simultaneous 16-point turn of the entire High Seas Fleet. It had never been conducted under enemy fire before the Battle of Jutland.) Having fallen behind, the ships of II Battle Squadron could not conform to the new course following the turn, and fell to the disengaged side of the German line. Mauve considered moving his ships to the rear of the line, astern of III Battle Squadron dreadnoughts, but decided against it when he realized the movement would interfere with the maneuvering of Hipper's battlecruisers. Instead, he attempted to place his ships at the head of the line. But by the time II Squadron reached its position at the head of the line, Scheer had ordered another Gefechtskehrtwendung, which placed them at the rear of the German fleet. By 21:00, Scheer had turned the fleet around a third time, but the slow speed of Schleswig-Holstein and her squadron mates caused them to fall out of position, to the disengaged side of the fleet.

Later on the first day of the battle, Hipper's badly damaged battlecruisers were being engaged by their British rivals. Schleswig-Holstein and the other so-called "five-minute ships" came to their aid by steaming in between the opposing battlecruiser squadrons. (Note: The men of the German navy referred to pre-dreadnoughts as "five-minute ships" because that was the length of time they were expected to survive if confronted by a dreadnought.) These ships were very briefly engaged, owing in large part to the poor visibility. The visibility was so bad, the gunners aboard Schleswig-Holstein could not make out a target, and she did not fire her main guns. At 21:35 a heavy caliber shell struck the ship on the port-side, (Note: Sources disagree on the caliber of shell and the ship that fired it; John Campbell states that it was a 12-inch (30 cm) shell from HMS New Zealand, while V. E. Tarrant suggests it was a 13.5-inch (34 cm) shell, probably from HMS Princess Royal.) punching a hole approximately 40 cm (16 in) wide before exploding against the inner casemate armor. It tore apart 4.50 m (14.8 ft) of the superstructure deck and disabled one of the port side casemate guns. Three men were killed and nine were wounded. Mauve halted the fight against the much more powerful battlecruisers and ordered an 8-point turn to starboard.

Late on the 31st, the fleet re-formed for the night voyage back to Germany, with Schleswig-Holstein towards the rear of the line, ahead of Hessen, Hannover, and the battlecruisers Von der Tann and Derfflinger. Around 03:00, British destroyers conducted a series of attacks against the fleet, some of which were directed towards Schleswig-Holstein. Shortly thereafter, Pommern was struck by at least one torpedo from the destroyer Onslaught; the hit detonated an ammunition magazine, destroying the ship in a tremendous explosion. During the attack, Schleswig-Holstein was forced to turn away to avoid the destroyers' torpedoes. Shortly after 05:00, Hannover and several other ships fired repeatedly at what they falsely believed to be British submarines.

Despite the ferocity of the night fighting, the High Seas Fleet punched through the British destroyer forces and reached Horns Reef by 4:00 on 1 June. The German fleet reached Wilhelmshaven a few hours later, where the undamaged dreadnoughts of the Nassau and Helgoland classes took up defensive positions. Over the course of the battle, Schleswig-Holstein had fired only twenty 17 cm rounds.

==== Later actions ====
Schleswig-Holstein was put into dock for repairs 10–25 June 1916. The Navy then decided to withdraw the four remaining Deutschland-class ships from front-line use, owing to their obsolescence and vulnerability to underwater attacks, as demonstrated by the loss of Pommern. Thereafter, the ship was used as a target for U-boats, before resuming guard duties in the German Bight in July. On 1 December, II Squadron was formally detached from the High Seas Fleet. Schleswig-Holstein was also used to patrol the Danish Straits from 12 to 23 February 1917. Through late 1916 and early 1917, she also periodically served as a training target. In April Schleswig-Holstein was sent to Altenbruch at the mouth of the Elbe; here she was decommissioned on 2 May. Schleswig-Holstein was then disarmed and assigned to the 5th U-boat Flotilla to be used as a barracks ship in Bremerhaven. In 1918 the ship was moved to Kiel, where she remained for the rest of the war. Schleswig-Holstein was not among the list of ships to be interned at Scapa Flow following Germany's defeat in November 1918, and so she remained in Germany.

=== 1920s ===
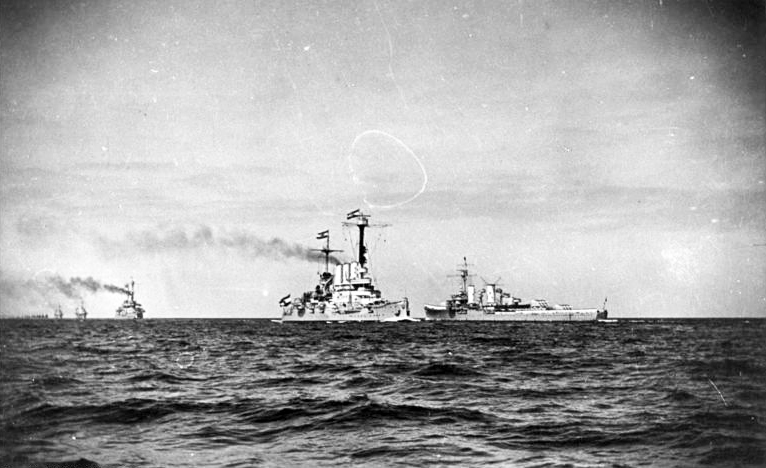
Battleships of the Reichsmarine on maneuvers in 1929 with a Königsberg-class cruiser on the right; the ship in the center is either Schleswig-Holstein or Hannover

Following the German defeat in World War I, the German navy was reorganized as the Reichsmarine according to the Treaty of Versailles. The new navy was permitted to retain eight pre-dreadnought battleships under Article 181—two of which would be in reserve—for coastal defense. Schleswig-Holstein was among the ships that were retained, along with her sisters Hannover and Schlesien and several of the Braunschweig-class battleships. Though she was the newest battleship retained by the Germans, Schleswig-Holstein was initially kept in reserve. After undergoing a major reconstruction in 1925–1926, the ship was recommissioned on 1 February 1926 to serve as the new flagship of the German fleet. Her crew came from the battleship Braunschweig, which she had replaced as flagship. VAdm Konrad Mommsen hoisted his flag aboard the ship at that time. KzS Gottfried Hansen served as the ship's captain.

Schleswig-Holstein and her sister Hannover went on a training cruise into the Atlantic that lasted from 14 May to 17 June 1926; while on the cruise, she visited Palma de Mallorca in the Mediterranean from 22 to 30 May. She stopped in Barcelona with Elsass from 1 to 7 June, and then proceeded to Vigo from 12 to 14 June, where she joined Hessen, Elsass, and Hannover. There, Mommsen met with King Alfonso XIII. As in the pre-war years, the fleet held its annual maneuvers in September, which took place off the Skagen. In October, KzS Wilhelm Rümann relieved Hansen as the ship's captain. Schleswig-Holstein went on another training cruise between 30 March and 14 June 1927 into the Atlantic. She visited a series of Iberian ports, including Lisbon, Portugal, where Mommsen was greeted by Óscar Carmona, the president of Portugal. During the 1927 fleet maneuvers, President Paul von Hindenburg observed the exercises aboard Schleswig-Holstein. Following their conclusion, KAdm Iwan Oldekop relieved the retiring Mommsen as fleet commander aboard the ship. Schleswig-Holstein received the alterations to her funnels during a shipyard period that lasted from December to January 1928.

For the 1928 training year, the annual summer cruise included stops in Denmark, Norway, and Iceland; the voyage lasted from 30 June to 18 July. During shooting practice on 8 August, Hindenburg, Admiral Hans Zenker, and General Wilhelm Groener boarded Schleswig-Holstein to observe the fleet's gunnery. The Spanish light cruiser Príncipe Alfonso visited Kiel, Germany, during the fleet maneuvers in September; the cruiser was carrying King Alfonso XIII on an official visit to Stockholm, Sweden. While in Kiel, Alfonso XIII came aboard Schleswig-Holstein. The Germans completed the maneuvers on 20 September, culminating in a fleet review held to mark Zenker's retirement as the Chef der Marineleitung (Head of the Naval Command). KzS Siegfried Maßmann arrived to take command of the ship in November. Schleswig-Holstein next saw service as an icebreaker in February 1929, in company with Elsass. The two battleships were used to clear paths in the Baltic sea ice, freeing 65 ships that had been caught in it, though during these operations, Schleswig-Holstein was accidentally struck by the freighter August Thyssen, incurring minor damage.

The fleet departed on another major overseas training cruise on 16 April that once again went to Spain. Schleswig-Holstein made stops in A Pobra do Caramiñal and Portugalete, Spain, before arriving back in Germany on 11 May. She next went abroad in August, this time in company with Hessen and several torpedo boats, for a visit to Stockholm. The Inspector General of the Argentine Army, who was visiting Germany at the time, came aboard Schleswig-Holstein during the September fleet maneuvers. While the fleet conducted tactical training in the Baltic in October, Schleswig-Holstein accidentally rammed the torpedo boat Leopard, inflicting serious damage, though there were no injuries. The latter vessel had to be towed back to port by the torpedo boat Luchs.

=== 1930s ===
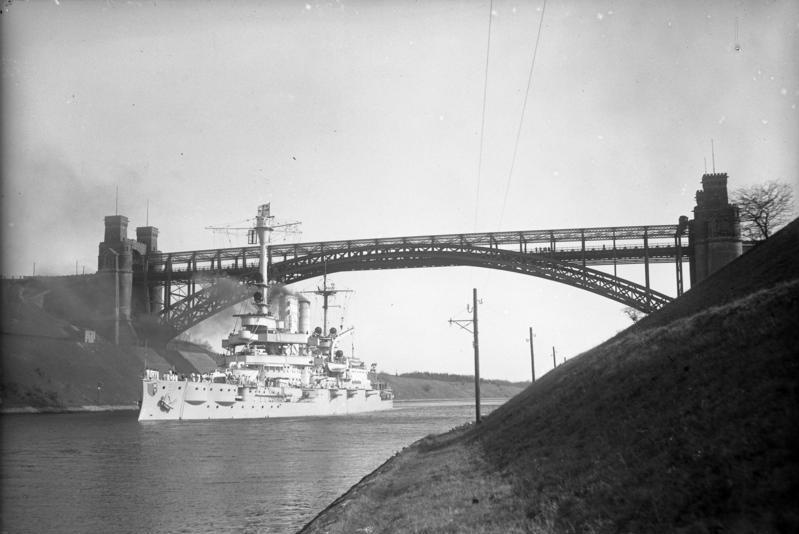
Schleswig-Holstein transiting the Kaiser Wilhelm Canal in 1932

The Reichsmarine carried out a series of reforms in early 1930, beginning with a reorganization of the fleet command on 1 January, though Schleswig-Holstein remained the flagship of what was now styled the Befehlshaber der Linienschiffe (Commander of Battleships). On 25 February, the fleet's home-port was relocated to Kiel, and that month, KzS Reinhold Knobloch took command of the ship. Schleswig-Holstein led the fleet on another major cruise that began on 2 April and lasted until 18 June. This time, the fleet sailed as far as the Mediterranean Sea, and stops included Vigo, Cádiz, Valencia, and Palma de Mallorca, Spain; Palermo, Catania, and Syracuse, Italy; Corfu and Piraeus, Greece. While in Catania, the Germans were welcomed by King Victor Emmanuel III. The fleet maneuvers in September passed without incident for Schleswig-Holstein. The year 1931 passed similarly uneventfully, tohugh the summer training cruise that year took the ship to Norway, and lasted only from 15 June to 3 July. Following the September maneuvers, Oldekop retired, and was replaced by VAdm Walter Gladisch, who continued to use Schleswig-Holstein as the fleet flagship. KzS Friedrich Götting replaced Knobloch as the ship's captain in October.

The ship took part in fleet maneuvers from 9 to 22 April 1932, followed by a short visit to Oslo, Norway in company with Hessen in July. The rest on the year passed under the normal peacetime routine, and the training year concluded with the September fleet exercises. Fleet training began in early 1933, and on 14 March, the ships received the revised ensign of the Reichsmarine. The fleet visited Norway and Sweden during its summer cruise in July and August that year. The autumn maneuvers, from 11 to 22 September, concluded with another fleet parade to mark another change in command; VAdm Richard Foerster now took command of the fleet, and KzS Karlgeorg Schuster became Schleswig-Holstein's captain. The 1934 summer cruise, in July, went to Norway and included visits to Oslo and Ulvik. Schleswig-Holstein sailed to Amsterdam, Netherlands, from 18 to 22 October. In February 1935, KzS Conrad Patzig relieved Schuster as the ship's commander. The German government instituted major reforms of the military in May 1935, which included renaming the Reichsmarine as the Kriegsmarine (War Navy). In August, Adolf Hitler, Hermann Göring, General Werner von Blomberg, and Admiral Erich Raeder came aboard Schleswig-Holstein to observe shooting practice. On 22 September, Foerster hauled down his flag so that the ship could be decommissioned and converted into a training ship. The following month, KzS Günther Krause took command of the ship.

On 1 August 1936, Schleswig-Holstein was formally transferred from the fleet command to the Inspektion des Bildungswesens der Marine (Naval Training Inspectorate). The ship embarked on her first major training cruise on 12 October. The voyage lasted until 21 April 1937, and took the ship to tour the eastern coast of Central and South America. Following the ship's return to Germany, KzS Hans Feldbausch replaced Krause as the captain. Schleswig-Holstein's next overseas cruise began on 11 October and sailed around Africa, concluding on 20 April 1938. In June, KzS Gustav Kieseritzky took command of the ship. Her third and final pre-war cruise lasted from 29 October 1938 to 10 March 1939. This returned to Central and South American waters. KzS Gustav Kleikamp replaced Kieseritzky in April. It was intended to decommission Schleswig-Holstein again in late 1939 so she could be converted into a radio-controlled target ship, but this did not come to fruition due to Germany's increasingly aggressive foreign policy. After coming to power in 1933, Hitler had sought to reassert Germany's power in Europe; in 1936 he re-militarized the Rhineland, and in 1938 completed the Anschluss of Austria and the annexation of the Sudetenland. He then demanded German control over the city of Danzig, which had become a free city after World War I.

=== 1939–1940 ===
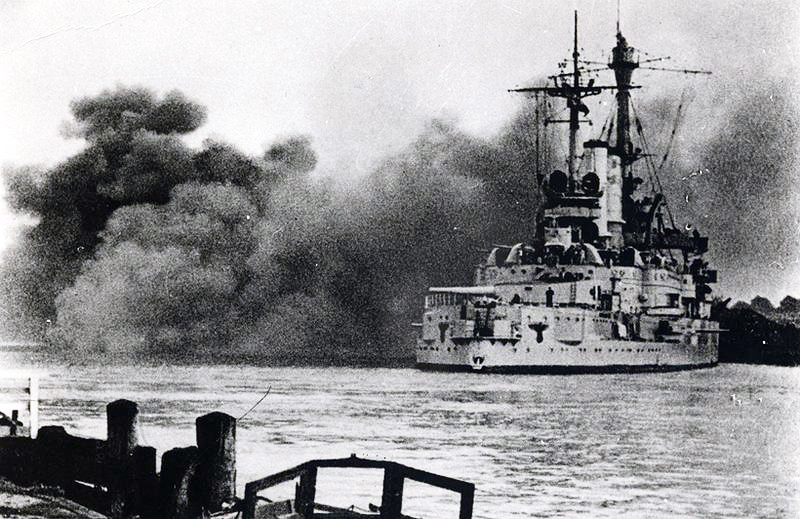
Schleswig-Holstein shelling Polish positions in Westerplatte, September 1939

In August 1939, Schleswig-Holstein embarked a detachment of sixty soldiers, along with five 2 cm anti-aircraft guns and six machine guns, and then sailed to Danzig. While on the way on 24 August, another 225-strong detachment from the 11th Naval Artillery Battalion were transferred to the ship; these men brought additional heavy weapons, including mortars and more machine guns. Upon arrival in Danzig, the ship moored alongside the fortified ammunition depot at Westerplatte. Ostensibly in the port on a ceremonial visit, Schleswig-Holstein opened fire at around 04:47 on 1 September, firing the first shots of the German invasion of Poland. The soldiers stormed ashore to attack the Polish positions at Westerplatte, but heavier-than-expected resistance from the defenders in the ensuing Battle of Westerplatte defeated the initial assault. The Germans launched a second attack later in the morning; despite heavy gunfire from Schleswig-Holstein, the Poles again held onto their positions.

The torpedo boats T196 and Von der Gröben were sent to reinforce Schleswig-Holstein on 4 September, and a renewed assault was carried out by a combined force of infantry and army engineers. Air attacks by Junkers Ju 87 Stuka dive-bombers destroyed the base's water supply, and combined with heavy fire from Schleswig-Holstein in bombardments on 4 and 7 September, the Polish garrison was forced to surrender at 10:30 on the 7th. Schleswig-Holstein then moved to bombard Polish positions and coastal artillery batteries at Hel and Redłowo for the next several days, concluding on 13 September. On 19 September, KAd, Hubert Schmundt—the commander of German naval forces in the area—made Schleswig-Holstein his flagship, a role she held until 11 October. During this period, from 25 to 27 September, Schleswig-Holstein returned to Hel with her sister Schlesien; both vessels conducted further bombardments of Polish positions there. On 25 September, Polish artillery batteries there lightly damaged Schleswig-Holstein.

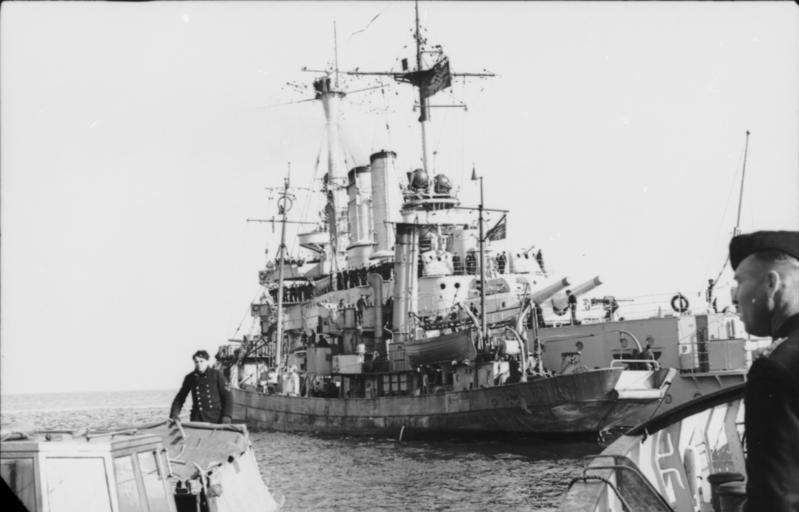
Schleswig-Holstein off the coast of Denmark during Operation Weserübung, 9 April 1940

In the aftermath of the defeat of Poland later that month, Schleswig-Holstein returned to training duties in the Baltic. At some point that year, her 15 cm guns were removed to arm the commerce raiders Widder and Orion. Training lasted until April 1940, when the ship was assigned to Operation Weserübung (Weser Exercise), the invasion of Denmark and Norway. The ship served as the centerpiece of Group 7, along with the torpedo boat Claus von Bevern and several minor warships and a pair of transport ships. Under Kleikamp's overall command, Group 7 was part of the invasion of Denmark, and they were intended to land at Nyborg and Korsør. Early on 9 April, the Germans carried out their landings at the two cities without bloodshed, though Schleswig-Holstein briefly ran aground on the Vengeancegrunden shoal. A shortage of naval crews led the Germans to decommission Schleswig-Holstein on 28 August 1940. At that time, Kleikamp left the ship. She was laid up at Gotenhafen in occupied Poland, and her remaining crew were transferred to Schlesien. While in Gotenhafen, her 2 cm guns were removed for use elsewhere. The ship was then moved to Kiel between 3 and 5 November for an overhaul that lasted until 15 December.

=== 1941–1945 ===
Schleswig-Holstein was next recommissioned on 20 January 1941 with a partial crew, initially to serve as an icebreaker in the Baltic along with Schlesien; this lasted until late March. She then returned to Gotenhafen, where she was used as a stationary training ship while the rest of her crew was assembled. She was ready for active use by June, and she was allocated to the naval forces that were assembled in the Baltic to prevent an expected attempt by the Soviet Baltic Fleet when Germany invaded the Soviet Union that month. Schleswig-Holstein and Schlesien, decidedly second-line units, were stationed behind minefields with the 6th E-boat Flotilla. No Soviet forces materialized, and the ships were withdrawn in October. Schleswig-Holstein thereafter resumed training duties, for a time serving as the flagship of the Chief of Training Units. Her crew was reduced and she was again based at Gotenhafen. In early 1942, she returned to icebreaker duties in the Baltic, and during this period she accidentally collided with a wreck in the Gulf of Riga. She had to return to Wilhelmshaven for repairs in May. At that time, KzS Walter Hennecke took command of the ship, though he remained aboard just until October. Schleswig-Holstein remained in service through March 1943; she was thereafter used as a barracks ship and stationary training hulk.

The navy recommissioned Schleswig-Holstein on 1 February 1944, once again for training purposes; one of the benefits of reactivating the old battleship was that she still possessed four coal-fired boilers, as fuel oil had become a critical commodity for Nazi Germany by 1944. Her first training cruise departed Gotenhafen and sailed to Bornholm and then to Swinemünde. As the German military situation continued to worsen through 1944, the navy made alterations to the ship, centered on improving her anti-aircraft firepower, though her main battery guns were also replaced. These updates were intended to allow her to be used as a convoy escort between Germany and Courland, where considerable German forces were trapped. While the refit was being carried out in Gotenhafen, British Royal Air Force bombers struck the port on 18 December, and Schleswig-Holstein received three direct kits and several near misses, killing 28 of her crew. The ship settled to the bottom of the harbor, lying on an even keel in about 12 m (39 ft) of water.

Schleswig-Holstein sunk in Gdynia, c. 1945

The Germans brought three vessels with pumps in an unsuccessful attempt to refloat Schleswig-Holstein. Two days after the sinking, a fire broke out aboard the ship that blazed for some twelve hours before it was extinguished; the fire badly damaged most of what was still above the waterline. The remaining crew abandoned the wreck and she was formally decommissioned on 25 January 1945. Some of the men were sent to reinforce the defenses of Marienburg, where they were annihilated by the Soviet army. Remaining crewmen detonated explosives aboard the wreck on 21 March to prevent it from being refloated as the Soviets approached Gotenhafen, which fell to the Soviet offensive a week later.

=== Postwar fate ===
In the postwar settlement, Schleswig-Holstein was designated as a warship in Category C, which must be sunk or dismantled by 15 February 1946. Poland was allocated responsibility for destroying a number of wrecked vessels in its territory, including Schleswig-Holstein. The Soviet Navy sealed and refloated the wreck on 29 August 1945, initially taking her to Tallinn on 22 May 1946. A report issued by a Polish newspaper in July 1946 indicated that the Soviets would instead take control of the ship, with the intention of restoring her into a training vessel. The newly recreated Polish Navy denied the report, however, preferring to keep the wreck for its own purposes, in part for the symbolic value of retaining the ship that had fired the first shots of the war. The Soviets had already added the ship to its naval register in March 1946, and was indeed planning on reconditioning it for training purposes. The plan proved to be unworkable, however, and on 26 June 1947, the hulk was beached off the island of Osmussaar in the Gulf of Finland, where she was used as a stationary target. This lasted until about 1966, by which time the shattered wreck was no longer visible above the water. Her bell was held in the collection of the Military History Museum of the Bundeswehr in Dresden as of 1990.
