= Thorsten Guttormsen Fretheim =

Norwegian politician

Thorstein Guttormsen Fretheim (25 January 1808 – 30 May 1874) was a Norwegian politician.

He was elected to the Norwegian Parliament in 1842, 1848, 1860, 1863, 1871, 1872, and 1873, representing the rural constituency of Nordre Bergenhus Amt (today named Sogn og Fjordane). He worked as a farmer.
