= Erwin Clausen =

German fighter ace and Knight's Cross recipient

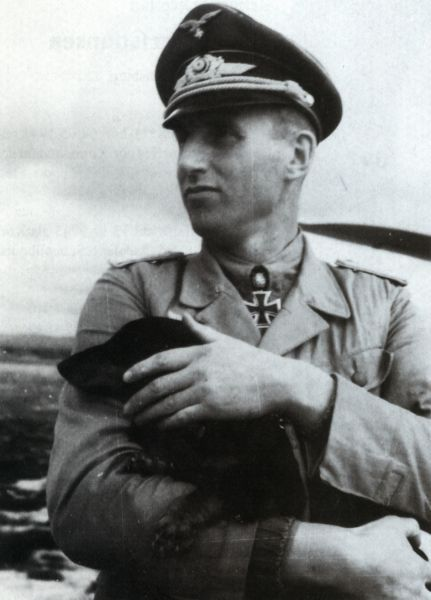
- Born: 5 August 1911; Steglitz, Kingdom of Prussia, German Empire
- Died: 4 October 1943 (aged 32); North Sea, off Borkum, Free State of Prussia, Nazi Germany
- Military career
- Allegiance: Weimar Republic (to 1933); Nazi Germany
- Branch: Reichsmarine; Luftwaffe
- Service years: 1931–1943
- Rank: Major (major)
- Nickname: Caesar
- Units: Hessen; Gorch Fock; LG 2, JG 77, EJGr Süd, JG 11
- Commands: 6./JG 77, I./JG 11
- Conflicts: See battles World War II: Invasion of Poland; Battle of France; Balkan Campaign; Eastern Front; Operation Barbarossa; Defense of the Reich †
- Awards: Knight's Cross of the Iron Cross with Oak Leaves

Erwin Clausen (5 August 1911 – 4 October 1943) was a German Luftwaffe military aviator during World War II, a fighter ace credited with 132 aerial victories—that is, 132 aerial combat encounters resulting in the destruction of the enemy aircraft—claimed in 561 combat missions. He was "ace-in-a-day" four times, shooting down five or more aircraft on a single day.

Born in Berlin-Steglitz, Clausen volunteered for military service with the Reichsmarine in 1931. He transferred to the Luftwaffe of Nazi Germany in 1935. Following flight training, he was posted to Lehrgeschwader 2 (LG 2—2nd Demonstration Wing). He flew his first combat missions in the invasion of Poland, claiming his first aerial victory on 9 September 1939. Clausen then fought in the Battle of France, Battle of Britain, invasion of Yugoslavia and Operation Barbarossa, the German invasion of the Soviet Union. In June 1942, he was appointed Staffelkapitän (squadron leader) of 6. Staffel (6th squadron) of Jagdgeschwader 77 (JG 77—77th Fighter Wing). One month later, he was awarded the Knight's Cross of the Iron Cross followed by the Knight's Cross of the Iron Cross with Oak Leaves on 23 July 1942 after 101 victories.

In June 1943, Clausen was appointed Gruppenkommandeur (group commander) of I. Gruppe of Jagdgeschwader 11 (JG 11—11th Fighter Wing), tasked with defense of the Reich missions. He was posted as missing in action after aerial combat over the North Sea on 4 October 1943. He was promoted to Major (major) posthumously.

== Early life and career ==
Clausen was born on 5 August 1911 in Berlin-Steglitz, the son of a master craftsman (Meister) joiner. Before joining military service, he worked in his father's company. He joined the Reichsmarine, the German Navy during the Weimar Republic, in 1931. During his service with the Reichsmarine, he went on cruises on board of Hessen and the school ship Gorch Fock. In 1935, Clausen transferred to the newly emerging Luftwaffe of the Nazi Germany. Holding the rank of Unteroffizier (subordinate officer or lance sergeant), he received flight training. (Note: Flight training in the Luftwaffe progressed through the levels A1, A2 and B1, B2, referred to as A/B flight training. A training included theoretical and practical training in aerobatics, navigation, long-distance flights and dead-stick landings. The B courses included high-altitude flights, instrument flights, night landings and training to handle the aircraft in difficult situations. For pilots destined to fly multi-engine aircraft, the training was completed with the Luftwaffe Advanced Pilot's Certificate (Erweiterter Luftwaffen-Flugzeugführerschein), also known as the C-Certificate.)

== World War II ==
World War II in Europe had begun on Friday, 1 September 1939, when German forces invaded Poland. Clausen, now a Feldwebel (sergeant), had been assigned to the 3.(Jagd)/ LG 2, the 3. Staffel (3rd squadron) of Lehrgeschwader 2 (LG 2—2nd Demonstration Wing) before the outbreak of hostilities. (Note: For an explanation of the meaning of Luftwaffe unit designation see Organization of the Luftwaffe during World War II.) This squadron was subordinated to I.(Jagd) Gruppe (1st group) of LG 2. On 9 September 1939, I.(Jagd) Gruppe was ordered to relocate to an airfield at Lauenburg west of Bydgoszcz. On the afternoon (16:06 – 17:10) of that day, the Gruppe flew a combat air patrol mission, and for the first time of the war 3. Staffel had enemy contact. In this encounter, Clausen claimed his first aerial victory when he shot down a PWS-26 biplane trainer. This was certainly a misidentified PZL P.11 fighter. According to Łydżba, Polish III/3 Squadron, which took part in this combat, had only two P.11c damaged after 16:50, while five German pilots claimed aerial victories. On 17 September, he received the Iron Cross 2nd Class (Eisernes Kreuz 2. Klasse). Following the Battle of the Bzura on 20 September, I.(Jagd) Gruppe was ordered to relocate to Graz-Thalerhof.

=== Battle of France and Britain ===
On 30 September, the Gruppe moved to an airfield at Uetersen, flying defensive missions over the German Bight. The unit relocated multiple times and was flying in defense of the Reich from Esbjerg on 10 May 1940, the start of the Battle of France. On 14 May, I.(Jagd) Gruppe transferred to Essen-Mülheim for operations against France. On 23 May, they transferred again, this time to Ferme Montecouvez, an airfield approximately 15 kilometers (9.3 mi) south of Cambrai. Two days later, I.(Jagd) Gruppe was tasked with providing fighter escort for German transports resupplying the 4th Army in the vicinity of Cambrai. On this mission, Clausen claimed an Armée de l'air Potez 63 twin-engined aircraft shot down. In this encounter, his Messerschmitt Bf 109 E was also damaged, resulting in a forced landing near Cambrai. On 15 June, I.(Jagd) Gruppe was moved to Saint-Omer, the armistice was signed on 22 June, ending the Battle of France on 25 June. The unit was given three days of rest, some of the pilots were sent on home leave. On 30 June, I.(Jagd) Gruppe was scrambled to intercept a flight of Royal Air Force Bristol Blenheim bombers resulting in combat southwest of Saint-Omer. In this encounter, Clausen claimed a Blenheim from No. 110 Squadron shot down which was not confirmed but was himself shot down in his Bf 109 E. Clausen was awarded the Iron Cross 1st Class (Eisernes Kreuz 1. Klasse) on 4 July 1940 and was promoted to Oberleutnant (first lieutenant) on 1 February 1941. That day, Clausen was also appointed Staffelkapitän (squadron leader) of 1.(Jagd) Staffel of LG 2, this squadron became the 1. Staffel of Jagdgeschwader 77 (JG 77—77th Fighter Wing) on 6 January 1942.

Leading this squadron, Clausen participated in the Balkan Campaign. On 6 April 1941, he recorded three victories during the invasion of Yugoslavia, these were Hawker Fury fighters of the Yugoslav Royal Air Force's 36th Fighter Group shot down over Režanovačka Kosa airfield near Kumanovo. This resulted in the presentation of the Honour Goblet of the Luftwaffe (Ehrenpokal der Luftwaffe) on 20 June 1941.

=== Eastern Front ===
Following the Balkan Campaign, I.(Jagd)/LG 2 was again subordinated to JG 77 on 18 June 1941 and was moved to Bucharest, Romania in preparation for Operation Barbarossa, the German invasion of the Soviet Union on 22 June 1941. JG 77 supported the German advance as part of Heeresgruppe Süd (Army Group South). On 21 June, the Gruppe was ordered to Roman, a forward airfield near the Siret river. Clausen claimed his first aerial victory on the Eastern Front, his seventh overall, on 2 July 1941. The mission, the second of the day, a combat air patrol encountered a flight of a Polikarpov I-153 biplane fighters east of Iași. Later that afternoon, on the fourth mission of the day, he claimed another I-153 shot down.

On 3 and 4 February 1942, Clausen and Oberleutnant Friedrich Geißhardt shot down three Polikarpov R-5s or Polikarpov R-Zs of 622 LBAP (Legkii Bombardirovochnyy Aviatsionyy Polk—Light Bomber Aviation Regiment) and 672 LBAP. Clausen became an "ace-in-a-day" for the first time on 9 March 1942, claiming aerial victories 36 to 40. Following the Battle of the Kerch Peninsula, his total had reached 52 aerial victories on 6 April 1942. For this, he was awarded the German Cross in Gold (Deutsches Kreuz in Gold) on 18 May 1942, a direct presentation by Reichsmarschall Hermann Göring. Four days later, he was also honored with the Knight's Cross of the Iron Cross (Ritterkreuz des Eisernen Kreuzes).

On 27 June 1942, Clausen was transferred to 6. Staffel of JG 77 and appointed its Staffelkapitän. On 14 July during the landing approach at the airfield at Kastornoye, Clausen was injured when his Bf 109 F-4 (Werknummer 13121—factory number) collided with aircraft from 4. Staffel which were taking off. On 21 July, he claimed four victories, three Petlyakov Pe-2 bombers and one LaGG-3. He reached his 100th victory after he claimed six further victories the next day. Shooting down a LaGG-3, a Hurricane and three Il-2s, took his tally to 101 aerial victories. Clausen was the 12th Luftwaffe pilot to achieve the century mark. For this achievement, he was awarded the Knight's Cross of the Iron Cross with Oak Leaves (Ritterkreuz des Eisernen Kreuzes mit Eichenlaub) on 23 July 1943. He was the 106th member of the German armed forces to be so honored. Clausen and together with Oberleutnant Viktor Bauer were presented the Oak Leaves by Adolf Hitler at the Führerhauptquartier at Rastenburg.

On 5 December, II. Gruppe of JG 77 was transferred to the North African theater, arriving at an airfield near Janzur, located west of Tripoli. Clausen initially stayed in Europe because he had become ill with Malaria. During his absence, Leutnant Johann Badum temporarily assumed command of 6. Staffel.

=== Defense of the Reich and death ===
Clausen, who for his facial features was nicknamed 'Caesar', was transferred to the Ergänzungs-Jagdgruppe Süd (Supplementary Fighter Group, South) on 1 February 1943, and promoted to Hauptmann (captain). On 20 June 1943, Clausen was appointed Gruppenkommandeur (group commander) of I. Gruppe of Jagdgeschwader 11 (JG 11—11th Fighter Wing), succeeding Major Walter Spies. This Gruppe was based in Husum and flew in defense of the Reich against the United States Army Air Forces (USAAF) Eighth Air Force. On 17 July 1943, 332 heavy bombers of the 1st and 4th Bombardment Wing planned on targeting Hanover and Hamburg. The plan had to be abandoned due to changing weather conditions. Elements of 4th Bombardment Wing were already airborne and aimed at targeting the Fokker aircraft manufacturing sites at Amsterdam. In defense of this attack, Clausen claimed his 121st aerial victory, a Boeing B-17 Flying Fortress shot down at 09:42.

On 4 October 1943, the USAAF targeted and bombed Frankfurt am Main. Clausen shot down a B-24 Liberator, his 12th over the USAAF, but then was killed in aerial combat over the North Sea in his Focke-Wulf Fw 190 A-5/U12 (Werknummer 7358—factory number) approximately 115 kilometers (71 mi) northwest of Borkum. The exact circumstances of his death remain unknown, he made his last radio communication at 10:28, confirming the order to return to base. At the time, his wife and three children had been living with him at the Husum airbase. Clausen was posthumously promoted to Major (major), the promotion backdated to 1 October 1943. (Note: According to Stockert, a Luftwaffe document (Rangliste der deutschen Luftwaffe) dated 20 April 1944 lists him holding the rank Hauptmann.) Three of his brothers were also killed in action during World War II.

== Summary of career ==
=== Aerial victory claims ===
According to US historian David T. Zabecki, Clausen was credited with 132 aerial victories. Spick also lists him with 132 aerial victories claimed in 561 combat missions and a mission-to-claim ratio of 4.25. He claimed one victory over Poland, three over Yugoslavia, 17 victories over the Western Front, including 14 four-engined bombers, with the remaining victories achieved over the Eastern Front. Mathews and Foreman, authors of Luftwaffe Aces — Biographies and Victory Claims, researched the German Federal Archives and found documentation for 100 aerial victory claims, plus one further unconfirmed claim. This number includes 1 claim over Poland, 3 over Yugoslavia, 16 on the Western Front, including 10 four-engined bombers, and 84 on the Eastern Front.

Victory claims were logged to a map-reference (PQ = Planquadrat), for example "PQ 75234". The Luftwaffe grid map (Jägermeldenetz) covered all of Europe, western Russia and North Africa and was composed of rectangles measuring 15 minutes of latitude by 30 minutes of longitude, an area of about 360 square miles (930 km^{2}). These sectors were then subdivided into 36 smaller units to give a location area 3 km × 4 km (1.9 mi × 2.5 mi) in size.

Chronicle of aerial victories
This and the ♠ (Ace of spades) indicates those aerial victories which made Clausen an "ace-in-a-day", a term which designates a fighter pilot who has shot down five or more airplanes in a single day. This and the – (dash) indicates unconfirmed aerial victory claims for which Clausen did not receive credit. This and the ! (exclamation mark) indicates those aerial victories listed by Prien and Rodeike. This and the # (hash mark) indicates those aerial victories listed by Mathews and Foreman.
Claim!	Claim#	Date	Time	Type	Location	Unit	Claim!	Claim#	Date	Time	Type	Location	Unit
– Claims with Jagdgeschwader 77 in Poland – September 1939
1	1	9 September 1939	17:03	PWS-26 (Note: According to Mathews and Foreman a PZL P.24.)	Area of Bromberg	3.(J)/LG 2 (Note: According to Mathews and Foreman with 1.(J)/LG 2.)							
– Claims with Jagdgeschwader 77 during the Battle of France – 10 May – 25 June 1940
2		25 May 1940	—	Potez-63		3.(J)/LG 2		2	10 June 1940	12:43	Blenheim		1.(J)/LG 2
	—	29 May 1940	18:10	Hurricane	Dunkirk	1.(J)/LG 2							
– Claims with Jagdgeschwader 77 against England – June – November 1940
—		30 June 1940	—	Blenheim		3.(J)/LG 2	3	3	23 September 1940	10:45	Spitfire		3.(J)/LG 2
– Claims with Jagdgeschwader 77 during the Balkan Campaign – April 1941
4	4	6 April 1941	06:20	Fury	Režanovačka Kosa	1.(J)/LG 2	6	6	6 April 1941	09:41	Fury	Režanovačka Kosa	1.(J)/LG 2
5	5	6 April 1941	06:27	Fury	Režanovačka Kosa	1.(J)/LG 2							
– Claims with Jagdgeschwader 77 on the Eastern Front – Operation Barbarossa — June – December 1941
	7	28 June 1941	14:10	I-16		1.(J)/LG 2	13		28 August 1941	—	MBR-2		1.(J)/LG 2
7	8	2 July 1941	12:35	I-153		1.(J)/LG 2	14		28 August 1941	—	MBR-2		1.(J)/LG 2
8		2 July 1941	—	I-153		1.(J)/LG 2	15	10	29 August 1941	15:30	MBR-2	25 km (16 mi) east of Sfântu Gheorghe	1.(J)/LG 2
9	9	4 July 1941	17:15	I-15		1.(J)/LG 2	16	11	29 August 1941	15:30	MBR-2	25 km (16 mi) east of Sfântu Gheorghe	1.(J)/LG 2
10		11 July 1941	—	I-16		1.(J)/LG 2		12	29 August 1941	15:35	SB-3		1.(J)/LG 2
11		3 August 1941	—	SB-2		1.(J)/LG 2		13	29 August 1941	15:40	SB-3		1.(J)/LG 2
12		17 August 1941	—	I-16		1.(J)/LG 2							
– Claims with Jagdgeschwader 77 on the Eastern Front – Winter War — December 1941 – April 1942
17		22 December 1941	—	I-61		1.(J)/LG 2		16	4 March 1942	14:20	Yak-7	north of Slavyansk-na-Kubani	1./JG 77
18		29 December 1941	—	I-15		1.(J)/LG 2	35		4 March 1942	—	I-18		1./JG 77
19		16 January 1942	—	I-16		1./JG 77	36♠	17	9 March 1942	10:02	R-5		1./JG 77
20		16 January 1942	—	MiG-3		1./JG 77	37♠	18	9 March 1942	10:04	R-5		1./JG 77
21		23 January 1942	—	I-16		1./JG 77	38♠	19	9 March 1942	10:18	R-5		1./JG 77
22		4 February 1942	—	R-10		1./JG 77	39♠	20	9 March 1942	16:35	R-5 (Note: According to Mathews and Foreman claimed as a LaGG-3.)		1./JG 77
23		4 February 1942	—	R-5		1./JG 77	40♠	21	9 March 1942	—	I-18 (Note: According to Mathews and Foreman claimed as a R-5.)		1./JG 77
24		16 February 1942	—	MiG-3		1./JG 77	41	22	15 March 1942	15:40	I-18 (Note: According to Mathews and Foreman claimed as a Yak-7.)		1./JG 77
25		16 February 1942	—	I-16		1./JG 77	42		15 March 1942	—	I-18		1./JG 77
26		18 February 1942	—	SB-3		1./JG 77	43		17 March 1942	—	I-16		1./JG 77
27		21 February 1942	—	I-16		1./JG 77	44	23	21 March 1942	16:30	I-61 (Note: According to Mathews and Foreman claimed as a MiG-3.)		1./JG 77
28		22 February 1942	—	I-16		1./JG 77	45	24	22 March 1942	16:00	I-61		1./JG 77
29		23 February 1942	—	I-26		1./JG 77	46		22 March 1942	—	I-16		1./JG 77
30		24 February 1942	—	I-16		1./JG 77	47		22 March 1942	—	I-16		1./JG 77
31		28 February 1942	—	I-16		1./JG 77	48		27 March 1942	—	unknown		1./JG 77
32		28 February 1942	—	I-16		1./JG 77	49		28 March 1942	—	I-16		1./JG 77
33	14	2 March 1942	10:25	R-10 (Note: According to Mathews and Foreman claimed as a Seversky.)	north of Slavyansk-na-Kubani	1./JG 77	50		28 March 1942	—	I-16		1./JG 77
34		4 March 1942	—	I-18		1./JG 77	51		30 March 1942	—	I-61		1./JG 77
	15	4 March 1942	13:45	Yak-7	west of Slavyansk-na-Kubani	1./JG 77	52		6 April 1942	—	I-61		1./JG 77
– Claims with Jagdgeschwader 77 on the Eastern Front – Kerch, Sevastopol, Izium — May/June 1942
53		30 May 1942	—	I-16	east of Kerch	1./JG 77	56	26	13 June 1942	05:45	Yak-3	Kerch Strait	1./JG 77
54		31 May 1942	—	LaGG-3	PQ 75234, Krymskaja	1./JG 77	57	27	14 June 1942	07:20	I-16	Kerch Strait	1./JG 77
55	25	10 June 1942	08:25	Il-2	Sevastopol	1./JG 77							
– Claims with Jagdgeschwader 77 on the Eastern Front – Summer Offensive — 28 June – 7 November 1942
58	28	2 July 1942	10:25	LaGG-3		6./JG 77	90♠	60	13 July 1942	09:55	Il-2		6./JG 77
59	29	5 July 1942	11:45	LaGG-3		6./JG 77	91	61	14 July 1942	06:50	LaGG-3		6./JG 77
60	30	5 July 1942	11:52	MiG-3		6./JG 77	92	62	21 July 1942	06:45	Pe-2		6./JG 77
61	31	5 July 1942	11:56	I-180		6./JG 77	93	63	21 July 1942	06:46	Pe-2		6./JG 77
62	32	5 July 1942	13:51	Pe-2	Novorossiysk region	6./JG 77	94	64	21 July 1942	06:50	Pe-2		6./JG 77
63	33	6 July 1942	03:32	LaGG-3		6./JG 77	95	65	21 July 1942	06:52	LaGG-3		6./JG 77
64	34	6 July 1942	03:40	LaGG-3		6./JG 77	96♠	66	22 July 1942	14:30	LaGG-3		6./JG 77
65	35	6 July 1942	03:50	LaGG-3		6./JG 77	97♠	67	22 July 1942	14:35	Hurricane		6./JG 77
66	36	7 July 1942	19:35	LaGG-3		6./JG 77	98♠	68	22 July 1942	14:41	MiG-3		6./JG 77
67	37	7 July 1942	19:50	LaGG-3		6./JG 77	99♠	69	22 July 1942	18:30	Il-2		6./JG 77
68	38	8 July 1942	16:30	Pe-2		6./JG 77	100♠	70	22 July 1942	18:33	Il-2		6./JG 77
69	39	8 July 1942	16:35	Il-2		6./JG 77	101♠	71	22 July 1942	18:36	Il-2		6./JG 77
70	40	8 July 1942	19:35	LaGG-3		6./JG 77	102	72	26 July 1942	03:45	I-180		6./JG 77
71	41	9 July 1942	08:15	LaGG-3		6./JG 77	103	73	5 September 1942	17:15	LaGG-3 (Note: According to Mathews and Foreman claimed as an Il-2.)	65 km (40 mi) northwest of Voronezh	6./JG 77
72	42	9 July 1942	08:20	LaGG-3		6./JG 77	104	74	5 September 1942	17:20	LaGG-3	65 km (40 mi) south-southwest of Yelets	6./JG 77
73	43	9 July 1942	12:17	LaGG-3		6./JG 77	105	75	5 September 1942	17:24	Il-2	55 km (34 mi) northwest of Voronezh	6./JG 77
74	44	9 July 1942	12:25	LaGG-3		6./JG 77	106	76	9 September 1942	15:52	Il-2	45 km (28 mi) northwest of Sloboda	6./JG 77
75	45	10 July 1942	06:20	R-5		6./JG 77	107	77	9 September 1942	15:59	Il-2	45 km (28 mi) northwest of Sloboda	6./JG 77
76	46	10 July 1942	06:25	R-5		6./JG 77	108	78	9 September 1942	16:03	I-153 (Note: According to Mathews and Foreman claimed as a P-40.)	20 km (12 mi) northwest of Sloboda	6./JG 77
77	47	10 July 1942	11:55	LaGG-3		6./JG 77	109	79	16 September 1942 (Note: According to Mathews and Foreman 15 September 1942.)	17:18	LaGG-3	40 km (25 mi) northwest of Voronezh	6./JG 77
78	48	11 July 1942	03:37	R-5		6./JG 77	110	80	16 September 1942	17:19	LaGG-3	25 km (16 mi) north-northwest of Voronezh	6./JG 77
79	49	11 July 1942	10:34	Pe-2		6./JG 77	111	81	16 September 1942	17:20	Il-2	25 km (16 mi) north-northwest of Voronezh	6./JG 77
80	50	11 July 1942	19:20	LaGG-3		6./JG 77	112	82	18 September 1942	13:07	Il-2	10 km (6.2 mi) south-southeast of Voronezh	6./JG 77
81♠	51	12 July 1942	06:35	LaGG-3		6./JG 77	113	83	18 September 1942	13:13	Il-2	10 km (6.2 mi) east of Voronezh	6./JG 77
82♠	52	12 July 1942	06:41	LaGG-3		6./JG 77	114	84	18 September 1942	16:25	LaGG-3	50 km (31 mi) south-southwest of Lipeck	6./JG 77
83♠	53	12 July 1942	06:50	MiG-3		6./JG 77	115	85	18 September 1942	16:55	Il-2	10 km (6.2 mi) east of Voronezh	6./JG 77
84♠	54	12 July 1942	10:49	LaGG-3		6./JG 77	116	86	19 September 1942	15:05	Il-2	50 km (31 mi) north of Voronezh	6./JG 77
85♠	55	12 July 1942	16:05	LaGG-3		6./JG 77	117	87	22 September 1942	13:05	Il-2	30 km (19 mi) north-northwest of Voronezh	6./JG 77
86♠	56	13 July 1942	09:33	LaGG-3		6./JG 77	118	88	22 September 1942	13:12	Il-2	30 km (19 mi) north of Voronezh	6./JG 77
87♠	57	13 July 1942	09:50	LaGG-3		6./JG 77	119	89	22 September 1942	13:17	Il-2	25 km (16 mi) northeast of Voronezh	6./JG 77
88♠	58	13 July 1942	09:52	LaGG-3		6./JG 77	120	90	22 September 1942	16:17	Il-2 (Note: According to Mathews and Foreman claimed as a Boston.)	25 km (16 mi) north of Voronezh	6./JG 77
89♠	59	13 July 1942	09:53	LaGG-3		6./JG 77							
– Claims with Jagdgeschwader 11 – In defense of the Reich — 1 April – 31 December 1943
121	91	17 July 1943	9:42	B-17	PQ 05 Ost TM-6; 95 km (59 mi) north of Ameland	I./JG 11	128	98	29 July 1943	09:30	B-17	PQ 05 Ost SU-6/1, Kiesby area	I./JG 11
122	92	25 July 1943	17:40 (Note: According to Mathews and Foreman at 18:00.)	B-17	PQ 05 Ost TM-7; North Sea	I./JG 11	129	99	17 August 1943	15:36	B-17	Niedermendig	I./JG 11
123	93	26 July 1943	10:58	B-17	PQ 05 Ost SO-5; 75 km (47 mi) west of Westerland	I./JG 11	130	100	17 August 1943	15:45	B-17	PQ 05 Ost RQ-2/5 south of Stromberg	I./JG 11
124	94	26 July 1943	13:25	B-17	PQ 05 Ost AO-5/5 north of Borkum	I./JG 11	—		17 August 1943	—	B-17		I./JG 11
125	95	28 July 1943	09:21	B-17	PQ 05 Ost RO-9/9; Thalfang east of Trier	I./JG 11	—		17 August 1943	—	B-17		I./JG 11
126	96	28 July 1943	09:25	B-17	PQ 05 Ost RO-6 south-southeast of Wittlich	I./JG 11	131		27 September 1943	11:10	B-17	PQ 05 Ost UP-1	I./JG 11
127	97	29 July 1943	09:20	B-17	PQ 05 Ost SA; 35 km (22 mi) north of Kiel	I./JG 11	—		4 October 1943	—	B-24	northwest of Borkum	I./JG 11

=== Awards ===
- Iron Cross (1939)
  - 2nd Class (17 September 1939)
  - 1st Class (4 July 1940)
- Honour Goblet of the Luftwaffe (20 June 1941)
- German Cross in Gold on 18 May 1942 Oberleutnant in the I./Jagdgeschwader 77
- Knight's Cross of the Iron Cross with Oak Leaves
  - Knight's Cross on 22 May 1942 as Oberleutnant and Staffelkapitän of the 6./Jagdgeschwader 77 (Note: According to Scherzer on 22 May 1942 as pilot in the 1./Jagdgeschwader 77)
  - 106th Oak Leaves on 23 July 1942 as Oberleutnant and pilot in the 1./Jagdgeschwader 77

== See also ==
- List of people who disappeared mysteriously at sea
