= Badum =

Badum is a surname. Notable people with the surname include:

- Johann Badum (1921–1943), German fighter ace and Knight's Cross recipient
- Lisa Badum (born 1983), German politician
