= 28 cm SK L/40 "Bruno" =

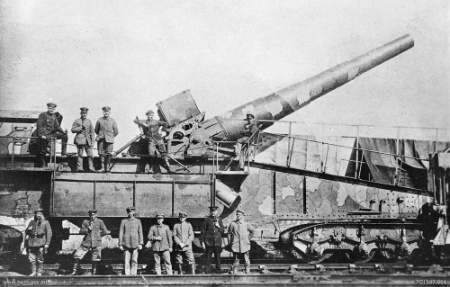
- side view of a "Bruno" and its crew in 1918
- Type: Railroad gun
- Place of origin: German Empire

Service history
- In service: 1917–45
- Used by: German Empire; Belgium; Nazi Germany
- Wars: World War I World War II

Production history
- Designer: Krupp
- Designed: 1916–17
- Manufacturer: Krupp
- Produced: 1916–18
- No. built: 22–24

Specifications
- Mass: 156 tonnes (154 long tons; 172 short tons) (E. u. B.)
- Length: 21.61 meters (70 ft 11 in)
- Barrel length: 10.401 meters (34 ft 1 in) L/40
- Shell: separate-loading, cased charge
- Caliber: 283 millimeters (11.1 in)
- Breech: horizontal sliding-wedge
- Recoil: hydro-pneumatic
- Carriage: 2 x 5-axle trucks
- Elevation: +0° to 45°
- Traverse: 2° 15' (E. u. B.); 180° (Bettungsschiessgerüst); 360° on platform
- Muzzle velocity: 740–785 m/s (2,430–2,580 ft/s)
- Maximum firing range: 20,050–27,500 m (21,930–30,070 yd)

The 28 cm SK L/40 "Bruno" (SK — Schnelladekanone (quick-loading cannon) L — Länge (with a 40 caliber barrel) was a German railroad gun. Originally a naval gun, it was adapted for land service after its ships were disarmed beginning in 1916. It served on the Western Front and on coast defense duties in Occupied Flanders during World War I. Belgium received four guns as reparations after the war. The Germans used two of those guns in World War II after Belgium's surrender during the Battle of France and on coast-defense duties on the Gironde Estuary for the rest of the war.

== Design and history ==
These 28 cm SK L/40 guns were used as the main armament of the Braunschweig and Deutschland-class pre-dreadnought battleships, but they were transferred to the Army from the Navy (Kaiserliche Marine) when those ships began to be relegated to training duties in 1916 after the Battle of Jutland had proved that they were not suitable for contemporary naval combat. One change made for land service was the fitting of a large counterweight just forward of the trunnions to counteract the preponderance of weight towards the breech. This, although heavy, was simpler than adding equilibrators to perform the same function. In 1917, the first four guns, formerly used on SMS Lothringen, were placed in firing platform (Bettungsschiessgerüst) mountings for coast defense duty as part of Batterie Graf Spee on the island of Wangerooge.

The firing platform was a semi-portable mount that could be emplaced anywhere after several weeks of labor to prepare the position. It rotated on a pivot at the front of the mount. The rear was supported by rollers resting on a semicircular rail and was generally equipped with a gun shield.

Twenty guns, from the battleships Braunschweig, Hessen, Preussen, Deutschland, Schlesien, and Schleswig-Holstein were mounted on the railroad and firing platform (Eisenbahn und Bettungsschiessgerüst) (E. u. B.) mounts successfully used by other German railroad guns.

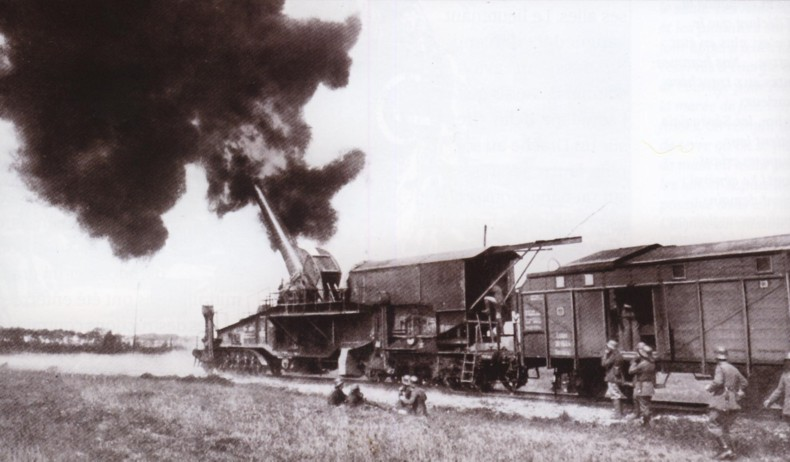
Note the prominent housing for the screw jack on the front of the mount and how the forward end of the ammunition car's roof has been slid back

The E. u. B. could fire from any suitable section of track after curved wedges were bolted to the track behind each wheel to absorb any residual recoil after the gun cradle recoiled backwards. It also had a pintle built into the underside of the front of the mount. Two large rollers were fitted to the underside of the mount at the rear. Seven cars could carry a portable metal firing platform (Bettungslafette) that had a central pivot mount and an outer rail. It was assembled with the aid of a derrick or crane, which took between three and five days, and railroad tracks were laid slightly past the firing platform to accommodate the front bogies of the gun. The gun was moved over the firing platform and then lowered into position after the central section of rail was removed. After the gun's pintle was bolted to the firing platform's pivot mount, the entire carriage was jacked up so that the trucks and their sections of rail could be removed. The carriage was then lowered so that the rear rollers rested on the outer track. Concrete versions were also used. It could have up to 360° of traverse.

=== Ammunition ===
Ammunition was moved by means of an overhead rail from which a shell trolley carried individual shells to be placed in the loading tray fixed to the breech. An extensible rail could be raised and braced in place to allow the shell trolley to reach shells placed on the ground or in an ammunition car behind the mount. This ammunition car sometimes had its own overhead rail to move the shells forward to where the trolley in the mount could reach it through a hatch in the roof. The shell and powder were manually rammed into the gun. The gun had to be loaded at zero elevation and thus needed to be re-aimed between each shot. It used the German naval system of ammunition where the base charge was held in a metallic cartridge case and supplemented by another charge in a silk bag which was rammed first.

| Shell name | Weight | Filling Weight | Muzzle velocity | Range |
|---|---|---|---|---|
| base-fused high-explosive shell (Sprenggranate L/2.9 m. Bdz.) (Note: The abbreviations stand for "mit Bodenzünder" (with base fuse).) | 240 kg (530 lb) | 15.9 kg (35 lb) (HE) | 785 m/s (2,580 ft/s) | 20,050 m (21,930 yd) |
| nose- and base-fused HE shell with ballistic cap (Sprenggranate L/4.4 m. Bdz. u. Kz. (mit Haube)) (Note: The other abbreviations stand for "und Kopfzünder" (and nose fuse).) | 284 kg (626 lb) | 22.9 kg (50 lb) (TNT) | 740 m/s (2,400 ft/s) | 27,750 m (30,350 yd) |

== Combat history ==
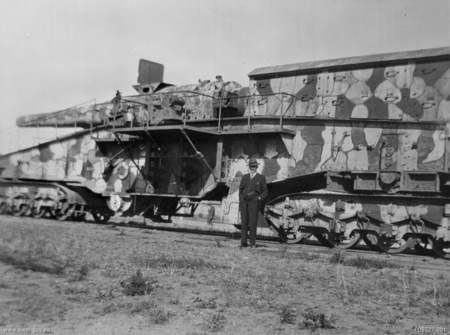
Amiens gun on display in Canberra

The Navy kept most of the "Brunos" and used them on coast-defense duties, mainly in Occupied Flanders to protect the ports of Ostend and Zeebrugge. Sailor Artillery Regiment (German: Matrosen Artillerie Regiment) 1 defended the latter with Batteries Hessen (3 or 4 guns) and Braunschweig (4 x "Brunos"). Those same sources disagree about the number of guns assigned to Batteries Hannover (3 or 4 (Note: although the Battery isn't covered explicitly.) "Brunos") and Preussen (4 guns) defending Ostende under the command of Sailor Artillery Regiment 2. Battery Rossbach, with 2 guns, saw service against the British during the German spring offensive in March–April 1918. Only two "Brunos" were given to the Army - they served in Battery 746 and Bavarian Battery (German: Bayerische Batterie) 1005. The latter gun, on E. u. B. mount No. 7, formerly carried by Hessen, was captured by the Australian Army on 8 August 1918. Its barrel is preserved today in Canberra, Australia, as the Amiens Gun.

After the Armistice was signed on 11 November 1918, a battery of four "Brunos" stationed in Belgium sought asylum in the Netherlands. They were given to Belgium as reparations. Six were destroyed in 1921–22 by the Military Inter-Allied Commission of Control.

After the surrender of Belgium on 28 May 1940, two "Brunos" were used by Battery 655 between 8 and 10 June to fire on Brimont and Reims from Amifontaine. One gun was destroyed when a shell detonated prematurely in the barrel while firing on those targets. By the end of 1941, two "Brunos" were assigned to Battery 721 and stationed at Le Verdon-sur-Mer defending the mouth of the Gironde Estuary under the command of Artillery Group Gironde-South (German: Artilleriegruppe Gironde-Süd). The battery was able to retreat to Germany by 1 September 1944 after the invasion of Normandy began in June 1944, but nothing is known of its activities afterwards.

== Sources ==
- Buckland, J. L. (1978). "The Amiens Railway Gun Story". Australian Railway Historical Society Bulletin (July). Australian Railway Historical Society.
- François, Guy. Eisenbahnartillerie: Histoire de l'artillerie lourd sur voie ferrée allemande des origines à 1945. Paris: Editions Histoire et Fortifications, 2006
- Jäger, Herbert. German Artillery of World War One. Ramsbury, Marlborough, Wiltshire: Crowood Press, 2001 ISBN 1-86126-403-8
- Kosar, Franz. Eisenbahngeschütz der Welt. Stuttgart: Motorbook, 1999 ISBN 3-613-01976-0
- Miller, H. W., Lt. Col. Railway Artillery: A Report on the Characteristics, Scope of Utility, Etc., of Railway Artillery, Volume I Washington: Government Print Office, 1921
- Rolf, Rudi (1998). Der Atlantikwall: Bauten der deutschen Küstenbefestigungen 1940–1945. Osnabrück: Biblio. ISBN 3-7648-2469-7.
- Rolf, Rudi (2004). A Dictionary on Modern Fortification: An Illustrated Lexicon on European Fortification in the Period 1800–1945. Middleburg, Netherlands: PRAK.
- Schmalenbach, Paul (1983). "German Navy Large Bore Guns Operational Ashore During World War I". Warship International. XX (2): 123–153. ISSN 0043-0374.
