= Kiesby =

- Ortsteil of Boren
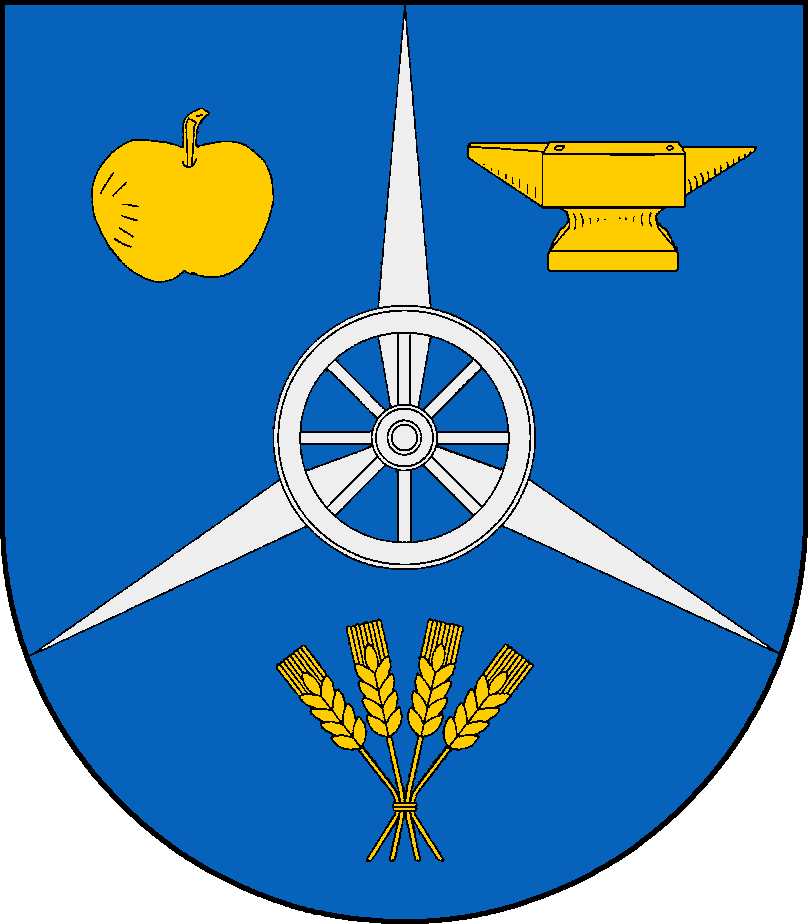
- Coat of arms
- Interactive map of Kiesby
- Location within Germany Location within Schleswig-Holstein
- Coordinates: 54°37′20″N 9°49′10″E
- Country: Germany
- State: Schleswig-Holstein
- District: Schleswig-Flensburg
- Municipality: Boren

Area
  - Total: 3.66 km^{2} (1.41 sq mi)
- Elevation: 16 m (52 ft)

Population (2006-12-31)
  - Total: 220
  - Density: 60/km^{2} (160/sq mi)
- Time zone: UTC+01:00 (CET)
  - Summer (DST): UTC+02:00 (CEST)
- Postal codes: 24392
- Dialling codes: 04641
- Vehicle registration: SL
- Website: www.suederbrarup.de

Kiesby (Danish: Kisby) is a village and a former municipality in the district of Schleswig-Flensburg, in Schleswig-Holstein, Germany. Since 1 March 2013, it is part of the municipality Boren.
