= Johann Badum =

German fighter ace and Knight's Cross recipient (1921–1943)

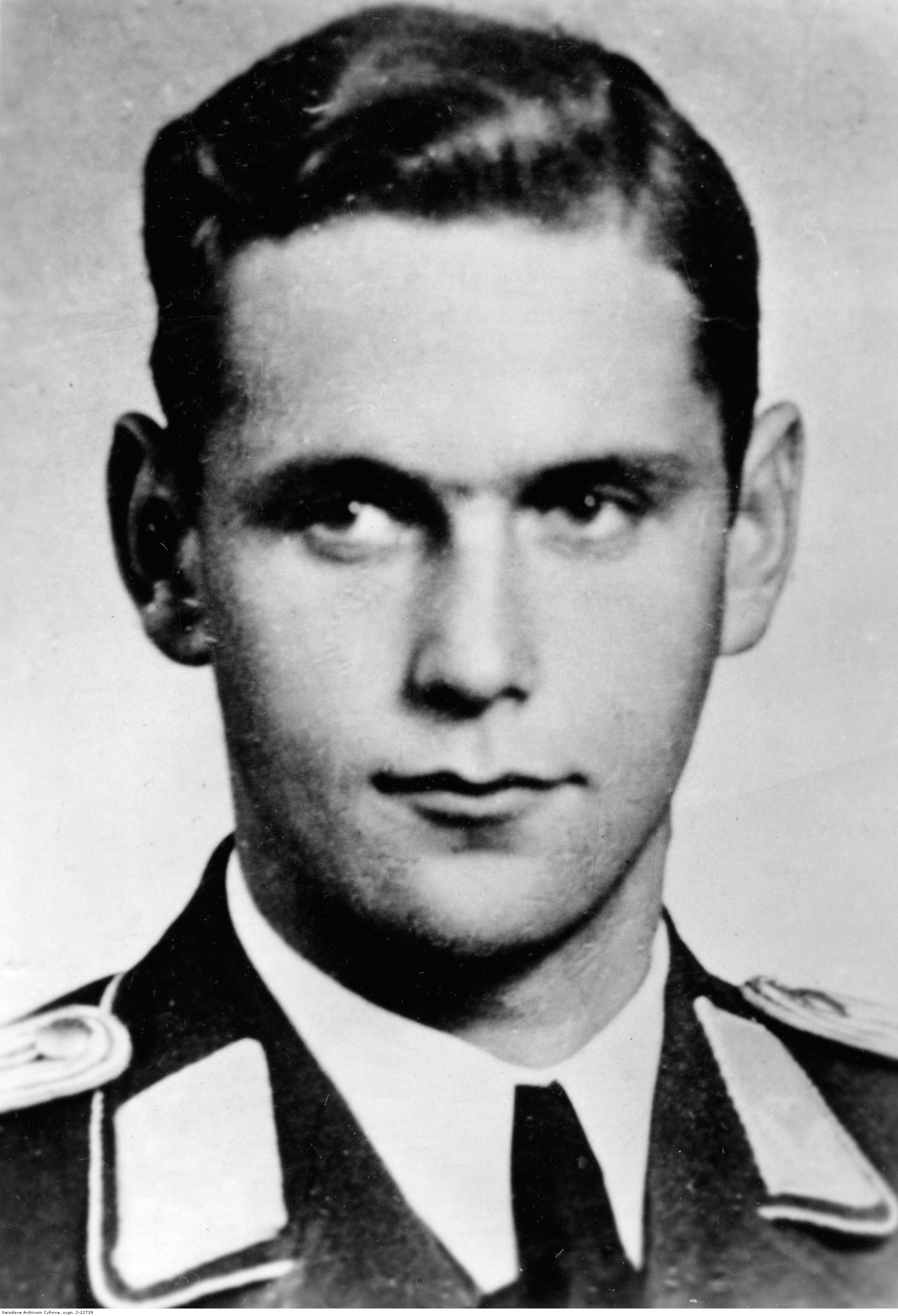
- Born: 2 March 1921; Ruthweiler, Germany
- Died: 12 January 1943 (aged 21); Giordani, Tunisia
- Cause of death: Killed in action
- Military career
- Allegiance: Nazi Germany
- Branch: Luftwaffe
- Service years: 1939–1943
- Rank: Leutnant (second lieutenant)
- Unit: JG 77
- Conflicts: See battles World War II: Eastern Front; North African Campaign †
- Awards: Knight's Cross of the Iron Cross

Johann Badum (2 March 1921 – 12 January 1943) was a German Luftwaffe military aviator during World War II, a fighter ace credited with 54 enemy aircraft shot down in approximately 300 combat missions. The majority of his victories were claimed over the Eastern Front, with three claims over the Western Allies in North Africa.

Born in Ruthweiler, Badum joined the military service in the Luftwaffe of Nazi Germany and was trained as a fighter pilot. He was then posted to Jagdgeschwader 77 (JG 77—77th Fighter Wing) in late 1941. JG 77 was based on the southern sector of the Eastern Front where he claimed his first aerial victory on 26 February 1942. Following his 51st aerial victory he was awarded the Knight's Cross of the Iron Cross on 15 October 1942. In December, JG 77 was withdrawn from Eastern Front and sent to Libya fighting in the North African campaign. There he was appointed Staffelkapitän (squadron leader) of the 6. Staffel (6th squadron) of JG 77. Badum claimed three more aerial victories before he was killed in action on 12 January 1943.

== Career ==
Badum was born on 2 March 1921 at Ruthweiler in the Rhine Province of the Weimar Republic. By January 1942 Badum was serving with the Ergängzungsstaffel of Jagdgeschwader 77 (JG 77—77th Fighter Wing) on the south area of the Eastern Front. The official designation of the Ergängzungsstaffel was 1. (Einsatzstaffel) Ergängzungsgruppe of JG 77. It was a single supplementary training Staffel (squadron) commanded by Hauptmann Erich Friedrich and subordinated to the Stab (headquarters unit) of JG 77 at the time commanded by Major Gotthard Handrick.

On 26 February 1942, Badum claimed his first aerial victory. At the time, the Ergängzungsstaffel was based at Mariupol on the north coast of the Sea of Azov. That day, he flew a ground attack mission to a Soviet airfield at Yeysk, his sixth combat mission in total. Following the attack, his flight intercepted a single Petlyakov Pe-2 bomber which exploded in midair follow his attack on the aircraft. On 15 March, Badum successfully attacked two locomotives near the Mius-Front. Patrolling along the Mius, he claimed his second aerial victory on 22 March when he shot down a Polikarpov I-16 fighter. Flying four combat air patrols along the Mius on 31 March, he claimed a R-10 aircraft, referring to either a light bomber, biplane or a Seversky aircraft. The next day, the Ergängzungsstaffel was disbanded and the pilots transferred to the three Gruppen (groups) of JG 77. In consequence, Badum initially ending up in 5. Staffel of JG 77 led by Oberleutnant Anton Hackl, a squadron of II. Gruppe under command of Hauptmann Anton Mader.

=== Crimean campaign ===
Badum claimed his first aerial victory with II. Gruppe on 21 April over a Polikarpov I-153 fighter in combat along the Parpach Narrows during the Battle of the Kerch Peninsula. At the time, members of JG 77 where involved in Bandenbekämpfung, referring to anti-partisan warfare, including Badum. On 10 May, Badum made a forced landing in his Messerschmitt Bf 109 F-4 due to engine failure. On 8 June, on his 100th combat mission, Badum shot down a Lavochkin-Gorbunov-Gudkov LaGG-3 fighter during the Siege of Sevastopol, it was his eleventh aerial victory.

Author Prien, who has analyzed letters sent by Badum to his family at the time, states that Badum's thinking was firmly rooted in Nazi ideology and mislead by the Nazi propaganda. In these letters, observations made by Badum were misinterpreted due to the teachings of the racial supremacy of the Aryan race.

=== 1942 summer offensive ===
On 28 June, German forces launched its strategic summer offensive in southern Russia named Case Blue. In support of this operation, II. Gruppe of JG 77 was ordered to relocate and moved to the area near Kursk. The Gruppe arrived at the airfield near Kastornoye, approximately 75 km (47 mi) west of Voronezh, on 5 July. There, the Gruppe supported the northern flank of Army Group South advance towards the Don. Fighting over the combat area between Voronezh and Yelets on 12 July, Badum claimed three LaGG-3 fighters shot down.

Badum became an "ace-in-a-day" on 13 August. That day II. Gruppe flew combat missions in the area of Voronezh where Badum claimed six LaGG-3 fighters shot down. On 15 September, he claimed two LaGG-3 fighters and an Ilyushin Il-2 ground attack aircraft, taking his total to 51 aerial victories. For this, Badum was nominated for the Knight's Cross of the Iron Cross (Ritterkreuz des Eisernen Kreuzes). He was awarded the German Cross in Gold (Deutsches Kreuz in Gold) on 3 October and the Knight's Cross on 15 October for 51 aerial victories claimed. The presentation of the Knight's Cross was made by Generalmajor Alfred Bülowius on 28 October.

=== North Africa, squadron leader and death ===
On 5 December, II. Gruppe of JG 77 was transferred to the North African theater, arriving at an airfield near Janzur, located west of Tripoli. The Staffelkapitän (squadron leader) of 6. Staffel, Hauptmann Erwin Clausen stayed in Europe because he had become ill with Malaria. During his absence, Badum was given command of 6. Staffel. Badum claimed his first two aerial victories in this theater of operations on 21 December. On a combat air patrol over the coast near Sirte, a Schwarm, a flight of four aircraft, encountered 12 Curtiss P-40 Warhawk fighters. In this aerial battle, Badum claimed two P-40 fighters shot down southeast of Sirte.

On 1 January 1943, Badum claimed his final aerial victory. In aerial combat near Buerat, he claimed a P-40 shot down. The aircraft may have belonged to Royal Australian Air Force (RAAF) No. 3 Squadron which lost two P-40s that day. On 12 January 1943, Badum was shot down and killed in action by USAAF Lockheed P-38 Lightning fighters. His Bf 109 G-2 trop (Werknummer 10727—factory number) crashed 18 kilometers (11 miles) southwest of Giordani, 45 kilometers (28 miles) west of Tripoli. That day, the USAAF sent a formation of Boeing B-17 Flying Fortress bombers to the Castel Benito Airfield escorted by P-38 fighters. Badum was killed while defending against this attack. His victor may have been Captain Darrel G. Welch from the 27th Fighter Squadron.

== Summary of career ==
=== Aerial victory claims ===
According to US historian David T. Zabecki, Badum was credited with 54 aerial victories. Obermaier also lists him with 54 aerial victories claimed in approximately 300 combat missions. This figure includes 51 claims on the Eastern Front and three over the Western Allies in North Africa. Mathews and Foreman, authors of Luftwaffe Aces — Biographies and Victory Claims, researched the German Federal Archives and states that Badum was credited with over 50 victory claims, possibly three further in Tunisia and one unconfirmed claim. All of his confirmed aerial victories were claimed on the Eastern Front.

Victory claims were logged to a map-reference (PQ = Planquadrat), for example "PQ 35391". The Luftwaffe grid map (Jägermeldenetz) covered all of Europe, western Russia and North Africa and was composed of rectangles measuring 15 minutes of latitude by 30 minutes of longitude, an area of about 360 square miles (930 km^{2}). These sectors were then subdivided into 36 smaller units to give a location area 3 km × 4 km (1.9 mi × 2.5 mi) in size.

Chronicle of aerial victories
This and the ♠ (Ace of spades) indicates those aerial victories which made Badum an "ace-in-a-day", a term which designates a fighter pilot who has shot down five or more airplanes in a single day. This and the – (dash) indicates unconfirmed aerial victory claims for which Badum did not receive credit. This and the ? (question mark) indicates information discrepancies listed by Prien, Stemmer, Rodeike, Bock, Mathews and Foreman.
Claim	Date	Time	Type	Location	Unit	Claim	Date	Time	Type	Location	Unit
– Claims with Jagdgeschwader 77 on the Eastern Front – 6 December 1941 – 31 March 1942
1	26 February 1942	—	Pe-2		1. Egr./JG 77	3	31 March 1942	—	R-10 (Seversky)		1. Egr./JG 77
2	21 March 1942	—	I-16		1. Egr./JG 77						
– Claims with Jagdgeschwader 77 on the Eastern Front – April 1942
4	20 April 1942? (Note: According to Prien's 1995 book, claimed on 21 April 1942.)	11:55	I-153		5./JG 77						
– Claims with Jagdgeschwader 77 on the Eastern Front – Kerch, Sevastopol, Izium — May/June 1942
5	1 May 1942	11:50	MiG-1? (Note: According to Mathews and Foreman claimed over a Polikarpov I-16.)		5./JG 77	9	3 June 1942	13:35	Yak-1		5./JG 77
6	7 May 1942	15:05	I-153		5./JG 77	10? (Note: According to Mathews and Foreman this claim is unconfirmed.)	5 June 1942	—	I-153		5./JG 77
7	8 May 1942	11:32	I-153		5./JG 77	11	8 June 1942	12:39	LaGG-3	PQ 35391	6./JG 77
8	13 May 1942	14:20	Il-2		5./JG 77	12	10 June 1942	08:23	Yak-1		6./JG 77
– Claims with Jagdgeschwader 77 on the Eastern Front – Summer offensive — 28 June – 7 November 1942
13	2 July 1942	10:30	LaGG-3		6./JG 77	33	12 August 1942	16:37	P-40	PQ 92382; 10 km (6.2 mi) south-southeast of Voronezh	6./JG 77
14	12 July 1942	06:42	LaGG-3		6./JG 77	34♠	13 August 1942	08:52	LaGG-3	PQ 92122; 30 km (19 mi) north of Voronezh	6./JG 77
15	12 July 1942	10:42	LaGG-3		6./JG 77	35♠	13 August 1942	09:15	LaGG-3	PQ 82233; 40 km (25 mi) north-northwest of Voronezh	6./JG 77
16	12 July 1942	10:43	LaGG-3		6./JG 77	36♠	13 August 1942	13:36	LaGG-3	PQ 83891; 50 km (31 mi) north-northwest of Voronezh	6./JG 77
17	22 July 1942	14:37	LaGG-3		6./JG 77	37♠	13 August 1942	13:48? (Note: According to Mathews and Foreman claimed at 13:46.)	LaGG-3	PQ 93543; 30 km (19 mi) south of Voronezh	6./JG 77
18	22 July 1942	18:31	Il-2		6./JG 77	38♠	13 August 1942	13:50	LaGG-3	PQ 83631; 25 km (16 mi) southeast of Yelets	6./JG 77
19	22 July 1942	18:34	Il-2		6./JG 77	39♠	13 August 1942	17:22	LaGG-3	PQ 92352	6./JG 77
20	24 July 1942	05:31	LaGG-3		6./JG 77	40	14 August 1942	14:03	Il-2; 10 km (6.2 mi) east of Voronezh		6./JG 77
21	24 July 1942	11:08	Hurricane		6./JG 77	41	18 August 1942	17:23	LaGG-3	PQ 92143; 25 km (16 mi) north of Voronezh	6./JG 77
22	24 July 1942	11:27	Pe-2		6./JG 77	42	18 August 1942	17:23? (Note: According to Mathews and Foreman claimed at 17:27.)	LaGG-3	PQ 92143; 25 km (16 mi) north of Voronezh	6./JG 77
23	24 July 1942	18:10	Pe-2		6./JG 77	43	25 August 1942	17:36	Il-2? (Note: According to Mathews and Foreman claimed as a Petlyakov Pe-2.)	PQ 72263; 55 km (34 mi) south-southeast of Livny	6./JG 77
24	25 July 1942? (Note: According to Mathews and Foreman claimed on 24 July 1942.)	13:57	LaGG-3		6./JG 77	— ?? (Note: This unconfirmed claim is not listed by Mathews and Foreman.)	25 August 1942	—	Il-2		6./JG 77
25	25 July 1942?	14:25	MiG-3		6./JG 77	44	3 September 1942	04:48	LaGG-3	PQ 92124, Kastornoye; 30 km (19 mi) north of Voronezh	6./JG 77
26	28 July 1942	19:00	Il-2	PQ 92133; 40 km (25 mi) north-northeast of Voronezh	6./JG 77	45	3 September 1942	04:52	LaGG-3	PQ 92132, Kastornoye; 40 km (25 mi) north-northeast of Voronezh	6./JG 77
27	28 July 1942	19:02	Il-2	PQ 92131; 40 km (25 mi) north-northeast of Voronezh	6./JG 77	46	5 September 1942	17:14	Il-2	PQ 82141; 65 km (40 mi) east-northeast of Tim	6./JG 77
28	28 July 1942	19:04	Il-2	PQ 93791; 50 km (31 mi) north-northeast of Voronezh	6./JG 77	47	5 September 1942	17:21	Il-2	PQ 82143; 50 km (31 mi) northwest of Voronezh	6./JG 77
29	29 July 1942	06:54	Pe-2	PQ 92112; 30 km (19 mi) north-northwest of Voronezh	6./JG 77	48	14 September 1942	12:05	P-39	PQ 92661; 55 km (34 mi) north-northeast of Sloboda	6./JG 77
30	6 August 1942	12:10	Pe-2	PQ 92163; 25 km (16 mi) northeast of Voronezh	6./JG 77	49	15 September 1942	06:50	Il-2	PQ 92143; 25 km (16 mi) north of Voronezh	6./JG 77
31	6 August 1942	18:05	Boston	PQ 82144; 65 km (40 mi) east-northeast of Tim	6./JG 77	50	15 September 1942	06:53	LaGG-3	PQ 92183; 15 km (9.3 mi) north of Voronezh	6./JG 77
32	12 August 1942	07:58	P-40	PQ 83831; 55 km (34 mi) south-southeast of Yelets	6./JG 77	51	15 September 1942	07:10	LaGG-3	PQ 82281; 40 km (25 mi) north-northwest of Voronezh	6./JG 77
– Claims with Jagdgeschwader 77 in North Africa –
— ?	21 December 1942	—	P-40		6./JG 77	— ?	2 January 1943	—	P-40		6./JG 77
— ?	21 December 1942	—	P-40		6./JG 77						

=== Awards ===
- Iron Cross (1939) 2nd and 1st Class
- Honour Goblet of the Luftwaffe on 13 September 1942 as Leutnant and pilot
- German Cross in Gold on 3 October 1942 as Leutnant in the II./Jagdgeschwader 77
- Knight's Cross of the Iron Cross on 15 October 1942 as Leutnant and pilot in the 6./Jagdgeschwader 77
