= Husum Schwesing Airport =

Husum Schwesing Airport Fliegerhorst Husum
- IATA: QHU; ICAO: EDXJ

Summary
- Airport type: Public
- Location: Husum, Germany
- Elevation AMSL: 19 m (62 ft)
- Coordinates: 54°30′55″N 009°08′41″E

Map
- Location of Husum Schwesing Airport

Runways
Direction	Length		Surface
Direction	m	ft	Surface
03/21	1,450	4,757	Asphalt

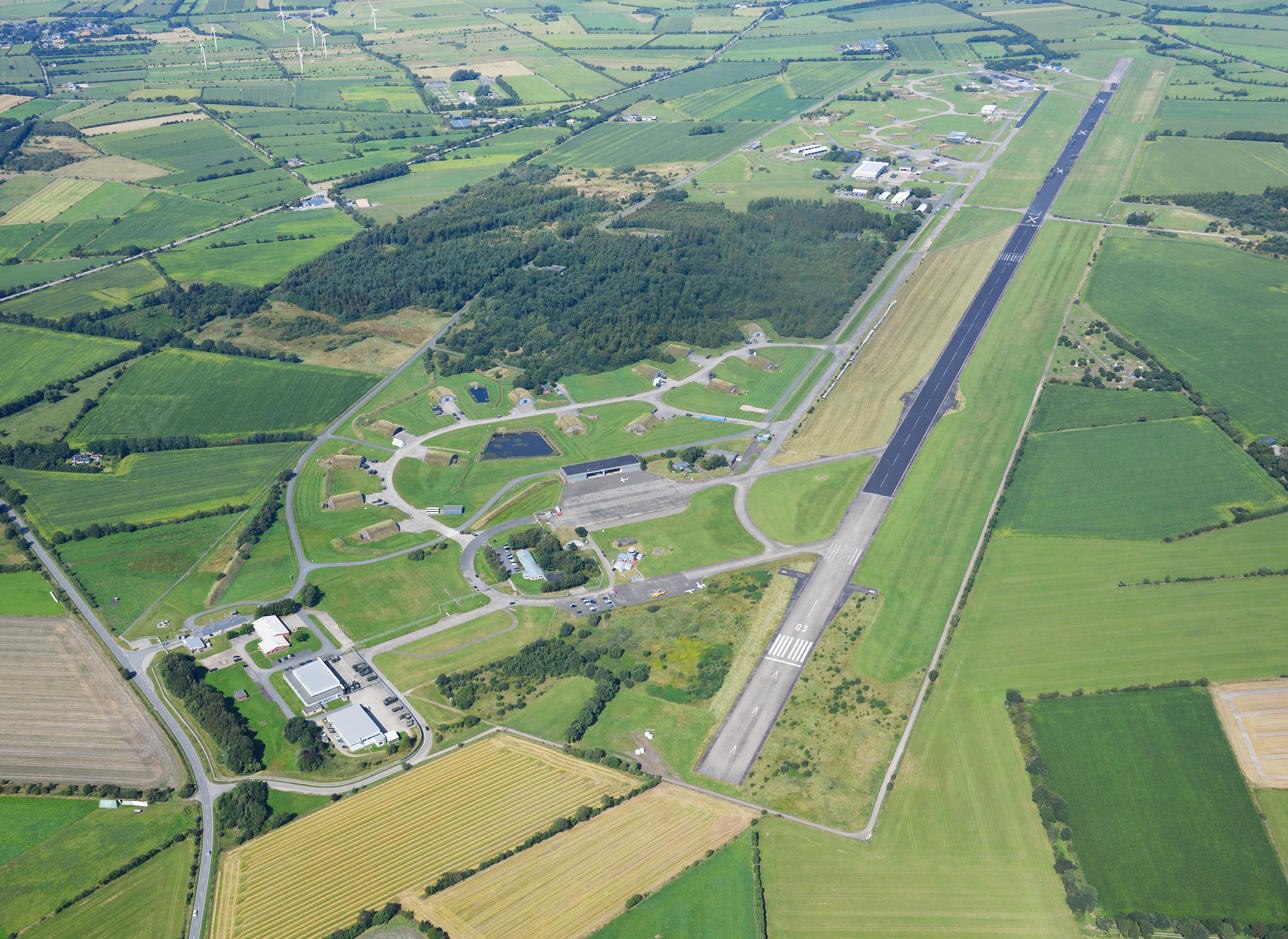
Aerial image of the Husum Schwesing airfield.

Husum Schwesing Airport (IATA: QHU, ICAO: EDXJ) is a regional airport in Germany. It supports general aviation with no commercial airline service scheduled.

== History ==
Fliegerhorst Husum was built by the Luftwaffe sometime during 1942-1944 as a decoy airfield for Husum-Narrenthal. After being captured by British Forces in April 1945, it was designed as Advanced Landing Ground B-172 Husum. The British Air Force of Occupation later converted it into a real airfield in 1946/1947 but no permanent RAF units were assigned to it.

The airfield remained in a care and maintenance status until 1959 when it was transferred to the new West German Air Force on 1 October 1959. It became home to JaBoG 35 (Jagdbombergeschwader35 of 35 Fighter-Bomber Wing) flying F-84 Thunderstreaks and 4 T-33 trainers. The Wing transferred to the new FIAT G-91 fighter bomber in 1966, signalling a new name for the unit. It was now known as Leichtes Kampfgeschwader 41 (LKG41 or 41 Light Attack Wing). With the transition to the Alpha Jet in 1980 the Wing was renamed again, this time becoming JaBoG 41.

When JaBoG41 disbanded after the end of the Cold War the southwest part of the airfield became a civilian airfield. The Northeast side remained part of the German Air Force, and became home to Flugabwehrrakettengeschwader (FlaRakG) 1 "Schleswig-Holstein" in 2001. FlaRakG 1 (English: Air Defense Missile Wing 1) was equipped with the MIM-104 Patriot Surface to Air Missile (SAM) and HAWK missile systems. The HAWKs were withdrawn in 2001. The group took control of the army's Mantis SHORAD (Short Range Air Defense) systems in 2011.

The military part is closed off from the civilian airport by a fence, which encompasses the former air base minus the civilian airfield and also crosses the runway. The civilian part of the airfield is in charge of the control tower, some hangars, a parking and 1450m of the runway (the southern half). It is run by the Flughafen Husum GmbH & Co. KG.

The airfield is open to aircraft up to 14 tonnes and helicopters up to 10 tonnes.
