= Boren, Germany =

Boren Borne
- Municipality
- Coat of arms

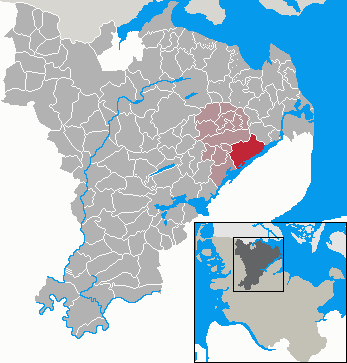
- Location of Boren; Borne within Schleswig-Flensburg district
- Interactive map of Boren; Borne
- Location within Germany Location within Schleswig-Holstein
- Coordinates: 54°37′N 9°49′E
- Country: Germany
- State: Schleswig-Holstein
- District: Schleswig-Flensburg
- Municipal assoc.: Süderbrarup

Government
  - Mayor: Paul Mallach (SPD)

Area
  - Total: 30.14 km^{2} (11.64 sq mi)
- Elevation: 16 m (52 ft)

Population (2025-12-31)
  - Total: 1,102
  - Density: 36.56/km^{2} (94.70/sq mi)
- Time zone: UTC+01:00 (CET)
  - Summer (DST): UTC+02:00 (CEST)
- Postal codes: 24392
- Dialling codes: 04641
- Vehicle registration: SL
- Website: www.suederbrarup.de

Boren (Danish: Borne) is a municipality in the district of Schleswig-Flensburg, in Schleswig-Holstein, Germany. It is situated near Denmark, on the Schlei inlet, on the south side of the peninsula Angeln.

== Geography ==
The nature of the soil is clayey, there are meadows and bogs. The municipality includes villages and settlements Albrovad (Allbrowatt), Bikum (Bicken), Bornæs or Bognæs (Boknis), Bornemark, Bornemose (Boorenmoor), Bremsvad (Bremswatt), Egenæs (Ekenis), Egenæslund, Egenæsmark (Ekenisfeld), Faartoft (Fahrtoft), Grabølvad (Grabbelwatt), Guderød etc. Gyderød (Güderott), Guderødmark etc. Gyderødmark (Güderottfeld), Gårdvang (Gaarwang), Hegnholt or Hegeholt (Hegeholz), Hyry or Hyrød (Hürye), Højrød, Kalvtoft (Kaltoft), Ketelsby (also Ketilsby), Kisby, Kisbymark (Kiesbyfeld), Knobberdam (Knopperdamm), Lindå (Lindau) with Lindåhøj, Lindåmark (Lindaufeld), Lindånæs (Lindaunis) and Mølleskov (Mühlenholz), Renbjerg or Rebjerg (Rehberg), Paverød (Pageroe), Tvegade( Twiestraße), Vadlyk (Wattlück), Ulvekule (Uhlekuhl), Vridam or Vridom( Wrium) and Ågeby (Akeby).

In total there are 31 individual villages and settlements.

The Lindånæsbro bridge located in the municipality connects the peninsulas Angel and Svans . At Lindå Nor by Slien is a larger campsite . Noret is separated from Slien by the two peninsulas Store and Lille Næs.

== History ==
Boren is first mentioned in 1260 as Bornebul (≈ Bornebøl, derived from female name Borne and -bøl or derived from g.da. bor for an elevation). A castle (Borneborg) is mentioned at the time of Valdemar Atterdag 1357. The place name Bikum is first documented in 1757, the older spelling is Bækkium.

In the municipality there are several dowels from the Peasant Stone Age and a so-called gallery Dutch mill, built in 1837 . The thatched manor house Dansk Lindå dates from 1415 . Borne Church was built in the 13th century. The vicarage is from 1793. The coal building opposite the farm is from 1874. The square in front of the church was Sliherred's central court square. In 1557.

St. Mary's Church was built in the first half of the 13th century. During renovations from 1938 to 1950, the baroque galleries and boxes were removed and the windows were made smaller, so it has been preserved in a relatively pure Romanesque style.

In 1974, the neighboring municipalities Ketelsby and Lindå were incorporated, in March 2013 Egenæs and Kisby followed . From Boren, a ferry used to go across the Slien to Siseby . There is perhaps an etymological connection to the village of Borntved (≈Bornes forest) on the opposite bank of Slien.

On 1 February 1974, the municipalities of Ketelsby and Lindau were incorporated. On 1 March 2013, Ekenis and Kiesby were added.

== Politics ==
After a representative appointed by the municipal authority (the last mayor of the old municipality of Boren) had taken on the duties of the municipal council and mayor since the merger with Ekenis and Kiesby, a new municipal council was elected on 26 May 2013. Of the eleven seats, the CDU and the General Voters' Group Boren (AWB) have each held four seats, while the Green Alternative List GAL has three seats. The municipal election on 14 May 2023 resulted in the following result:

Party	AWB	CDU	GAL
Seats	4	4	3
Vote Share	37.7%	35.6%	26.7%

=== Coat of Arms ===
Blazon : "In gold between two blue wavy bars a blue fish (snook), above a blue five-spoked wagon wheel, accompanied on the right by a green five-stalked sheaf, on the left by a green oak leaf, topped with three golden acorns."

Historical reason: The coat of arms of the new municipality of Boren, which was created on March 1, 2013 through the merger of the former, independent municipalities of Boren, Ekenis and Kiesbye, takes up the colors of the old municipalities. The central figure of the wagon wheel is taken from the coat of arms of the old municipality of Kiesbye. The five-spoked wheel is intended to represent trade, crafts, agriculture and tourism in general - and with equal importance. The number of spokes corresponds to the number of former municipalities and current districts that form the current municipality of Boren as a result of the incorporations in 1974 (Ketelsby and Lindau) and 2013 (Ekenis and Kiesbye). The wavy bars refer to the spring "Borne" near the Boren Thingplatz. The current place name Boren developed over the course of history from the Danish name "Borne". The snook was the staple fish of the snook fishing industry in earlier times. It stands for the Schlei region from Lindau to Ketelsby. The fish and wavy bar come from the coat of arms of the old municipality of Boren. The sheaf made of five ears of corn refers to agriculture, which still characterizes the municipality in large parts today. The number five corresponds to the number of districts. The oak leaf is borrowed from the coat of arms of the old municipality of Ekenis. It is a reference to the oak forests in historical times. The three acorns symbolize the three old municipalities of Boren, Ekenis and Kiesbye.

coat of arms before 2013 From 31 January 2008 to 28 February 2013, the municipality of Boren used the coat of arms shown below with the following blazon: "In gold bordered with blue, a blue cross. 1 a blue winged cross, 2 a blue oak branch with an acorn and two leaves, 3 two blue fishes one above the other and 4 three floating blue wavy bars." [ 16 ]

Historical explanation: The coat of arms shows the symbol of the Dutch windmill from 1837 for the district of Lindau, the oak tree for the district of Güderott and the fish for the Schlei region of Lindaunis - Ketelsby. The wavy bars symbolize the spring "Borne" near the "Thinkplatz", where court was held and where horses were watered in the Middle Ages. The place name Boren then came from the Danish Borne.

== Economy ==
Large parts of the municipality are agricultural. A tourist center is located on the Lindauer Noor on the Schlei.

== Notable people ==
- Frederik Valentiner (1756-1813), Danish astronomer
- Christopher Bluhme (29 August 1708 – 23 April 1782), Danish clergyman and writer
- Metta of Swabia (1636–1709), benefactor, conventual, prioress and the last of the noble family of Swabia
- Johannes Bernhard (1846–1915), senior pastor in Lübeck
