= Sloboda, Voronezh Oblast =

Sloboda Слобода
- Selo
- Location within Voronezh Oblast Location within Russia
- Coordinates: 51°08′N 40°17′E
- Country: Russia
- Region: Voronezh Oblast
- District: Bobrovsky District
- Time zone: UTC+3:00

Sloboda (Russian: Слобода) is a rural locality (a selo) and the administrative center of Slobodskoye Rural Settlement, Bobrovsky District, Voronezh Oblast, Russia. The population was 3,919 (2021 census) and 3,686 as of 2010. There are 34 streets.

== Geography ==
Sloboda is located 28 km northeast of Bobrov (the district's administrative centre) by road. Khrenovoye is the nearest rural locality.
