= SMS Hessen =

Battleship of the German Imperial Navy

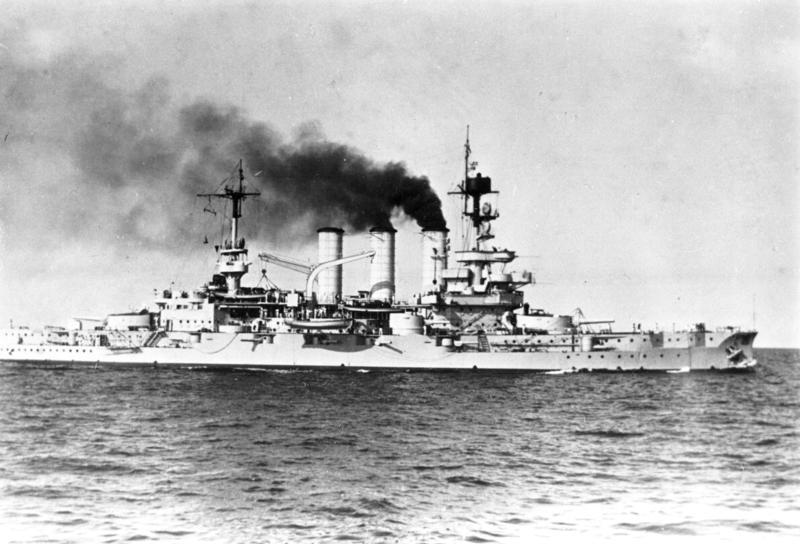
- Hessen ca. 1931

History

Germany
- Name: Hessen
- Namesake: Hesse
- Builder: Germaniawerft, Kiel
- Laid down: 15 January 1902
- Launched: 18 September 1903
- Commissioned: 19 September 1905
- Recommissioned: 12 July 1937
- Reclassified: Converted to target ship, 1937
- Stricken: 31 March 1935
- Fate: Ceded to the Soviet Union following World War II

History

Soviet Union
- Name: Tsel
- Acquired: 2 January 1946
- Commissioned: 3 June 1946
- Fate: Scrapped, 1960

General characteristics
- Class & type: Braunschweig-class battleship
- Displacement: Normal: 13,208 t (12,999 long tons); Full load: 14,394 t (14,167 long tons)
- Length: 127.7 m (419 ft) (loa)
- Beam: 22.2 m (73 ft)
- Draft: 8.1 m (27 ft)
- Installed power: 16,000 metric horsepower (15,781 ihp; 11,768 kW); 8 × water-tube boilers; 6 × cylindrical boilers
- Propulsion: 3 × triple-expansion steam engines; 3 × screw propellers
- Speed: 18 knots (33 km/h; 21 mph)
- Range: 5,200 nautical miles (9,600 km; 6,000 mi); 10 knots (20 km/h; 10 mph)
- Complement: 35 officers; 708 enlisted men
- Armament: 4 × 28 cm (11 in) SK L/40 guns; 14 × 17 cm (6.7 in) SK L/40 guns; 18 × 8.8 cm (3.5 in) SK L/35 guns; 6 × 45 cm (17.7 in) torpedo tubes
- Armor: Belt: 110 to 250 mm (4.3 to 9.8 in); Turrets: 250 mm (9.8 in); Deck: 40 mm (1.6 in)

SMS Hessen (Note: "SMS" stands for "Seiner Majestät Schiff" (English: His Majesty's Ship).) was the third of five pre-dreadnought battleships of the Braunschweig class. She was laid down in 1902, was launched in September 1903, and was commissioned into the German Kaiserliche Marine (Imperial Navy) in September 1905. Named after the state of Hesse, the ship was armed with a battery of four 28 cm (11 in) guns and had a top speed of 18 knots (33 km/h; 21 mph). Like all other pre-dreadnoughts built at the turn of the century, Hessen was quickly made obsolete by the launching of the revolutionary HMS Dreadnought in 1906; as a result, she saw only limited service with the German fleet.

Hessen's peacetime career centered on squadron and fleet exercises and training cruises. She was involved in two accidental collisions, with a Danish steamship in 1911 and a German torpedo boat in 1913. Hessen was slated to be withdrawn from service in August 1914, but the start of World War I in July interrupted that plan and she remained in service with the High Seas Fleet. She performed a variety of roles in the first two years, serving as a guard ship at the mouth of the Elbe, patrolling the Danish Straits, and supporting attacks on the British coast, including the raid on Scarborough, Hartlepool and Whitby in December 1914 and the Bombardment of Yarmouth and Lowestoft in April 1916. The following month, Hessen was present at the Battle of Jutland, the largest naval battle of the war. In the last daytime action between capital ships on 31 May, Hessen and the other pre-dreadnoughts of II Battle Squadron covered the retreat of the battered German battlecruisers away from the British battlecruiser squadron.

Jutland revealed how inadequate pre-dreadnoughts like Hessen were in the face of more modern weapons, so she and the rest of II Squadron ships were withdrawn from service with the fleet. She was decommissioned in December 1916, disarmed and used as a depot ship for the rest of the war. Hessen was one of the few obsolete battleships Germany was permitted to retain under the terms of the Treaty of Versailles. Rearmed, she served with the fleet in the 1920s and early 1930s, though she was withdrawn from front-line service in 1934. The following year, Hessen was converted into a radio-controlled target ship. She served in this capacity through World War II, also working as an icebreaker in the Baltic and North Seas. The ship was ceded to the Soviet Union in 1946 after the war, renamed Tsel, and served until she was scrapped in 1960.

== Design ==
Plan and profile drawing of the Braunschweig class

With the passage of the Second Naval Law under the direction of Vizeadmiral (VAdm—Vice Admiral) Alfred von Tirpitz in 1900, funding was allocated for a new class of battleships, to succeed the Wittelsbach-class ships authorized under the 1898 Naval Law. By this time, Krupp, the supplier of naval artillery to the Kaiserliche Marine (Imperial Navy) had developed quick-firing, 28-centimeter (11 in) guns; the largest guns that had previously incorporated the technology were the 24 cm (9.4 in) guns mounted on the Wittelsbachs. The Design Department of the Reichsmarineamt (Imperial Navy Office) adopted these guns for the new battleships, along with an increase from 15 cm (5.9 in) to 17 cm (6.7 in) for the secondary battery, owing to the increased threat from torpedo boats as torpedoes became more effective.

Though the Braunschweig class marked a significant improvement over earlier German battleships, its design fell victim to the rapid pace of technological development in the early 1900s. The British battleship HMS Dreadnought—armed with ten 30.5 cm (12 in) guns—was commissioned in December 1906, just over a year after Hessen entered service. Dreadnought's revolutionary design rendered every capital ship of the German navy obsolete, including Hessen and her sister ships.

Hessen was 127.7 m (419 ft) long overall and had a beam of 22.2 m (72 ft 10 in) and a draft of 8.1 m (26 ft 7 in) forward. She displaced 13,208 t (12,999 long tons) as designed and 14,394 t (14,167 long tons) at full load. Her crew consisted of 35 officers and 708 enlisted men. The ship was powered by three 3-cylinder vertical triple expansion engines that drove three screws. Steam was provided by eight naval and six cylindrical Scotch marine boilers, all of which burned coal. Hessen's powerplant was rated at 16,000 metric horsepower (15,781 ihp; 11,768 kW), which generated a top speed of 18 knots (33 km/h; 21 mph). She could steam 4,530 nautical miles (8,390 km; 5,210 mi) at a cruising speed of 10 knots (19 km/h; 12 mph).

Hessen's armament consisted of a main battery of four 28 cm SK L/40 guns in twin-gun turrets, (Note: In Imperial German Navy gun nomenclature, "SK" (Schnelladekanone) denotes that the gun is quick firing, while the L/40 denotes the length of the gun. In this case, the L/40 gun is 40 caliber, meaning that the gun is 40 times as long as it is in diameter.) one fore and one aft of the central superstructure. Her secondary armament consisted of fourteen 17 cm (6.7 inch) SK L/40 guns and eighteen 8.8 cm (3.5 in) SK L/35 quick-firing guns. The armament suite was rounded out with six 45 cm (17.7 in) torpedo tubes, all mounted in the hull below the waterline. One tube was in the bow, two were on each broadside, and the final tube was in the stern. Hessen was protected with Krupp armor. Her armored belt was 110 to 225 millimeters (4.3 to 8.9 in) thick; the heavier armor in the central citadel protected her magazines and propulsion machinery, with thinner plating at either end of the hull. Her deck was 40 mm (1.6 in) thick. The main battery turrets had 250 mm of armor plating.

== Service history ==
=== Pre-war career ===
Prewar postcard of Hessen

Hessen's keel was laid down on 15 January 1902, at the Germaniawerft shipyard in Kiel under yard number 100. The third unit of her class, she was ordered under the contract name "L" as a new unit for the fleet. (Note: German warships were ordered under provisional names. Additions to the fleet were given a single letter; ships intended to replace older or lost vessels were ordered as "Ersatz (name of the ship to be replaced)".) Hessen was launched on 18 September 1903; the vessel was christened by Princess Irene of Hesse, and her brother, Ernest Louis, Grand Duke of Hesse, gave a speech. The ship began shipyard sea trials on 16 May 1905, and was commissioned on 19 September. The Kaiserliche Marine then began its own sea trials on the ship, which was assigned to II Squadron of the Active Battle Fleet. Trials lasted until 4 March 1906, at which point Hessen joined her unit, bringing the squadron to its prescribed strength of eight battleships. The year was spent conducting squadron and fleet training exercises, including a summer cruise in July and August to Norwegian waters. During the fleet maneuvers held every autumn in late August and September, the fleet conducted landing operations at Eckernförde. Further exercises took place in the North Sea in November.

On 16 February 1907, the fleet was renamed the High Seas Fleet. Maneuvers in the North Sea followed in early 1907, which included a cruise to Skagen and mock attacks on the main naval base at Kiel. Further exercises followed in May and June, after which the fleet went on a cruise to Norway. After returning, Hessen went to Swinemünde in early August, where Czar Nicholas II of Russia met the German fleet in his yacht Standart. Afterward, the fleet assembled for the maneuvers that were held every August and September. This year, the maneuvers were delayed to allow for a large fleet review, including 112 warships, for Kaiser Wilhelm II in the Schillig roadstead. In the autumn maneuvers that followed, the fleet conducted exercises in the North Sea and then joint maneuvers with the IX Army Corps around Apenrade. Hessen was the II Squadron winner of the Kaiser's Schießpreis (Shooting Prize) for excellent shooting; at the time, her gunnery officer was then-Kapitänleutnant (Captain Lieutenant) Adolf von Trotha. In November, the ship took part in unit training in the Kattegat.

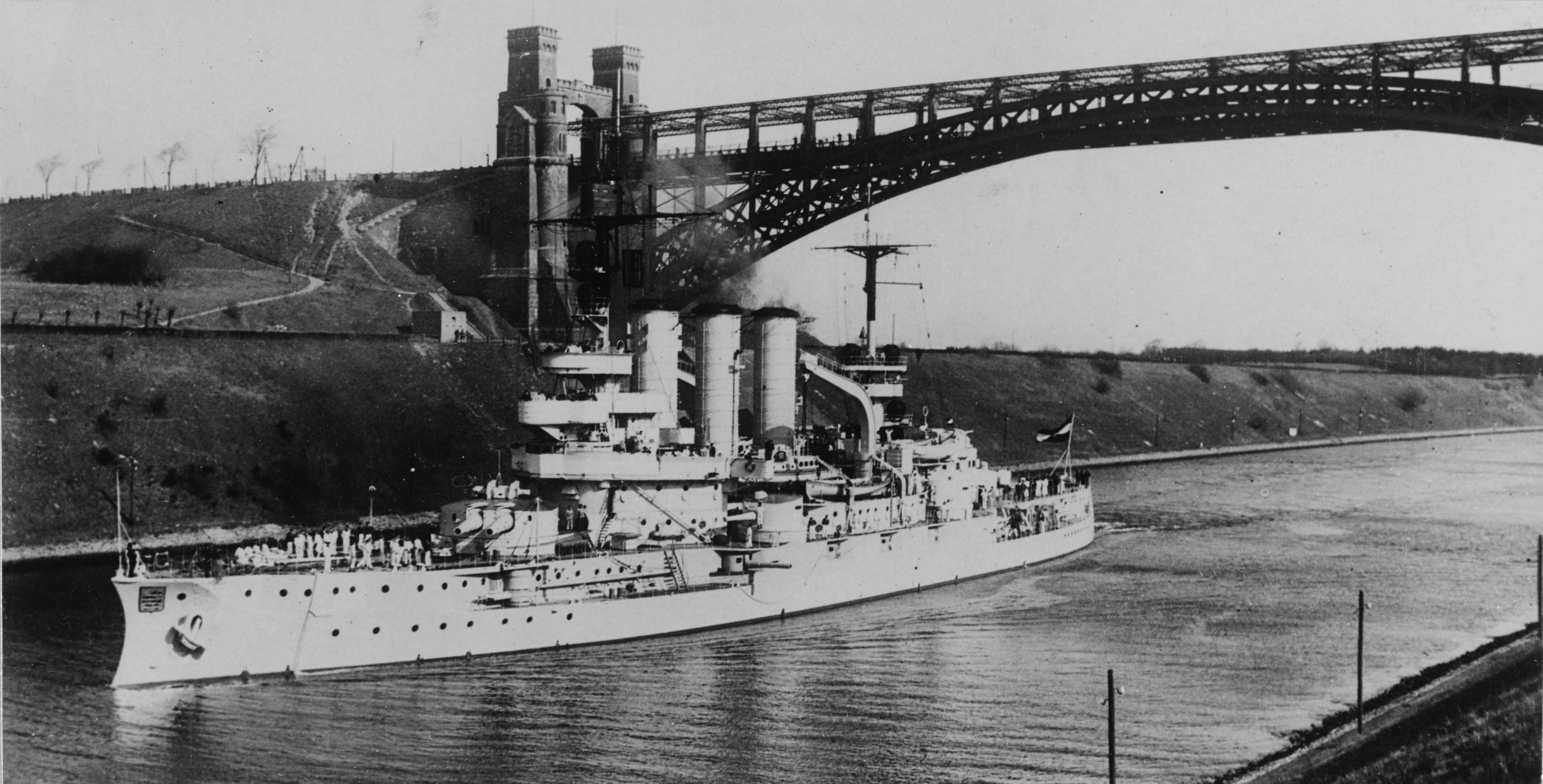
Hessen passing under the Levensau High Bridge in the Kaiser Wilhelm Canal

Hessen participated in fleet maneuvers in February 1908 in the Baltic Sea and more fleet training off Helgoland in May and June. In July, Hessen and the rest of the fleet sailed into the Atlantic Ocean to conduct a major training cruise. Prince Heinrich, the commander of the High Seas Fleet, had pressed for such a cruise the previous year, arguing that it would prepare the fleet for overseas operations and break up the monotony of training in German waters, though tensions with Britain over the developing Anglo-German naval arms race were high. The fleet departed Kiel on 17 July, passed through the Kaiser Wilhelm Canal to the North Sea, and continued on to the Atlantic. During the cruise, Hessen stopped at Santa Cruz de Tenerife in the Canary Islands. The fleet returned to Germany on 13 August. The autumn maneuvers followed from 27 August to 12 September. Later that year, the fleet toured coastal German cities as part of an effort to increase public support for naval expenditures. The next year—1909—followed much the same pattern as in 1908. Another cruise into the Atlantic was conducted from 7 July to 1 August, during which Hessen stopped in Ferrol, Spain. While on the way back to Germany, the High Seas Fleet was received by the British Royal Navy at Spithead. Late in the year, Admiral Henning von Holtzendorff became the commander of the High Seas Fleet. His tenure as fleet commander was marked with strategic experimentation, owing to the increased threat posed by the latest underwater weapons like submarines and naval mines, and to the fact that the new Nassau-class battleships were too wide to pass through the Kaiser Wilhelm Canal. Accordingly, the fleet was transferred from Kiel to Wilhelmshaven on 1 April 1910.

In May 1910, the fleet conducted training maneuvers in the Kattegat, between Norway and Denmark. These were in accordance with Holtzendorff's strategy, which envisioned drawing the Royal Navy into the narrow waters in the Kattegat. The annual summer cruise went to Norway, and was followed by fleet training, during which another fleet review was held at Danzig on 29 August. A training cruise into the Baltic followed at the end of the year. In March 1911, the fleet conducted exercises in the Skagerrak and Kattegat. Hessen and the rest of the fleet received British and American naval squadrons in Kiel in June and July. The year's autumn maneuvers were confined to the Baltic and the Kattegat. During fleet exercises on 23 August 1911, Hessen accidentally rammed and sank the Danish steamer SS Askesund. The crew of the steamer was rescued and there were no reported injuries; Hessen herself was undamaged in the collision. Another fleet review was held during the exercises for a visiting Austro-Hungarian delegation that included Archduke Franz Ferdinand and Admiral Rudolf Montecuccoli.

In February, during the very cold winter of 1911–1912, Hessen was employed as an emergency icebreaker in the Little Belt to rescue ships that were threatened by the heavy ice. In mid-1912, due to the Agadir Crisis, the summer cruise only went into the Baltic to avoid exposing the fleet during the period of heightened tension with Britain and France. In July 1913, Hessen collided with the torpedo boat G110. The torpedo boat suffered significant damage and three of its crew were killed, though it did not sink. The boat, along with the rest of her crew, was towed back to Kiel. Hessen was not significantly damaged in the accident. The annual summer cruise for 1913 returned to Norwegian waters, as did the cruise the following year. The year 1914 began quietly, with the only event of note being Hessen's visit to Sonderburg on 2 May to participate in the 50th anniversary celebrations commemorating the Battle of Dybbøl of the Second Schleswig War.

=== World War I ===
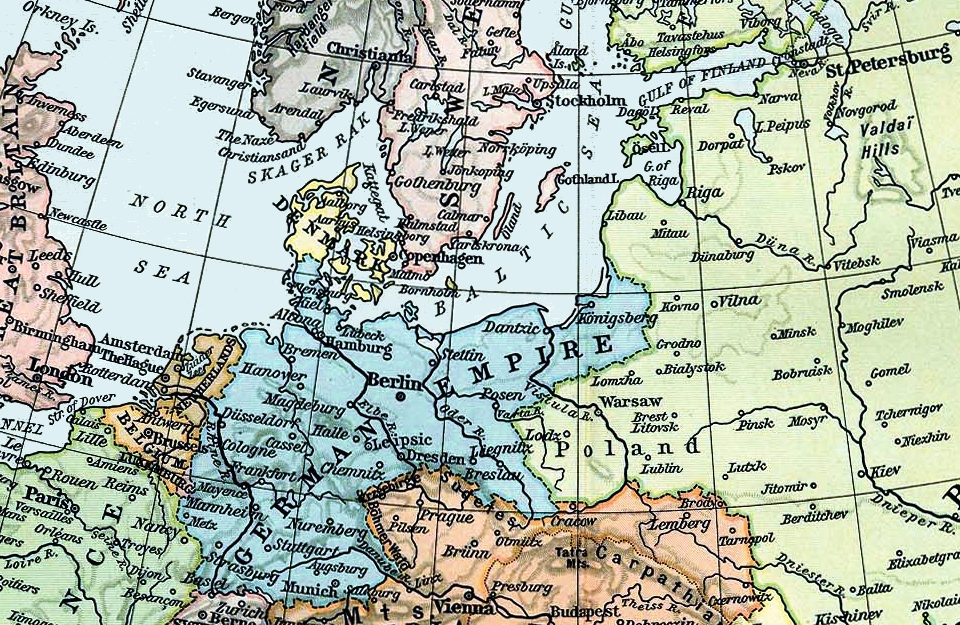
Map of the North and Baltic Seas in 1911

Beginning in late 1909, the navy had begun to replace the oldest pre-dreadnought battleships with the more modern dreadnought battleships, starting with the Nassau class. As part of this process, Hessen was scheduled to be withdrawn into the reserve on 26 August 1914, with her place in II Squadron taken by the new dreadnought König, but the rising tensions in Europe during the July Crisis, which led to the outbreak of World War I, interrupted that plan. Hessen therefore remained in service with the squadron, the oldest battleship in service with the main fleet. Following Germany's entry into the war in early August, Hessen and the rest of the squadron were sent to the Altenbruch roadstead to support the defense of the German Bight at the mouth of the Elbe. In October, the squadron went to the Baltic for maneuvers, and while transiting the Kaiser Wilhelm Canal on 26 October, she ran aground and had to be pulled free by tugboats. The squadron returned to the North Sea on 17 November, having completed the training exercises.

II Squadron joined the rest of the High Seas Fleet for offensive operations against Britain. The first of these was the raid on Scarborough, Hartlepool and Whitby on 15 December. The battlecruisers of the I Scouting Group attacked the towns in an attempt to lure out part of the British Grand Fleet, while the battleships of the High Seas Fleet waited in support in the hopes of ambushing and destroying any British forces that sortied out. During the night of 15–16 December, the German battle fleet of twelve dreadnoughts and eight pre-dreadnoughts came to within 10 nmi (19 km; 12 mi) of an isolated squadron of six British battleships. Skirmishes between the rival destroyer screens convinced the German commander, Admiral Friedrich von Ingenohl, that he was confronted with the entire Grand Fleet, and so he broke off the engagement and turned for home.

Hessen was in the shipyard in Kiel for maintenance from 22 February 1915 to 6 March, after which she returned to guard duties off Altenbruch, starting on 10 March. Squadron exercises in the Baltic took place from 18 March to 1 April, and further short periods of maintenance in Kiel followed on 17–18 May, 29–30 May, and 4–26 June; during the last stay, she had supplementary oil-burning equipment installed for her boilers. She spent the rest of the year in the North Sea, taking part in sorties on 11–12 September and 23–24 October. From 6 to 23 December, she went to Wilhelmshaven for maintenance, which was followed by squadron training in the Baltic from 25 December to 20 January 1916. She immediately went to the Reiherstiegwerft in Hamburg for more repair work, which lasted from 22 January to 15 March. On 26 March, after more Baltic exercises, Hessen was pronounced ready for further offensive operations.

On 5 April, the Admiralstab (Admiralty Staff) determined that ships of II Squadron should be periodically sent to guard the Danish Straits. Hessen performed this duty from 10 to 20 April, when she was replaced by Preussen. Hessen returned to the North Sea, and was present for another attack on the British coast on 24–25 April. This time, the battlecruisers bombarded Yarmouth and Lowestoft. During this operation, the battlecruiser Seydlitz was damaged by a British mine and had to return to port prematurely. Visibility was poor, so the operation was quickly called off before the British fleet could intervene and inflict further losses. Hessen relieved Preussen in the straits on 4 May, remaining there until the 20th. She returned to the rest of the squadron at Altenbruch on 23 May to begin preparing for the next major fleet operation.

==== Battle of Jutland ====
Diagram of the Battle of Jutland showing the major movements

Hessen took part in the Battle of Jutland on 31 May – 1 June 1916. Hessen and the five ships of the Deutschland class formed II Battle Squadron, under the command of Konteradmiral (KAdm—Rear Admiral) Franz Mauve. On 31 May, at 02:00 CET, VAdm Franz von Hipper's battlecruisers of I Scouting Group steamed out towards the Skagerrak, followed by the rest of the High Seas Fleet an hour and a half later. During the "Run to the North", Scheer ordered the fleet to pursue the British V Battle Squadron at top speed. The slower Deutschland-class ships quickly fell behind the faster dreadnoughts. By 19:30, the Grand Fleet had arrived on the scene, confronting Scheer with significant numerical superiority. The German fleet was severely hampered by the presence of the slower Deutschland-class ships; ordering an immediate turn towards Germany would have sacrificed the slower ships.

Scheer decided to reverse the course of the fleet with the Gefechtskehrtwendung, a maneuver that required every unit in the German line to turn 180° simultaneously. The six ships of II Battle Squadron, having fallen behind, could not conform to the new course following the turn, and fell back to the disengaged side of the German line. Mauve considered moving his ships to the rear of the line, astern of III Battle Squadron dreadnoughts, but decided against it when he realized the movement would interfere with the maneuvering of Hipper's battlecruisers. Instead, he attempted to place his ships at the head of the line.

Late in the day, Hessen and the Deutschland-class ships performed a vital blocking action that covered the withdrawal of the German battlecruisers. Vice Admiral David Beatty's battlecruisers had attacked the German ships in the darkness, which had turned westward to evade their attackers, and Mauve had continued in a southerly course, which placed his ships between the British and German battlecruisers. The British battlecruisers turned their attention to the pre-dreadnoughts, which in turn altered their course to the southwest in order to bring all of their guns to bear on the British ships. In the darkness, only muzzle flashes from the British ships could be seen; as a result Hessen and the other II Squadron ships held their fire. (Note: The German official history states that II Squadron fired 23 rounds of 28 cm ammunition at this phase of the battle, but according to naval historian John Campbell the individual ship logs recorded no such firing at this time; instead, the 23 shells were fired at imaginary submarines several hours later.)

At approximately 03:00 on 1 June, a group of British destroyers launched a torpedo attack against the German battle line. At 03:07, Hessen narrowly avoided a torpedo, but directly ahead, Pommern was struck by at least one at 03:10. The torpedo is believed to have detonated one of the ship's 17 cm (6.7 in) shell magazines, destroying the ship. Aboard Hessen, it was assumed that a submarine had destroyed Pommern; at 03:12 Hessen fired her main battery at an imagined submarine. She and several other battleships engaged imaginary submarines again at 05:06, and again at 05:13. Gunfire from Hessen and Hannover during the latter incident nearly hit the light cruisers Stettin and München; Scheer ordered them to cease fire. At 06:55, Hessen and Schlesien mistook a mine buoy dropped by the battleship Kaiser for a periscope and attacked it. In the course of the battle, Hessen had fired five 28 cm rounds, thirty-four 17 cm shells, and twenty-four 8.8 cm rounds. She was not damaged in the engagement.

==== Later operations ====
The experience at Jutland proved that the pre-dreadnoughts of II Squadron were a hindrance to the more modern units of the fleet, and so the Admiralstab decided that the ships should be withdrawn from service, as their crews could be used more effectively elsewhere. Hessen spent the remainder of 1916 alternating between guard duty off Altenbruch and the Danish Straits. On 18 November, she went to Krautsand to assist the dreadnought König Albert, which had run aground there. Starting in December, Hessen was employed as a target ship in the Baltic; this was to be her last active service during the war. On 12 December, she was decommissioned and disarmed, after eleven years of service with the fleet.

Hessen was thereafter used as a depot ship in Brunsbüttel for I Submarine Flotilla, along with the old coastal defense ship Beowulf. While in reserve at Brunsbüttel, Hessen was jokingly referred to as SMS "Kleinste Fahrt" (SMS "Shortest Voyage") because of a warning that had been painted on the ship's hull. The ship's four 28 cm guns were re-mounted as railroad guns and employed on the Western Front. The Australian Army captured one of the guns on 8 August 1918; it is preserved as the Amiens Gun at the Australian War Memorial in Canberra, Australia.

=== Reichsmarine and Kriegsmarine ===
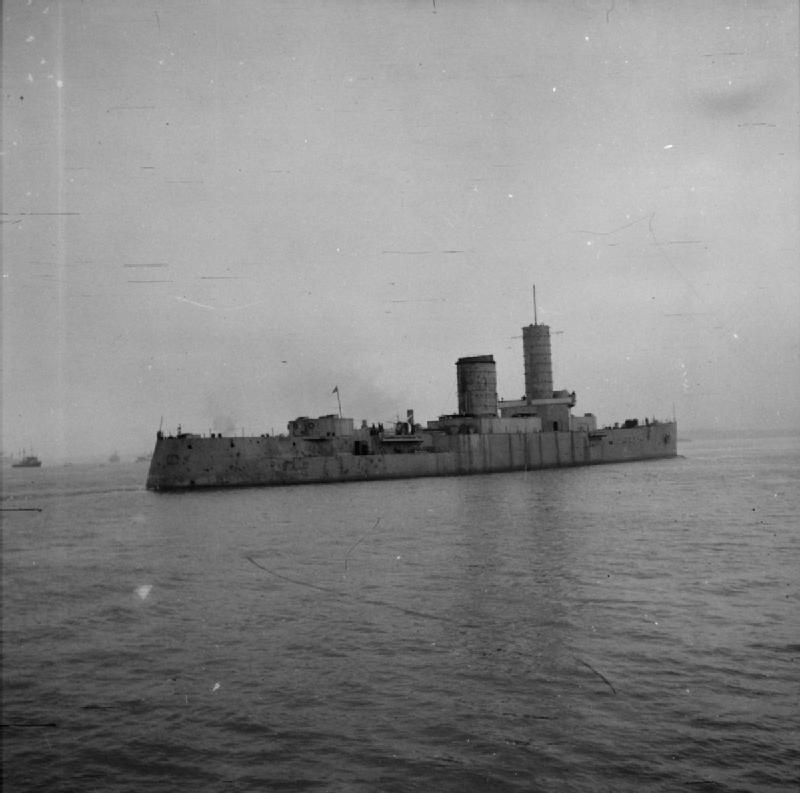
Tsel as a target ship in 1946

Following the German defeat in World War I, the German navy was reorganized as the Reichsmarine according to the Treaty of Versailles. The new navy was permitted to retain eight pre-dreadnought battleships under Article 181—two of which would be in reserve—for coastal defense. Hessen was among the battleships retained, initially as one of the vessels in reserve. After being refitted, rearmed, and slightly modernized, Hessen returned to service with the Reichsmarine on 5 January 1925. She received her old gun armament back, with the exception her tertiary battery; she received only four of the 8.8 cm guns, with another four in high-angle anti-aircraft mounts. Four torpedo tubes were installed in above-water casemates in the main deck. Her coal-fired cylindrical boilers were replaced with a pair of new oil-fired models. After spending the first half of the year conducting sea trials and individual training, Hessen joined the fleet for a voyage to Norway in June, reminiscent of the old peacetime summer cruises of the Imperial fleet. Fleet training exercises followed later in the year.

At the start of 1926, Hessen was tasked with clearing paths for merchant vessels in the iced-over Baltic. She also made visits to the ports of Libau, Latvia, and Reval, Estonia, during this period. The ship joined the pre-dreadnought Schleswig-Holstein, the flagship of VAdm Konrad Mommsen, for a trip to Spain that lasted from 12 May to 19 June. During the cruise, Hessen visited the Canary Islands and Cape Verde in the central Atlantic. In July, Hessen and the torpedo boat T190 visited Neufahrwasser; they were the first German warships to visit Danzig since Germany lost control of the city to Poland after the war. The next two years passed uneventfully, and in July 1928, Hessen visited Norway with Admiral Hans Zenker, the chief of the Reichsmarine, aboard. Another cruise to Spain took place from 18 April to 9 May 1929, with VAdm Iwan Oldekop flying his flag aboard Schleswig-Holstein. Hessen visited Caramiñal, Vilagarcía, and Ferrol, Spain, during the trip. Hessen steamed to Stockholm, Sweden, on 30 August, remaining there until 5 September.

A major fleet training cruise to the Mediterranean Sea took place in 1930, lasting from 3 April to 16 June. During the tour, Hessen stopped in numerous ports, including Vigo, Alicante and Cádiz in Spain, Palermo and Syracuse in Sicily, and Venice, Italy. Following the fleet training exercises in August and September that year, she visited Kristiansand, Norway. The fleet visited Świnoujście, Poland, on 18 and 19 April 1931 before returning to Hamburg. She cruised off Norway from 15 June to 3 July. At some point in 1931, Hessen had two of her 17 cm guns and all four of the low-angle 8.8 cm guns removed. The following year, she visited Gotland, Oslo, and Danzig, and in 1933 she made another trip to Reval. Hessen paid a visit to Bergen and Sognefjord, Norway, in July 1934 before participating in what would be her final annual fleet maneuvers later that year. She departed Kiel on 25 September and steamed to Wilhelmshaven, where she was decommissioned on 12 November. Her crew were sent to the new armored ship Admiral Scheer, which replaced Hessen in the fleet.

On 31 March 1935, Hessen was struck from the naval register and converted into a target ship. Her armament was removed, the hull was lengthened, and new machinery was installed. The longer hull allowed room for two additional watertight compartments, which brought the number up to 15 from the original 13. The ship's superstructure was cut down nearly entirely; Hessen retained only a single funnel, a tower foremast, and the two armored barbettes for the main battery turrets. Her reciprocating machinery was replaced with steam turbines. The ship had a crew of 80, but could be operated by remote control when being used as a target. The work lasted from 11 April 1935 to 1 April 1937; beginning in April, she conducted sea trials, and on 12 July she was formally assigned to the gunnery training unit, in what had previously been renamed the Kriegsmarine. The first ship to use Hessen as a target was the light cruiser Leipzig on 30 August that year.

Hessen served in this capacity through World War II. On 31 March 1940, Hessen acted as an icebreaker for the auxiliary cruisers Atlantis, Widder, and Orion, on their trip from Kiel to the North Sea. She and her control ship, the ex-torpedo boat Blitz, were ceded to the Soviet Union on 2 January 1946 in Wilhelmshaven. She was recommissioned on 3 June 1946 as Tsel (with Blitz being renamed Wystrel), and continued to operate as a target ship until she was scrapped in 1960.
