= SMS Oldenburg (1884) =

Armored corvette of the German Imperial Navy

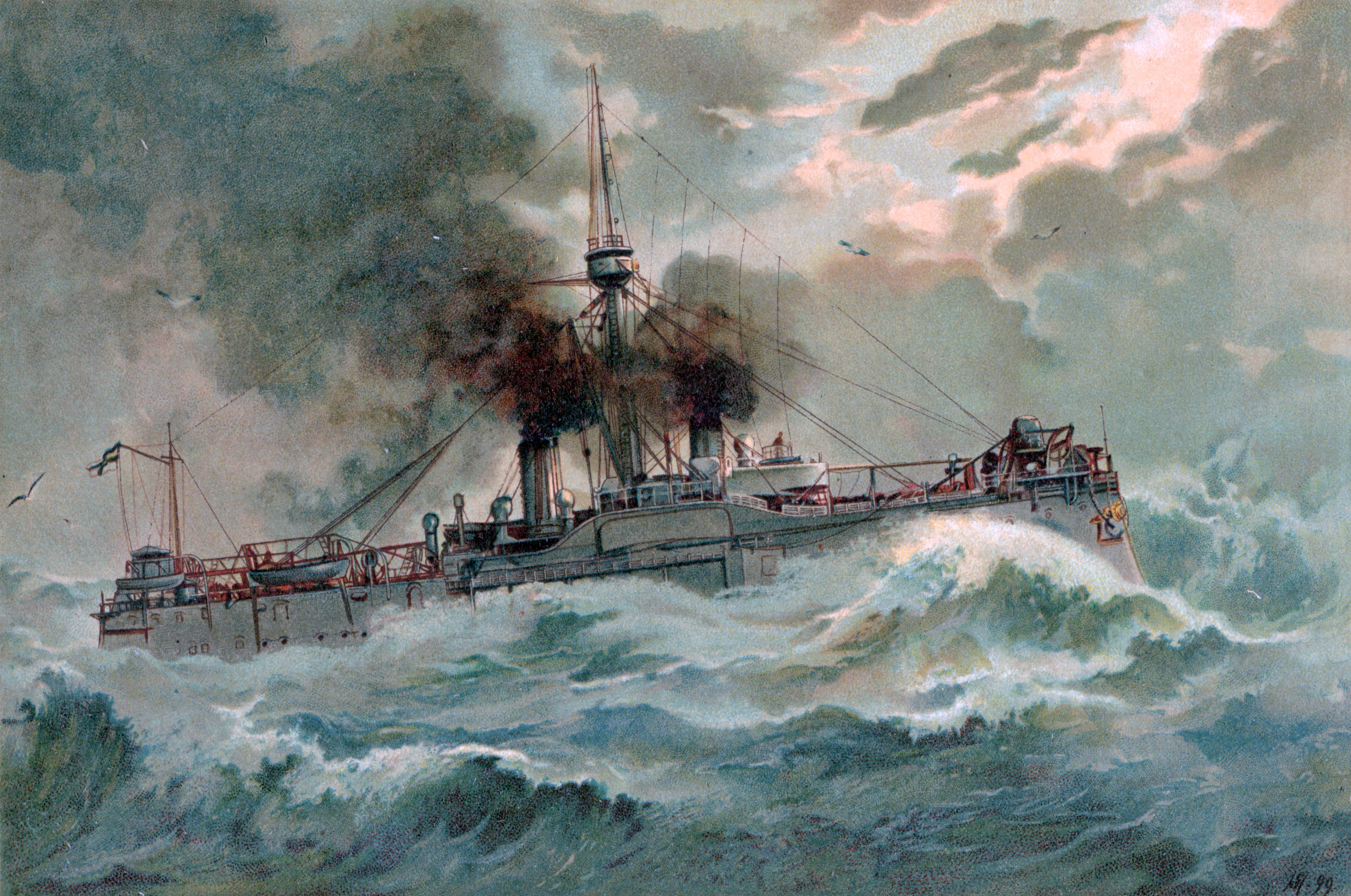
- A 1902 lithograph of SMS Oldenburg

Class overview
- Preceded by: Sachsen class
- Succeeded by: None

History

German Empire
- Name: SMS Oldenburg
- Namesake: Grand Duchy of Oldenburg
- Builder: A.G. Vulcan, Stettin
- Laid down: 1883
- Launched: 20 December 1884
- Commissioned: 8 April 1886
- Decommissioned: 1912
- Fate: Broken up, 1919

General characteristics
- Class & type: Armored corvette
- Displacement: Design: 5,249 t (5,166 long tons; 5,786 short tons); Full load: 5,743 t (5,652 long tons; 6,331 short tons)
- Length: 79.8 m (261 ft 10 in)
- Beam: 18 m (59 ft 1 in)
- Draft: 6.28 m (20 ft 7 in)
- Installed power: 8 × fire-tube boilers; 3,942 PS (3,888 ihp)
- Propulsion: 2 × double-expansion steam engines; 2 × screw propellers
- Speed: 13.8 knots (25.6 km/h; 15.9 mph)
- Range: 1,770 nmi (3,280 km; 2,040 mi) at 9 kn (17 km/h; 10 mph)
- Complement: 34 officers; 355 enlisted men
- Armament: 8 × 24 cm (9.4 in) L/30 guns; 4 × 15 cm (5.9 in) guns; 2 × 8.8 cm (3.5 in) guns; 4 × 35 cm (13.8 in) torpedo tubes
- Armor: Belt: 200 to 300 mm (7.9 to 11.8 in); Battery: 150 mm (5.9 in)

SMS Oldenburg (Note: "SMS" stands for "Seiner Majestät Schiff", or "His Majesty's Ship".) was an armored warship of the German Kaiserliche Marine (Imperial Navy). Laid down at the AG Vulcan shipyard in Stettin in 1883, the ship was launched in December 1884 and commissioned into the Navy in April 1886. Oldenburg was intended to have been a fifth member of the Sachsen class of sortie corvettes, but budgetary limitations and dissatisfaction with the Sachsen class prompted a redesign that bore little resemblance to the earlier vessels. Oldenburg mounted her main battery of eight 24 cm (9.4 in) guns amidships, six in a central casemate on the main deck and two directly above them on the broadside. She was the first German capital ship constructed entirely from German-made steel.

Oldenburg did not see significant service with the German Navy. She participated in fleet training maneuvers in the late-1880s and early 1890s, but she spent the majority of the 1890s in reserve. Her only major deployment came in 1897–1898 when she joined an international naval demonstration to protest the Greek annexation of Crete. In 1900, she was withdrawn from active duty and used as a harbor defense ship. From 1912 to 1919, she was used by the High Seas Fleet as a target ship; she was sold for scrapping in 1919 and broken up that year.

== Design ==
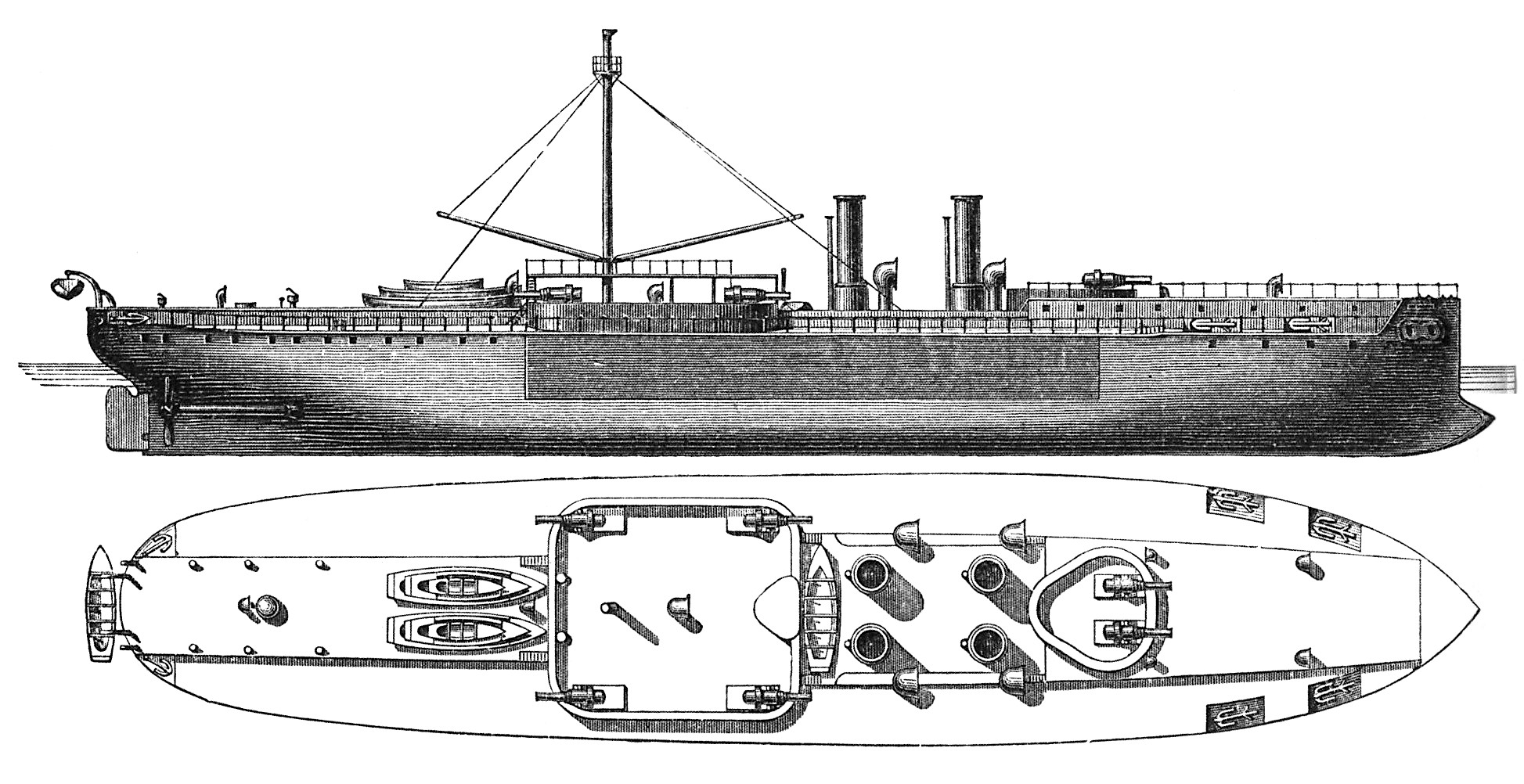
Illustration of the Sachsen class, of which Oldenburg was originally to have been a member

Following the Franco-Prussian War of 1870–1871, General Albrecht von Stosch became the Chief of the Imperial Admiralty; he immediately set about drafting a new fleet plan that was based on the previous program that had been approved in 1867. Stosch saw the role of the navy as primarily defensive; a fleet of ironclad warships would be kept in German waters to defend the coast against the type of blockade the Danish Navy had imposed during the Second Schleswig War and the French Navy had put into place during the Franco-Prussian conflict. Stosch's fleet plan, finalized in 1873, called for a total of eight ocean-going ironclads and six smaller, armored corvettes suited for operations in coastal waters. The ocean-going component had been completed with the Kaiser class, and of the six corvettes, five had been built: Hansa and the four Sachsens. The last corvette was originally intended to be a fifth Sachsen-type vessel, but dissatisfaction with the design led many senior officers to push for a revised version.

Work on the new design began in 1879, but parliamentary objections to naval expenditures, particularly after the accidental sinking of the ironclad Grosser Kurfürst in 1878, delayed construction of the vessel. Stosch initially sought to secure funding for two ships of the design, with the intention to retain one as a material reserve to be mobilized in the event of war, but the Reichstag refused. Stosch proposed the new vessel for the 1879–1880 fiscal year, which was refused, leading him to drop the request for the next year's budget. Finally on 7 December 1881, the parliament voted to approve funds for Oldenburg, albeit an amount significantly less than the navy desired. The budgetary constraints severely limited the ability of the design staff to produce an effective improvement on the Sachsens. On the available budget, the new ship's displacement would have to be reduced by some 2,000 t (1,968 long tons) compared to the Sachsens. The limited displacement forced a reversion to the casemate ship arrangement, as well as a reduction in the caliber of guns from 26 cm (10.2 in) to 24 cm (9.4 in). To somewhat offset the reduction in offensive power, these guns were of a new, longer 30-caliber type that had a higher muzzle velocity than the shorter 22-caliber guns carried by the Sachsen class.

Assessment of the design is mixed; the ship was an anachronism, being the last casemate ship to be laid down by any navy (though the Ottoman ironclad Hamidiye was completed later). The naval historian Erich Gröner states that Oldenburg was an "experimental design, of no real value in combat." Conway's All the World's Fighting Ships concurs, stating that Oldenburg was "considered to be of little fighting value by the time she was completed." The historian Aidan Dodson criticized the ship as being "a poor investment [that] failed to make her designed speed by 0.2 knots (0.37 km/h; 0.23 mph) and had a form that lead to a rapid drop-off of speed in head seas." The 1889 edition of the Brassey's Naval Annual reported a contradictory opinion, however, stating that "The majority of German naval critics are dissatisfied to a greater or less extent with all of these vessels, the König Wilhelm, Kaiser, Deutschland, and Oldenburg excepted."

=== General characteristics ===
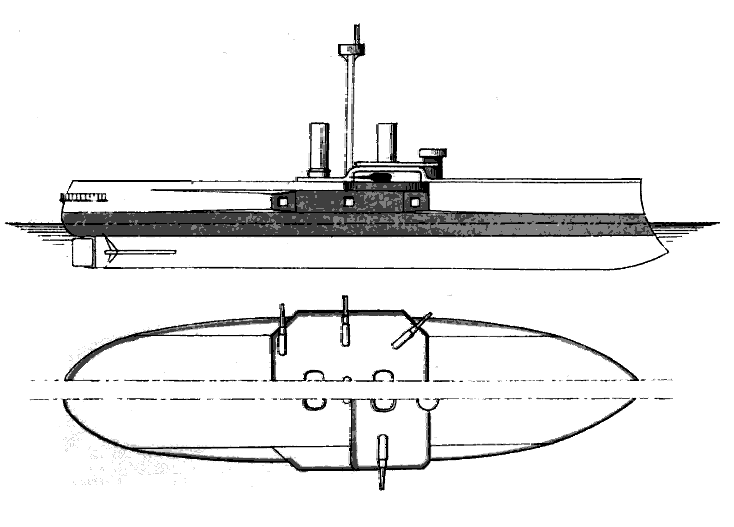
Plan and profile drawing of Oldenburg; the shaded areas represent the portion of the ship protected by armor

Oldenburg was 78.4 m (257 ft 3 in) long at the waterline and 79.8 m (261 ft 10 in) long overall. She had a beam of 18 m (59 ft 1 in) and a draft of 6.28 m (20 ft 7 in) forward and 6.3 m (20 ft 8 in) aft. As designed, the vessel displaced 5,249 metric tons (5,166 long tons; 5,786 short tons), and when fully loaded, her displacement increased to 5,743 t (5,652 long tons; 6,331 short tons). Her hull was constructed with transverse and longitudinal steel frames; iron was used for the stem and stern. The hull was divided into twelve watertight compartments and incorporated a double bottom that ran for 60 percent of the length of its length. As was common for capital ships of the era, Oldenburg's hull was fitted with a pronounced ram bow. The ship had a conning tower forward with a short hurricane deck directly astern; a smaller, secondary conning position was placed further aft. The ship was fitted with a single heavy military mast with a fighting top, which was located amidships. A smaller pole mast was placed near the stern. Oldenburg was the first German capital ship built entirely from German-made steel, apart from her stern.

The German navy regarded Oldenburg as an adequate sea boat, though she suffered from significant pitching. As a result of her tendency to pitch severely, a 60 t (59-long-ton; 66-short-ton) ballast was permanently installed in the bow. She also lost a great deal of speed in heavy seas; at conditions above Beaufort sea state 6, this could be up to a 25 percent loss of speed. The ship could not operate under severe weather conditions. Her transverse metacentric height was 0.63 m (2 ft 1 in). Her standard complement consisted of 34 officers and 355 enlisted men, though her crew was later reorganized to 32 officers and 401 enlisted sailors. She carried a number of smaller boats, including one picket boat, one launch, two pinnaces, two cutters, two yawls, and one dinghy.

=== Machinery ===
Oldenburg was powered by two horizontal 4-cylinder double-expansion steam engines in separate engine rooms; the two engines each drove a three-bladed screw propeller that was 4.50 m (14.8 ft) in diameter. Steam was provided to the engines by eight transverse, cylindrical fire-tube boilers, divided into two boiler rooms. Each boiler was equipped with three fireboxes, for a total of 24, which operated at up to 5 standard atmospheres (510 kPa) using forced draft. The boiler rooms were vented through a pair of funnels, which were placed fore and aft of the main mast. The engines were designed to operate at 3,900 metric horsepower (3,800 ihp) for a top speed of 14 knots (26 km/h; 16 mph). On speed trials, her engines slightly exceeded the designed horsepower, at 3,942 PS (3,888 ihp), though Oldenburg made only 13.8 knots (25.6 km/h; 15.9 mph).

The ship's coal storage was severely limited due to the size constraints imposed by the authorized budget. She was designed to store 348 t (343 long tons; 384 short tons) of coal normally, though she could accommodate up to 450 t (440 long tons; 500 short tons) under wartime conditions. An additional 120 t (120 long tons; 130 short tons) of coal could be stored on her deck for longer voyages. At a cruising speed of 9 knots (17 km/h; 10 mph), Oldenburg could steam for 1,770 nautical miles (3,280 km; 2,040 mi). Increasing her speed by one knot reduced her range to 1,370 nmi (2,540 km; 1,580 mi), and at 12 knots (22 km/h; 14 mph), she could cruise for only 980 nmi (1,810 km; 1,130 mi). In comparison, the Sachsen-class ships could steam for 1,940 nautical miles (3,590 km; 2,230 mi) at 10 knots. Steering was controlled by a single rudder. She was equipped with three electric generators with a total output of 29 kilowatts at 65 volts.

=== Armament and armor ===
Oldenburg carried eight 24 cm (9.4 in) MRK L/30 hooped guns in an unusual configuration: six guns on the main deck, one on each broadside, four in embrasures at each corner of the central battery, which was sponsoned over the hull to give a measure of end-on fire, and two on the upper deck firing broadside. These guns were supplied with 494 rounds of ammunition, and could depress to −5° and elevate to 8°. This enabled a maximum range of 5,700 to 8,800 m (6,200 to 9,600 yd). Her secondary battery consisted of four 15 cm (5.9 in) L/22 guns in single mounts. For close-range defense against torpedo boats, she carried a pair of 8.7 cm (3.4 in) L/24 guns in single mounts. Later in her career, she received another six of these guns to strengthen her defensive capabilities. Four 35 cm (13.8 in) torpedo tubes rounded out her armament. One was mounted in the bow, submerged, two were placed on the broadside above water, and the fourth was located in the stern, also above water. She carried ten torpedoes.

Oldenburg's armor consisted of compound steel backed with teak; the steel was fabricated by the Dillinger Works. The main armored belt was composed of two strakes; the steel upper strake was 300 mm (11.8 in) thick in the central citadel, where it protected the ship's vitals. The belt was reduced on either end of the central portion to 200 mm (7.9 in). The lower strake was 250 mm (9.8 in) thick in the central section and 180 mm (7.1 in) on either end. The entire belt was backed with 250 mm of teak amidships and 300 mm of teak on either end. The sides of the armored casemates for the main battery were 150 mm (5.9 in) thick. The ship's deck was 30 mm (1.2 in) thick. Her forward conning tower had 50 mm (2 in) thick sides and a 25 mm (0.98 in) thick roof. The rear conning tower was given only splinter protection, with 15 mm (0.59 in) thick sides and a 12 mm (0.47 in) thick roof.

== Service history ==
=== Construction – 1890 ===
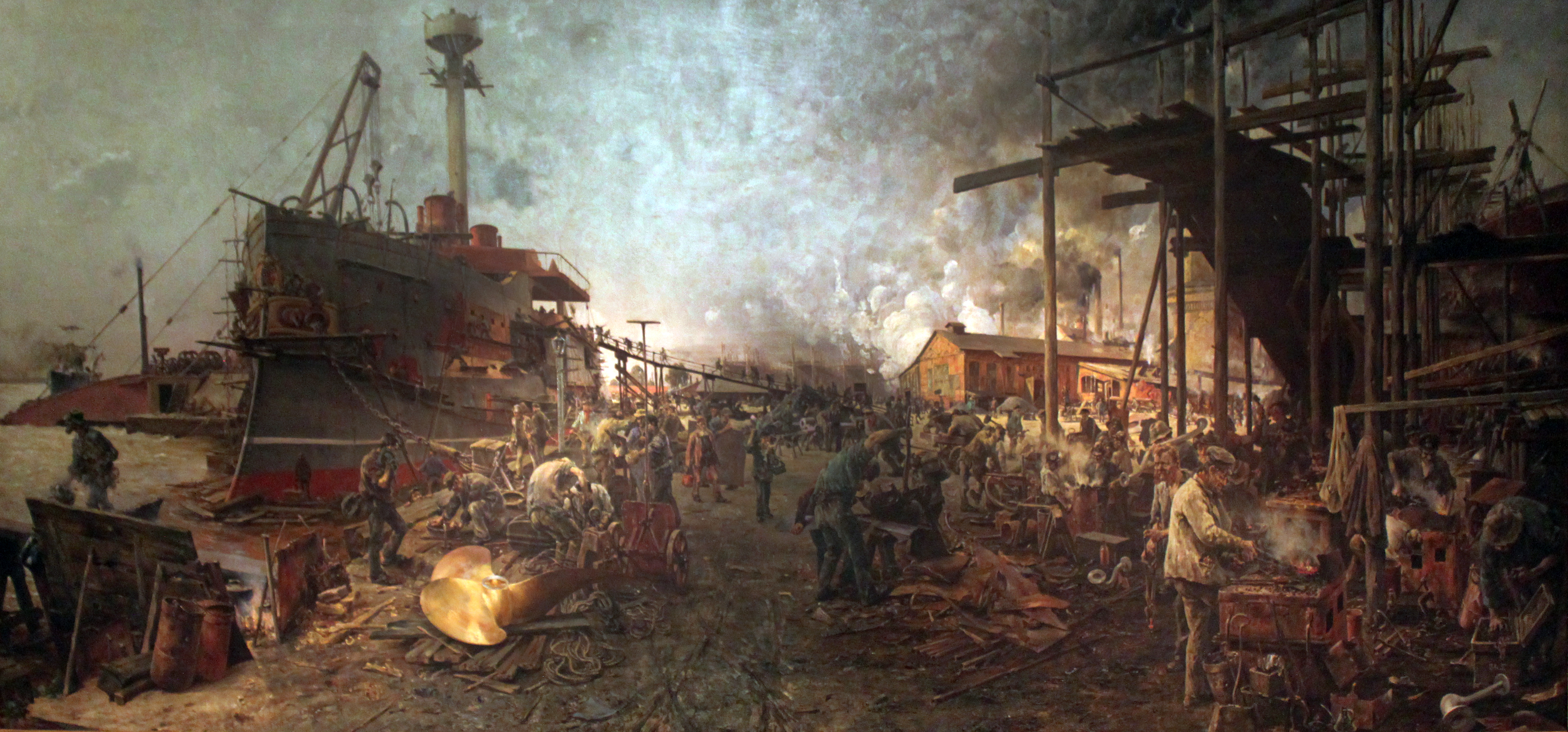
Carl Hochhaus: Construction of the Oldenburg at the Vulcan Shipyard, 1886, Deutsches Historisches Museum

Oldenburg was laid down in the spring of 1883 at the AG Vulcan shipyard in Stettin, under yard number 132, with the provisional designation "E". (Note: German warships were ordered under provisional names. Additions to the fleet were given a single letter; ships intended to replace older or lost vessels were ordered as "Ersatz (name of the ship to be replaced)".) She was launched on 20 December 1884, where the ship was christened by Friedrich August, who would go on to be the grand duke of Oldenburg, the ship's namesake. Fitting-out work thereafter commenced. She was completed by April 1886 and commissioned into the German Navy on 8 April, thereafter beginning sea trials under the command of Kapitän zur See (KzS—Captain at Sea) Heusner. Following their conclusion on 30 July, Oldenburg joined I Division of the fleet, alongside Sachsen, Bayern, and Württemberg, for the annual fleet maneuvers held in August and September. Bayern and Württemberg suffered from engine troubles throughout the exercises, but Oldenburg performed satisfactorily. After the end of the exercises in September, Oldenburg was assigned as the guard ship for Kiel, where she also conducted further sea trials under the command of Korvettenkapitän (KK——Corvette Captain) Max Plüddemann. On 23 December, she was decommissioned for the winter.

On 3 March 1887, Oldenburg was recommissioned to serve with the active squadron that year. In June, Germany began work on the Kaiser Wilhelm Canal; Oldenburg was among the ships present during the celebration marking the event. Oldenburg was assigned to the training squadron for the maneuvers in August–September 1887, along with König Wilhelm and Kaiser. The majority of the exercises were focused in the Baltic, but the fleet did conduct maneuvers in the North Sea for eight days in September. Oldenburg was decommissioned again for the winter on 21 October in Kiel. She remained out of service through 1888, and was recommissioned on 1 May 1889, under the command of KzS Ernst Aschmann. Oldenburg participated in the visit to Great Britain in August, where Wilhelm II took part in the Cowes Regatta. The ship was assigned to I Division with Sachsen, Baden, and the new cruiser Irene. Oldenburg and the rest of the fleet joined the Royal Navy in a fleet review for Queen Victoria. After returning to Germany, the ships took part in the fleet maneuvers. Oldenburg was assigned as a guard ship on 14 September; she was also used as a training ship for engine room crews.

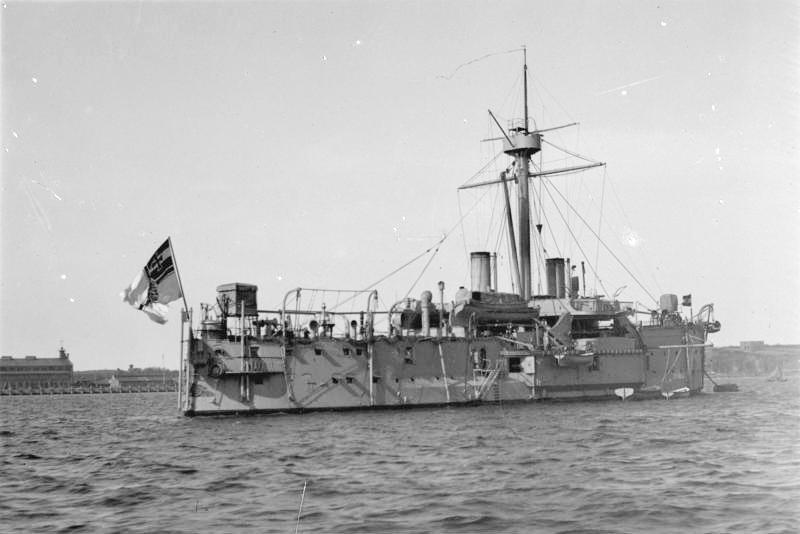
SMS Oldenburg in port

Oldenburg returned to active service with I Division in 1890. In June and July, she took part in Wilhelm II's state visit to Copenhagen, Denmark, and Christiana, Norway. After returning from the cruise in Scandinavian waters, Oldenburg and the rest of the division participated in the ceremonial transfer of the island of Helgoland from British to German control. She was present during the fleet maneuvers in September, where the entire eight-ship armored squadron simulated a Russian fleet blockading Kiel. Oldenburg thereafter went to Wilhelmshaven on the North Sea, where she resumed defense and training duties on 30 September.

=== 1891–1919 ===
She remained with I Division in 1891. In late February, she embarked Vizeadmiral (Vice Admiral) Max von der Goltz to Britain to witness the launchings of the new pre-dreadnought battleship HMS Royal Sovereign and the armored cruiser HMS Royal Arthur at the invitation of the British Admiralty. The visit lasted into early March, and while the ship was in Britain, a detachment of her crew was sent to participate in a military parade for Queen Victoria. Oldenburg rejoined I Division on 1 May, and the year's maneuvers simulated a two-front war against Russia and either France or Denmark. Oldenburg's deficiencies as a warship, particularly her insufficient radius of action, were highlighted during these exercises. Especially revealing was that she had to be towed back to port after she ran out of coal. That year, the German fleet was reorganized and a training squadron of ironclads was kept in commission through the winter, though Oldenburg was assigned to the Reserve Division of the North Sea, at that time coming under the command of KzS Alfred Herz. On 31 December, riots broke out among the ship's crew, which was quickly suppressed; the participants were subsequently tried in courts martial.

Oldenburg at anchor, date unknown

The ship was reactivated in early 1892 and reassigned to I Division to participate in the normal routine of training exercises and voyages abroad. These were interrupted on 14 July when the ship's engines broke down while she was cruising off Helgoland. After determining the extent of the damage, she was decommissioned on 6 August. As a result, Württemberg replaced Oldenburg in I Division, and the latter went into reserve for repairs. She remained out of service for the next five years, before being reactivated on 1 October 1897 to replace the old ironclad König Wilhelm in II Division of I Battle Squadron. On 1 December, she departed for the Mediterranean to join an international naval demonstration off the island of Crete, which Greece had sought to annex. On the way there, Oldenburg was forced to stop in Ferrol, Spain, to take on more coal, and she arrived Suda Bay, Crete, on 6 January 1898. There, she relieved the protected cruiser Kaiserin Augusta, which was in turn sent to join the East Asia Squadron. Oldenburg had been sent because there were no other warships available, despite her shortcomings. Her inadequacy was clear to the men of the other navies present, who nicknamed the ship "baby of war". She nevertheless contributed a landing party to an international force ashore. The ship remained in the demonstration until 16 March, when Germany and Austria-Hungary withdrew their naval contingents in a show of dissatisfaction over the compromise solution, which left Crete under Ottoman control, but with a Greek prince.

Oldenburg stopped in Messina, Italy, from 19 to 27 March before resuming the voyage home. The ship was interrupted again while in Málaga, Spain, by the outbreak of the Spanish–American War; she was ordered to remain in the area in the event that Germany's ambassador had need of the vessel. During this period, she carried envoys around Morocco, from Tangier to Mazagan and then to Marrakesh, where the envoy presented his credentials to the Moroccan government. Oldenburg remained in Cádiz, Spain, from mid-April to mid-May; during this period, the ship's executive officer, Kapitänleutnant (Captain Lieutenant) Günther von Krosigk, was sent as a liaison with the Spanish naval command. The ship later went to Lisbon, Portugal, for the celebration commemorating the 400th anniversary of the return of Vasco da Gama after his first voyage to India. She once again was a poor representation of Germany amongst the foreign vessels assembled for the event. Oldenburg then returned to Tanger, where she lay from late May to early July. She then received orders to return home, passing through Ferrol on 12 July, and arriving off Helgoland eight days later. The ship rejoined II Division of I Squadron and took part in the annual training cycle for the rest of the year.

On 22 March 1899, while steaming off Bülk in a heavy snow storm, Oldenburg ran aground and could not free herself, particularly after sand got into her condensers. The crew had to remove the ship's guns and ammunition before she could be pulled free. She was present for a celebration of the 50th anniversary of a battle during the First Schleswig War between German artillery batteries and Danish warships. Oldenburg was detached from I Squadron shortly thereafter, and on 23 April, she was decommissioned in Wilhelmshaven. From 1900, she was used as a guard ship and later as a depot ship, and she was towed to Kiel in early January 1904. She was stricken from the naval register on 13 January 1912. The vessel was used as a target ship by the High Seas Fleet and was accidentally grounded at Stollergrund in a storm in May 1913, where she continued to be used as a target until after the German defeat in World War I. Oldenburg was sold to Hattinger Company, a ship-breaking firm, on 5 May 1919. The ship was dismantled for scrap in Wilhelmshaven that year.
