= SMS Württemberg (1878) =

Armored corvette of the German Imperial Navy

- Lithograph of SMS Württemberg in 1902

History

German Empire
- Name: SMS Württemberg
- Builder: AG Vulcan in Stettin
- Laid down: November 1876
- Launched: 9 November 1878
- Commissioned: 9 May 1881
- Decommissioned: 10 November 1919
- Stricken: 20 October 1920
- Fate: Broken up, 1920

General characteristics
- Class & type: Sachsen-class ironclad
- Displacement: 7,677 t (7,556 long tons; 8,462 short tons)
- Length: 98.2 m (322 ft 2 in)
- Beam: 18.4 m (60 ft 4 in)
- Draft: 6.32 m (20 ft 9 in)
- Installed power: 8 × Dürr boilers; 5,600 ihp (4,200 kW)
- Propulsion: 2 × single-expansion steam engines; 2 × screw propellers
- Speed: 13 knots (24 km/h; 15 mph)
- Range: 1,940 nmi (3,590 km; 2,230 mi) at 10 knots (19 km/h; 12 mph)
- Complement: 32 officers; 285 enlisted men
- Armament: 6 × 26 cm (10.2 in)} L/22 guns; 6 × 8.7 cm (3.4 in) guns; 8 × 3.7 cm (1.5 in) guns
- Armor: Belt: 203–254 mm (8–10 in); Deck: 50–75 mm (2–3 in)

SMS Württemberg (Note: "SMS" stands for "Seiner Majestät Schiff", or "His Majesty's Ship".) was one of four Sachsen-class armored frigates of the German Kaiserliche Marine (Imperial Navy). Her sister ships were Sachsen, Bayern, and Baden. Württemberg was built in the AG Vulcan shipyard in Stettin from 1876 to 1881. The ship was commissioned into the Imperial Navy in August 1881. She was armed with a main battery of six 26 cm (10.2 in) guns in two open barbettes.

After her commissioning, Württemberg served with the fleet on numerous training exercises and cruises. She participated in several cruises escorting Kaiser Wilhelm II on state visits to Great Britain and to various cities in the Baltic Sea in the late 1880s and early 1890s. During 1898–1899, the ship was modernized at the Imperial Dockyard in Kiel; she served for another seven years with the fleet before being withdrawn from active service in 1906. She was subsequently used in a variety of secondary roles, until she was sold in 1920 and broken up for scrap.

== Design ==
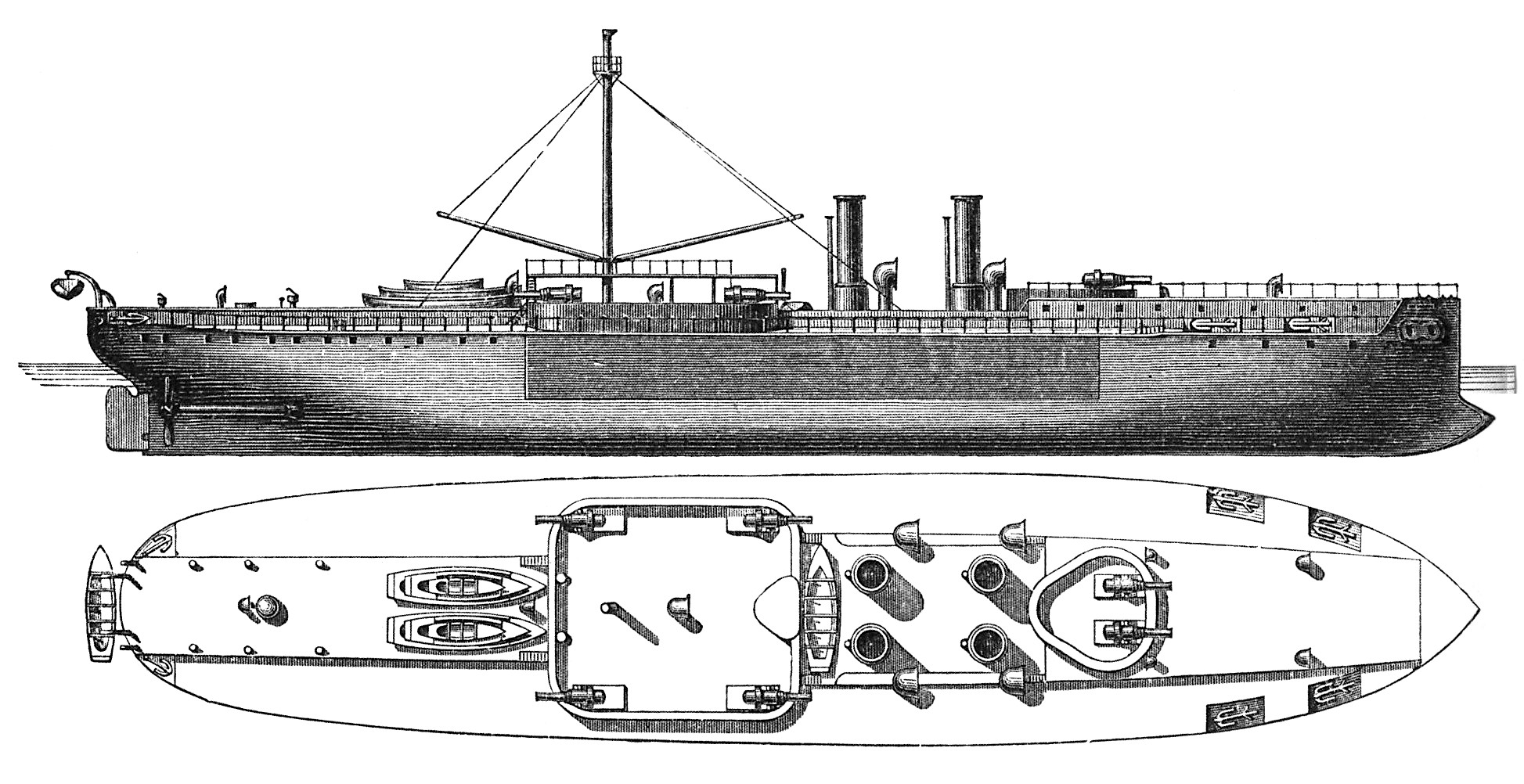
Plan and profile drawing of the Sachsen-class ships

The Sachsen class was the first group of capital ships built under the tenure of General Albrecht von Stosch, the first Chief of the Imperial Admiralty. Stosch favored a coastal defense strategy for the German fleet, and the Sachsens were intended to operate from fortified ports, from which they could sortie to attack blockading fleets. They proved to be controversial in service, as critics pointed out their poor seakeeping, tendency to roll in heavy seas, and low speed compared to earlier armored frigates. Along with her three sisters, Württemberg was the first large, armored warship built for the German navy that relied entirely on engines for propulsion.

The ship was 98.2 m (322 ft 2 in) long overall and had a beam of 18.4 m (60 ft 4 in) and a draft of 6.32 m (20 ft 9 in) forward. Württemberg was powered by two 3-cylinder single-expansion steam engines, which were supplied with steam by eight coal-fired Dürr boilers. The boilers were vented into four funnels in an unusual square arrangement. The ship's top speed was 13 knots (24 km/h; 15 mph), at 5,600 metric horsepower (5,500 ihp). Her standard complement consisted of 32 officers and 285 enlisted men, though while serving as a squadron flagship this was augmented by another 7 officers and 34 men.

She was armed with a main battery of six 26 cm (10.2 in) guns, two of which were single-mounted in an open barbette forward of the conning tower and the remaining four mounted amidships, also on single mounts in an open barbette. As built, the ship was also equipped with six 8.7 cm (3.4 in) L/24 guns and eight 3.7 cm (1.5 in) Hotchkiss revolver cannons for defense against torpedo boats.

Württemberg's armor was made of wrought iron, and was concentrated in an armored citadel amidships. The armor ranged from 203 to 254 mm (8 to 10 in) on the armored citadel, and between 50–75 mm (2–3 in) on the deck. The barbette armor was 254 mm of wrought iron backed by 250 mm of teak.

=== Modifications ===
Between 1896 and 1898, Württemberg was extensively modernized to prolong her useful service life. The ship's old wrought iron and teak armor was replaced with new Krupp nickel-steel armor. The four funnels were trunked into a single large funnel and new engines were also installed, which increased the ship's speed to 15.4 knots (28.5 km/h; 17.7 mph). The ship's 8.7 cm guns were replaced with quick-firing 8.8 cm (3.5 in) SK L/30 guns and four 3.7 cm (1.5 in) autocannons. Work was completed in 1898.

== Service history ==
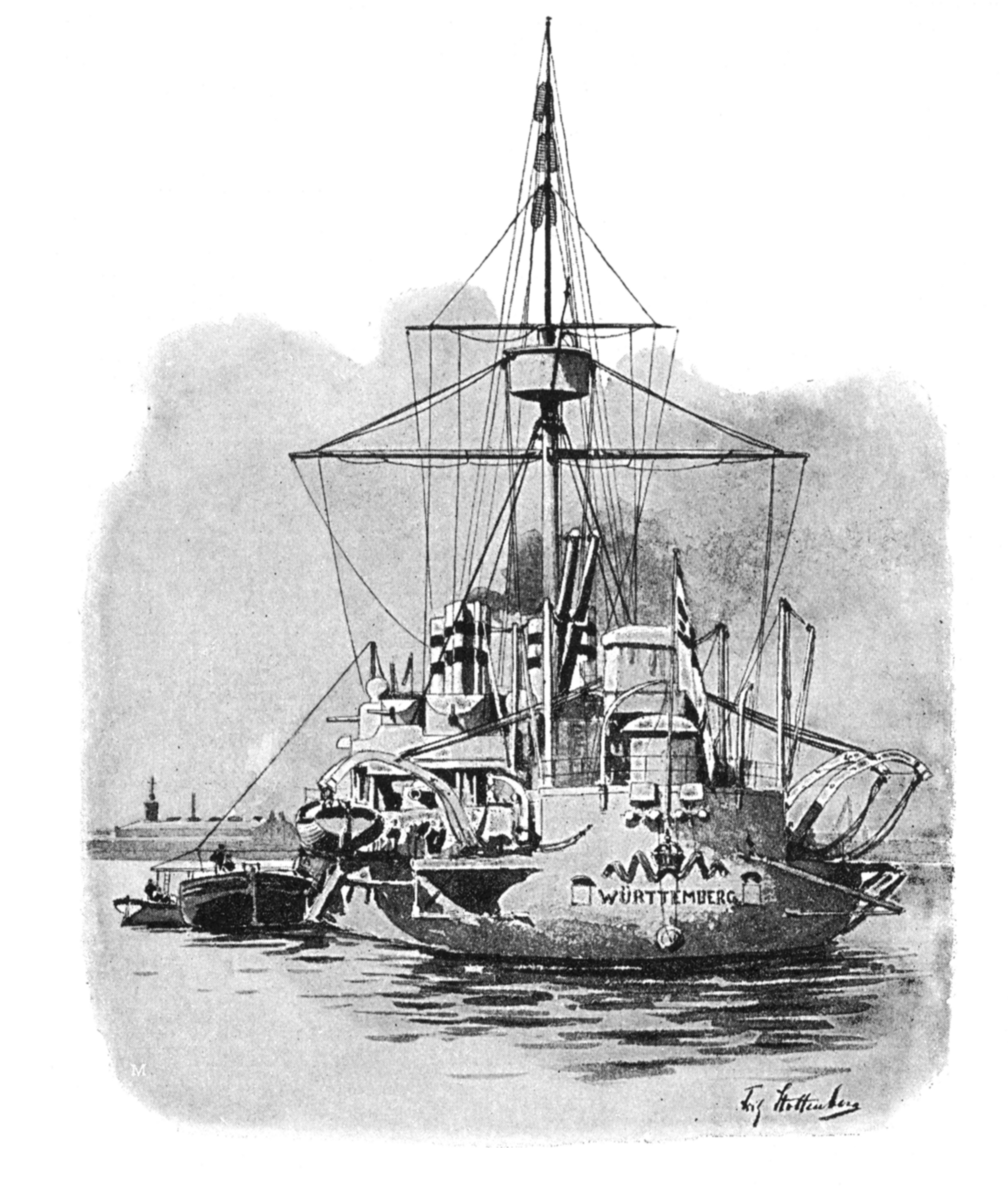
Sketch of Württemberg seen from the stern

=== Construction ===
Württemberg was ordered by the Imperial Navy under the contract name "D," which denoted that the vessel was a new addition to the fleet. (Note: German warships were ordered under provisional names. Additions to the fleet were given a single letter; ships intended to replace older or lost vessels were ordered as "Ersatz (name of the ship to be replaced)".) She was built at the AG Vulcan shipyard in Stettin; her keel was laid down in November 1876 under yard number 78. The ship was launched on 9 November 1878 and most work was completed by April 1881; at that time, she was transferred to the Kaiserliche Werft (Imperial Shipyard) in Kiel for final fitting out. But low water levels in the Oder river made the voyage from Stettin to the Baltic Sea difficult, and on 24 April she ran aground in the river and was stranded for two days. The ship was eventually refloated and was not damaged in the accident. She was temporarily commissioned into the German fleet on 9 May 1881. At the time, representatives from Qing China were in Germany to observe the beginning of construction of their new ironclad Dingyuan, and during a visit to Kiel, they came aboard Württemberg to inspect the ship. (Note: The Chinese ironclad Dingyuan was built to a modified Sachsen-class design, the chief difference being the arrangement of the main battery in two twin gun turrets, rather than the open barbette battery of the Sachsens.)

On 16 May, Württemberg was decommissioned to undergo fitting out, which included the installation of her main battery. Work was completed in a few weeks, and in June, the ship began sea trials without being recommissioned. These tests were carried out under the supervision of the shipyard director, Kapitän zur See (KzS—Captain at Sea) Max von der Goltz. After completing her trials, the ship was placed in reserve until April 1884. The official reason was to await the completion of her sister ships, but the naval historian Lawrence Sondhaus states that the delay in active use in part had to do with the poor performance of her sister Sachsen in the fleet maneuvers of 1880. Among the problems associated with the Sachsen-class ships was a tendency to roll dangerously due to their flat bottoms, which greatly reduced the accuracy of their guns. The ships were also poorly armored, compared to their contemporaries. In addition, they were slow and suffered from poor maneuverability.

=== 1884–1896 ===
Württemberg was recommissioned on 22 April 1884, for her first major period of active service. At that time, KzS Hans von Koester served as her first commander. She and her three sisters served as I Division in the 1884 fleet maneuvers, under the command of Konteradmiral (KAdm—Rear Admiral) Alexander von Monts. On 3 September, the ship came to the assistance of the damaged screw corvette SMS Sophie, which had been seriously damaged in a collision with the Norddeutscher Lloyd steamer SS Hohenstaufen Württemberg took Sophie under tow and took her back to port for repairs. Following the end of the annual fleet maneuvers in September, Württemberg was reduced to the reserve for the winter on 30 September and Koester left the ship. The ship was again placed in reserve in 1885, and on 15 November she was allocated to the Reserve Division, but returned to fleet service in 1886 alongside Sachsen, Baden, and the new ironclad Oldenburg. KzS Friedrich von Hollmann commanded the ship during the year's training activities. During the annual fleet maneuvers, Württemberg's engines proved troublesome.

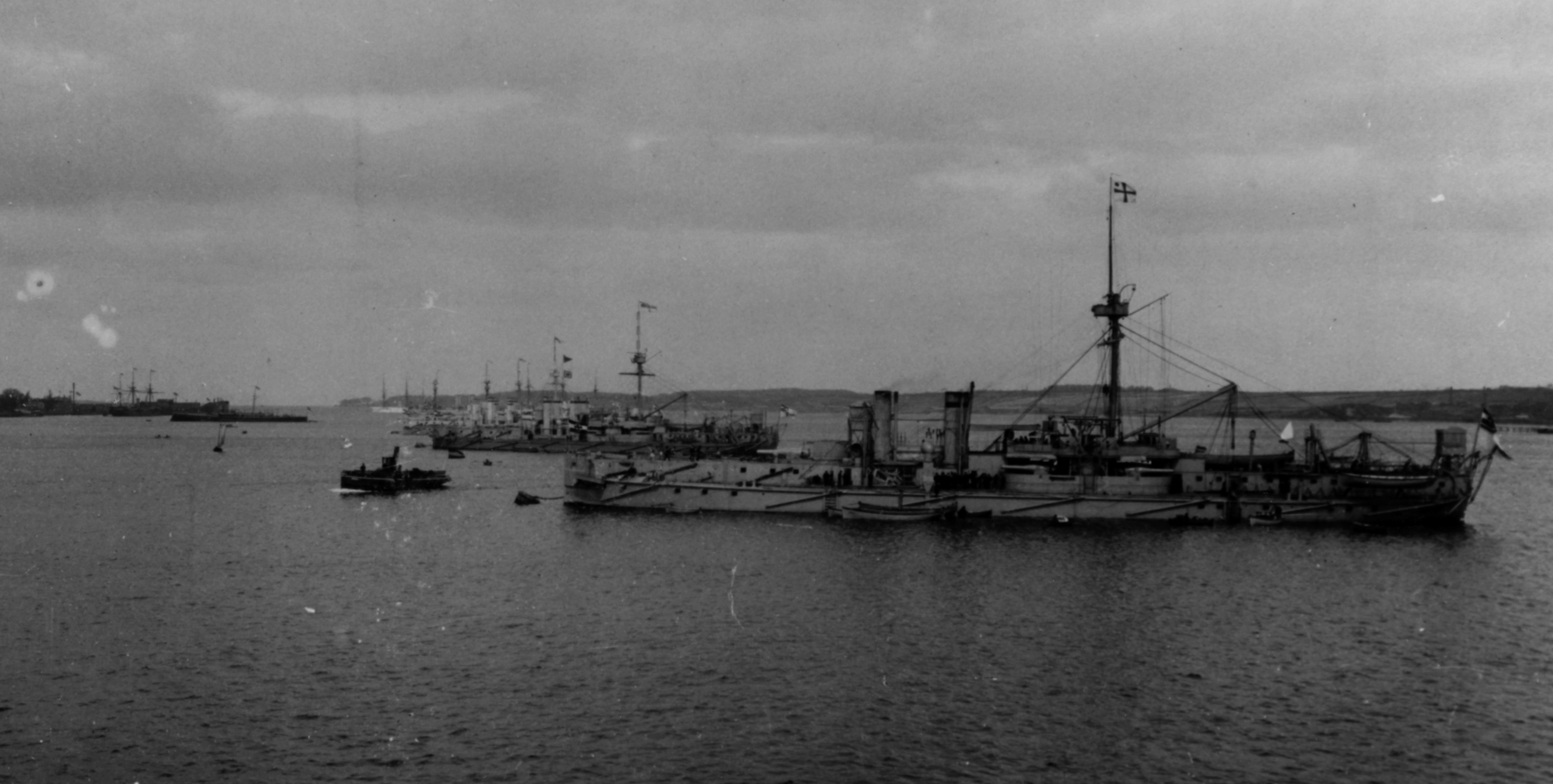
The German fleet at anchor in 1896; the four Sachsen-class ironclads are at right

Following the 1886 maneuvers, Württemberg and her three sisters were removed from active duty to serve as the Reserve Division of the Baltic Sea. In June 1887, Germany dedicated the Kaiser Wilhelm Canal; Württemberg was among the ships present during the celebrations. She remained in the Reserve Division in 1888, and in May replaced Baden as the active vessel in the unit. When the ship returned to active service on 28 May, her next captain, KzS Franz von Kyckbusch, came aboard. She also served as the guard ship for Kiel that summer, until 21 September, when she was again deactivated and Kyckbusch left the vessel. On 1 October, the German reserve fleet was reorganized, and Württemberg was assigned to II Reserve Division.

The ship returned to active service with the fleet on 2 May 1890, under the command of KzS Alfred von Tirpitz, when she joined I Division during the annual maneuvers. The eight ships of I and II Divisions simulated a Russian fleet blockading Kiel, which was defended by torpedo boat flotillas. On 30 September, Tirpitz departed the ship. Württemberg was in reserve during the 1891 maneuvers, but returned to I Division in 1892. She was recommissioned on 8 August that year under the command of KzS Alfred Herz in preparation for the autumn maneuvers to replace Oldenburg, which had to be withdrawn from the maneuvers due to engine problems. During the latter part of the maneuvers, Württemberg accidentally collided with the old armored frigate Friedrich Carl off Stolpmünde. Württemberg's steering gear was disabled in the collision and the central battery ironclad Deutschland had to take her under tow back to Kiel for repairs. In November, Korvettenkapitän (KK—Corvette Captain) Max von Fischel took command of the ship.

Württemberg remained in I Division through 1894, and these years passed uneventfully for the ship beyond the normal routine of peacetime training activities. KzS Curt von Maltzan replaced Fischel in October 1893. By the winter of 1894–1895, the last of the four Brandenburg-class battleships had been commissioned; these ships were assigned to I Division, which displaced Württemberg and her three sisters to II Division. The eight ships conducted training cruises over the winter and spring before conducting the annual autumn fleet exercises. On 21 June 1895, the Kaiser Wilhelm Canal was opened for traffic, eight years after work had begun. Württemberg and her three sisters, along with dozens of other warships, attended the ceremonies. The major naval powers sent fleets to join the fleet review. The autumn 1895 maneuvers simulated a high-seas battle between I and II Divisions in the North Sea, followed by combined maneuvers with the rest of the fleet in the Baltic. Maltzahn left Württemberg in September, and the following month KzS Karl Ascher replaced him. On 24 October, the ship ran aground in the Great Belt, but she was able to be pulled free without damage.

From 9 December 1895 to 10 March 1896, Württemberg temporarily served as the flagship of I Squadron for now-Vizeadmiral (VAdm—Vice Admiral) Koester, while his normal flagship was in drydock for periodic maintenance. The ship took part in the 1896 and 1897 maneuvers, though Sachsen was her only sister to join the exercises. Baden and Bayern were out of service for extensive modernization. By that time, the fleet had been reorganized and the ships were part of I Squadron. Württemberg had two more brief stints as temporary fleet flagship in 1897, the first from 4 October to 2 November, and the second from 17 to 26 December. During these periods, VAdm August von Thomsen commanded the squadron. At the same time, from 30 November to 16 December, Württemberg also served as the flagship for II Division under KAdm Felix von Bendemann. On 6 December, the ship suffered an accident that caused her to be decommissioned for repairs on 15 January 1898, somewhat earlier than had been planned.

=== Reconstruction and later career ===
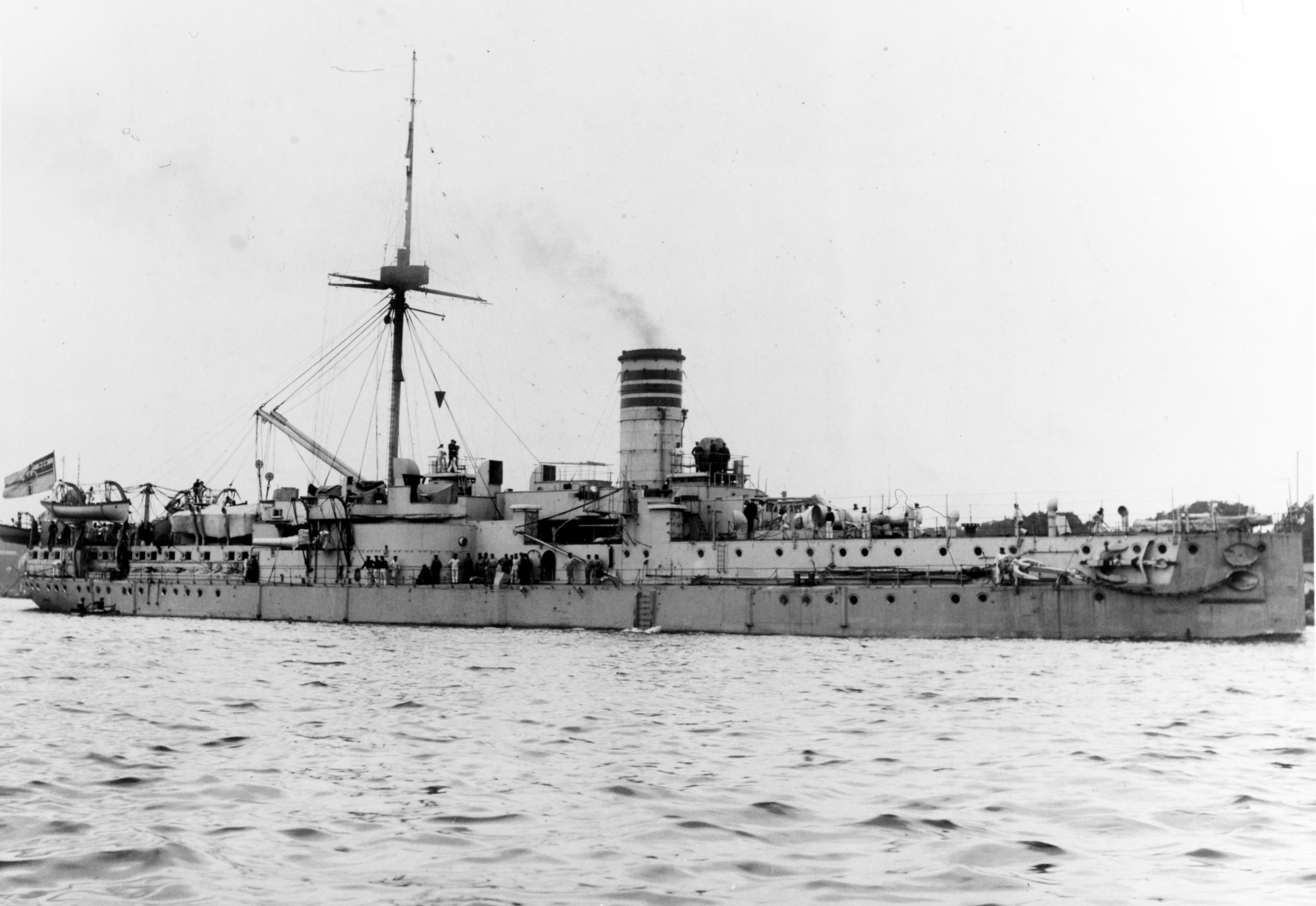
SMS Württemberg in 1899, after reconstruction

After being decommissioned in early 1898, Württemberg was taken into drydock at the Kaiserliche Werft in Kiel for an extensive reconstruction that significantly altered her appearance. The work lasted more than a year and a half, and she was finally recommissioned on 8 October 1899 under the command of KzS Hugo Westphal. She conducted sea trials until 29 October, when she was returned to II Division of I Squadron. On 14 December, she became the flagship of the divisional commander, KAdm Wilhelm Büchsel, who was also the deputy squadron commander. She held the role until 24 January 1900. In July, the four Brandenburg-class battleships were sent to China as the Detached Division in response to the Boxer Uprising; as a result, Württemberg and the rest of II Division were transferred to I Division, though the new battleship Kaiser Wilhelm II became the squadron flagship. From 15 to 21 September, during the autumn maneuvers, Württemberg briefly resumed her role as divisional flagship. On 1 October, the Reserve Division of the North Sea was established, and the ships of I Division were assigned to it. At that time, KzS Eduard Holzhauer relieved Westphal as the ship's captain. Württemberg and Baden were kept in commission as active ships during this period.

Württemberg again served with I Squadron for the first half of 1901, taking part in all of the unit training exercises and cruises through July, when the Detached Division returned from East Asia. During this period, in March, KzS Carl Friedrich took command of the ship. On 25 July, Württemberg and the rest of the squadron went to sea for a cruise to Norway, including a visit to Ulvik that lasted until 31 July. On the voyage back to Germany, the Detached Division met the fleet, which was reorganized for the autumn maneuvers. The Detached Division retook its place as I Squadron, and Württemberg and the rest of her unit became II Squadron for the exercises. Following the maneuvers, Württemberg resumed her role in the Reserve Division of the North Sea, based in Wilhelmshaven. Fregattenkapitän (FK—Frigate Captain) Otto Hoepner replaced Friedrich in September. The training cycles for 1902 and 1903 passed uneventfully for Württemberg, interrupted only by another cruise to Norway in May and June 1903. During this period, the ship was commanded by KzS Carl Schönfelder. The fleet maneuvers that year were longer than normal, beginning on 4 July and lasting until 12 September. In both years, Württemberg served in II Squadron. On 29 September 1903, Württemberg was decommissioned and reduced to the reserve. She was transferred to the Baltic Sea on 2 January 1904, as the Reserve Division of the North Sea was disbanded at that time, and she remained there until 1906.

In 1906, Württemberg was selected to replace the old corvette Blücher as the fleet's torpedo training ship. Conversion work was carried out aboard Württemberg that year, which included removing her main battery guns and converting the empty barbettes into classrooms and additional living spaces for trainees. Blücher was decommissioned on 25 September and her crew was transferred to Württemberg, which was recommissioned the following day, under the command of KzS Fritz Sommerwerck. After carrying out sea trials, she departed for the new Torpedo School in Flensburg-Mürwik on 14 October. There, Blücher served as a support hulk for Württemberg, and several torpedo boats were assigned to support training operations. Later, Uranus replaced Blücher as the support hulk. Württemberg first went to sea with the Unit of Training and Experimental Ships in April 1907 to take part in training exercises in the central Baltic. The unit, which was later renamed the Training Squadron, also included the armored cruisers Prinz Adalbert and Friedrich Carl and the protected cruiser Vineta. In October, KzS Johannes Nickel relieved Sommerwerck, serving as the ship's captain for the next two years. For the fleet maneuvers of August and September 1909, Württemberg was assigned to the Reserve Squadron, after which KzS Felix Funke replaced Nickel. Funke was to command the ship for the following three years. After conducting shooting practice on 10 December, she ran aground in the Flensburg Firth off Holnis. After three days, the battleship Schwaben pulled Württemberg free; because she had been grounded on a sand bar, she was not damaged in the incident and she was able to continue her normal training activities.

The years 1910 and 1911 passed largely uneventfully for the ship. The ship remained on the list of battleships until 28 March 1911. In February 1912, she was used as an emergency ice breaker to assist merchant vessels in the Baltic during an unusually cold winter. She assisted four vessels that were trapped in the sea ice that winter. She did not take part in the autumn maneuvers in 1912 or 1913, and in October 1912, KzS Georg von Ammon replaced Funke as the ship's commander. While on participating in training exercises off Swinemünde on 11 April 1913, a snow storm forced Württemberg to try to seek shelter in Möwe Bay. While attempting to drop anchors, she drifted into shallow water and grounded once again. She was unable to free herself and had to be assisted by other vessels, but she nevertheless emerged undamaged. The navy planned to decommission Württemberg in the autumn of 1914, and her place was to be taken by the armored cruiser Fürst Bismarck, but the outbreak of World War I interrupted the plan. Instead, the ship became the flagship of the fleet's support ships, under FK Reinhold Schmidt. In early 1915, it became apparent that the war would not be over quickly and the fleet would need to resume training activities for new crewmen, so Württemberg reverted to training duties for the remainder of her career under the imperial flag. KzS Wilhelm Adelung commanded the ship from April 1915 to February 1917.

Following Germany's defeat in late 1918, Württemberg was decommissioned on 1 February 1919. She was thereafter used as a barracks ship and tender to support the F-type minesweepers of the 6th Minesweeper Half-Flotilla of the III Minesweeper Flotilla, stationed in the Baltic. The ship was decommissioned for the last time on 10 November 1919 and was stricken from the naval register on 20 October 1920, before being sold to Hattinger Co. Württemberg was ultimately broken up for scrap in Wilhelmshaven.
