= Sachsen-class ironclad =

Armored corvette class of the German Imperial Navy

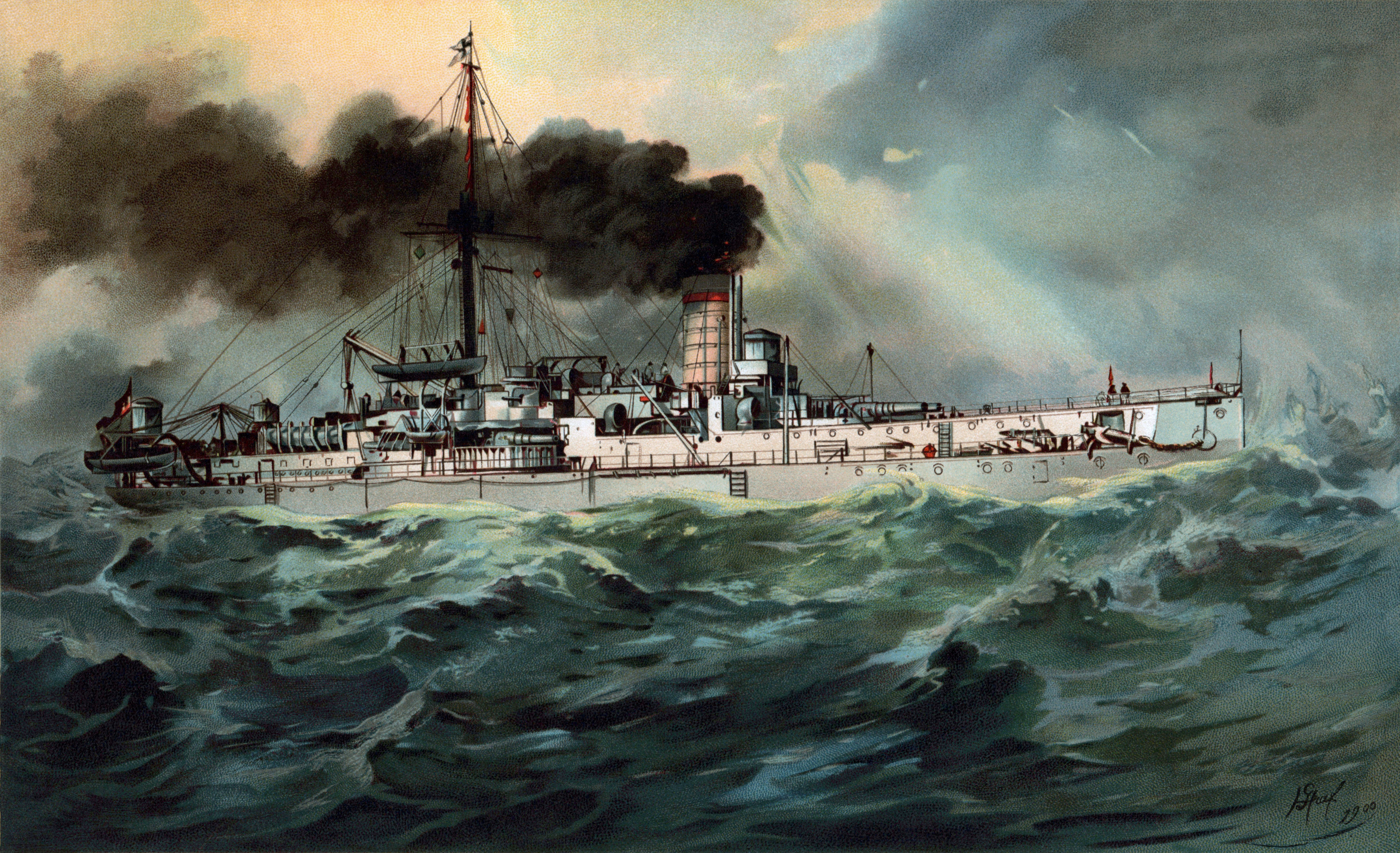
- A 1902 lithograph of SMS Baden

Class overview
- Builders: AG Vulcan Stettin; Kaiserliche Werft Kiel
- Operators: Imperial German Navy
- Preceded by: Kaiser class
- Succeeded by: SMS Oldenburg
- Built: 1875–1883
- In commission: 1878–1910
- Completed: 4
- Retired: 4

General characteristics
- Type: Armored corvette
- Displacement: 7,635 t (7,514 long tons)
- Length: 98.2 m (322 ft 2 in)
- Beam: 18.4 m (60 ft 4 in)
- Draft: 6.32 m (20 ft 9 in)
- Installed power: 8 × boilers; 5,600 ihp (4,200 kW)
- Propulsion: 2 × single-expansion steam engines; 2 × screw propellers
- Speed: 13 knots (24 km/h; 15 mph)
- Range: 1,940 nmi (3,590 km; 2,230 mi) at 10 knots (19 km/h; 12 mph)
- Complement: 32 officers; 285 enlisted men
- Armament: 6 × 26 cm (10.2 in) L/22 guns; 6 × 8.7 cm (3.4 in) guns; 8 × 3.7 cm (1.5 in) guns
- Armor: Belt: 203–254 mm (8–10 in); Deck: 50–75 mm (2–3 in)

The Sachsen class of armored corvettes was a class of four ships built by the Imperial German Navy in the late 1870s to early 1880s. The ships—Sachsen, Bayern, Württemberg, and Baden—were designed to operate as part of an integrated coastal defense network. The ships were intended to sortie from fortified bases to break up an enemy blockade or landing attempt. Armed with six 26 cm (10.2 in) guns, they were also intended to fight hostile ironclads on relatively equal terms.

Following their commissionings in 1878–1883, the four ships served with the fleet on numerous training exercises and cruises in the 1880s and 1890s. They also participated in several cruises escorting Kaiser Wilhelm II on state visits to Great Britain and to various cities in the Baltic Sea in the late 1880s and early 1890s. In the late 1890s, the four ships were extensively rebuilt; their secondary batteries were modernized and they received upgraded propulsion systems. They were removed from active duty between 1902 and 1910 and relegated to secondary duties. Sachsen and Bayern became target ships while Württemberg became a torpedo training ship. The three ships were broken up for scrap in 1919–1920. Baden was used as a boom defense hulk from 1910 to 1920, when she became a target ship. She survived until 1938, when she was sold for scrapping.

== Background ==
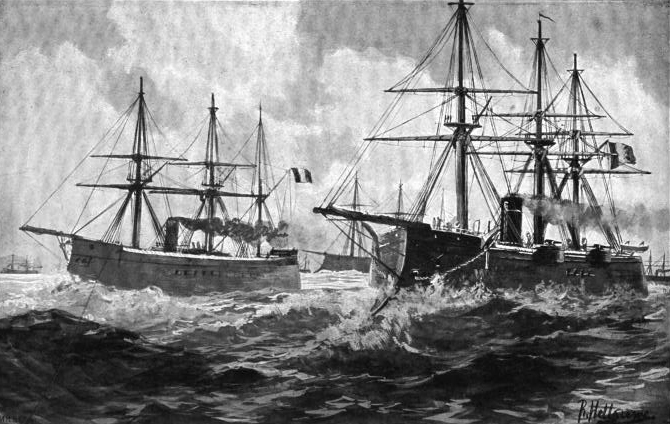
French ironclads on the blockade of Prussia's coast

The origin of the Sachsen class of ironclad corvettes traces back to the fleet plan of 1861 approved for the Prussian Navy. The plan called for the construction of four small ironclads that had a shallow-enough draft to allow them to operate in the Baltic Sea, where larger armored frigates would be unable to maneuver. These ships were never built, owing to a combination of budgetary limitations, technical inexperience in Prussian shipyards, and other factors. But the blockade the Danish Navy had imposed during the Second Schleswig War of 1864 and the operations of the French fleet during the Franco-Prussian War of 1870–1871 made clear the vulnerability of the long Baltic coastline to enemy attacks. After the Franco-Prussian war, General Albrecht von Stosch became the Chief of the Imperial Admiralty; he immediately set about drafting a new fleet plan, based on the most recent program that had been approved in 1867.

Stosch saw the role of the navy as primarily defensive; a fleet of ironclad warships would be kept in German waters to defend the coast. Stosch's fleet plan, finalized in 1873, called for a total of eight ocean-going ironclads and six smaller, armored corvettes. The quota for sea-going vessels was met by the Kaiser class, while only one armored corvette had been laid down by that point: SMS Hansa. The new corvettes were to be the first vessels built under the Imperial government.

The new ships were intended to operate in the Baltic Sea as a primary component of an integrated coastal defense system proposed by Stosch. He designated the ships Ausfallkorvetten (sortie corvettes), denoting their intended use. In the event of war with a superior naval power and the imposition of a naval blockade, the Sachsen-class ships would sortie from fortified bases to attack the blockaders. They also had the task of breaking up landing attempts. The German railway network linked the bases so ground forces could be transferred to the sites of enemy landings. Stosch envisioned using the smaller Wespe class of armored gunboats to support them, though these proved to be disappointments in service.

== Design ==
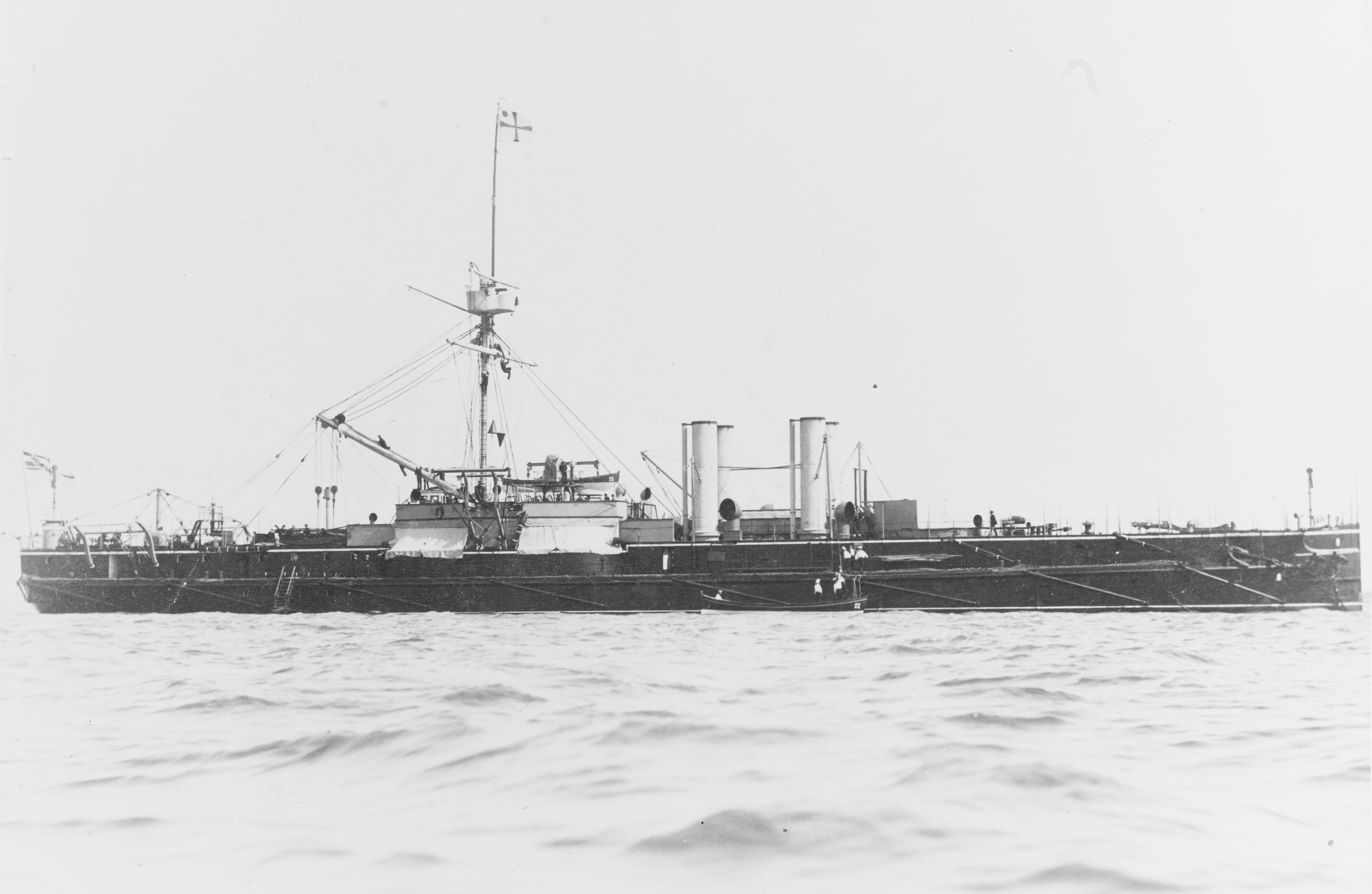
Baden early in her career

Stosch had instructed the design staff to begin work on the next corvette already in 1872, before they had been authorized under the 1873 fleet plan. Work on what became the Sachsen class continued into 1874. Their roles imposed several design limitations on the vessels. The vessels were designed to operate in coastal areas, which required a shallow draft in order for them to be able to enter any port on the Baltic seaboard. They also required a heavy armament and think armor plate, in order for them to be able to engage any hostile ironclad on equal terms. Because Stosch envisioned only local deployments for the vessels, they did not need a high top speed or a long cruising radius. As a result, they had limited coal stowage, as they would operate close to their bases and could easily replenish fuel. A supplemental sailing rig was rejected for the same reason. Initially, 30.5 cm (12 in) guns were considered, but the design staff decided to use lighter 26 cm (10 in) guns instead. The designers adopted the basic format of the British breastwork monitors, but rather than employing the heavy gun turrets used in those vessels, the Germans opted for lighter open barbette mountings.

The ships were poorly received once they entered active service. This was in large part because they had been designed for a specialized purpose, rather than as a balanced warship. The dissatisfaction with the Sachsens further damaged Stosch's reputation in the navy; Stosch, who was an army officer, was derisively referred to a "Land Admiral". Blame for the ships' design was unfairly attributed to Stosch, however, as he had recognized that he lacked the necessary technical expertise and deferred to advice from senior naval commanders. There was considerable disagreement in the naval command structure, in part owing to the transition from wooden-hulled sailing ships to iron-hulled steamships.

They nevertheless introduced two developments to the German fleet: they were the first German capital ships built with a two-propeller arrangement and the first without a sailing rig. They also formed the homogeneous core of the German fleet for many years, until the arrival of the Brandenburg-class pre-dreadnought battleships in the 1890s. In the early 1880s, AG Vulcan, which built Sachsen and Württemberg, contracted with the government of Qing China to build the two Dingyuan-class ironclads to a modified Sachsen design. The primary difference between the German and Chinese vessels was the arrangement of the main battery: the Germans had adopted an open barbette mounting for their guns, while the Chinese opted for revolving gun turrets for theirs.

=== General characteristics and machinery ===
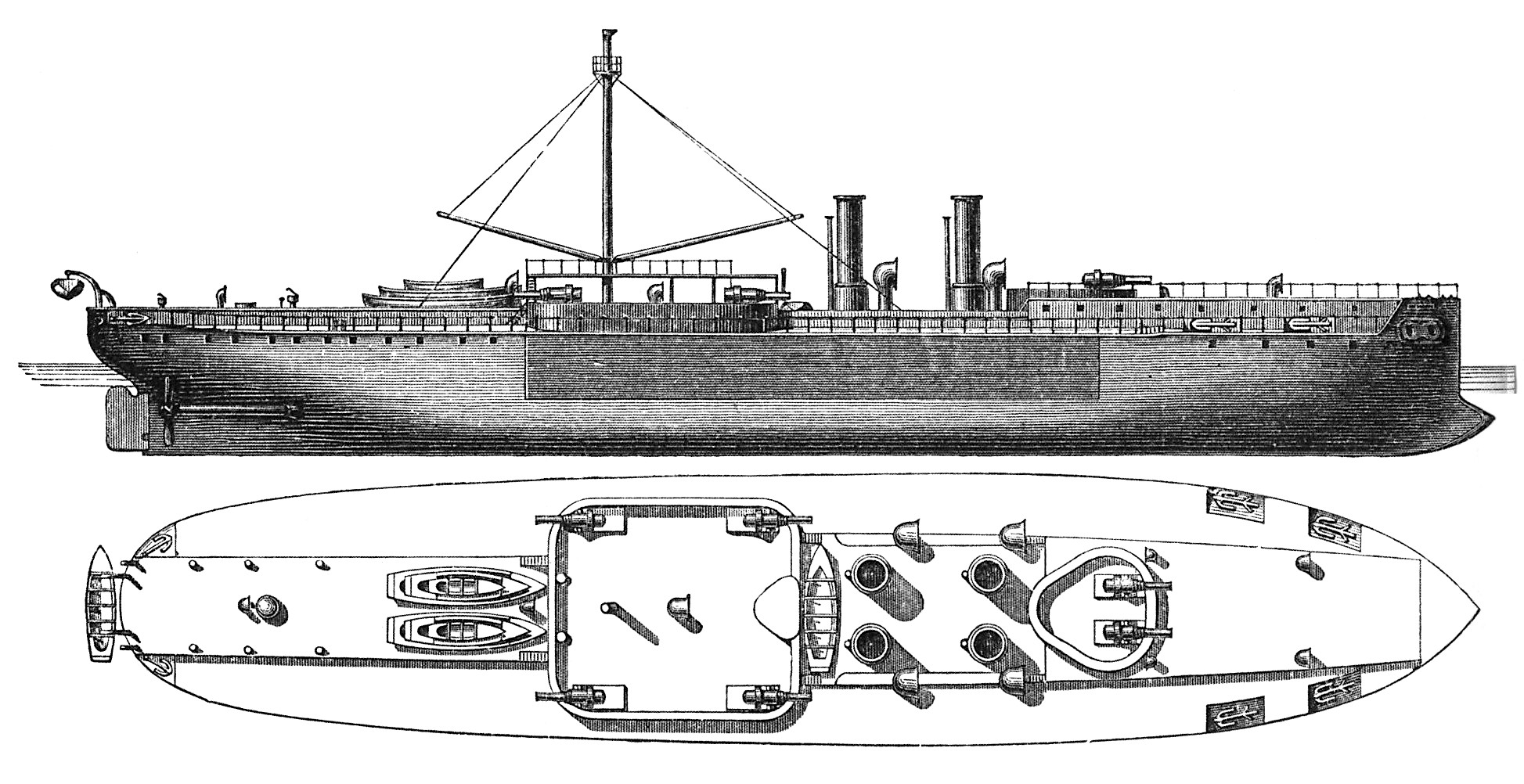
Plan and profile drawing of the Sachsen-class ships

The ships of the Sachsen class were 98.2 m (322 ft 2 in) long overall. They had a beam of 18.4 m (60 ft 4 in) and a draft of 6.32 m (20 ft 9 in) forward and 6.53 m (21 ft 5 in) aft. At the designed displacement, the vessels displaced 7,635 metric tons (7,514 long tons). When the vessels were fully loaded, they displaced between 7,742 t (7,620 long tons) and 7,938 t (7,813 long tons). Their hulls were built with transverse bulkheads and double longitudinal iron frames; iron plating covered teak backing. The ships had sixteen watertight compartments and a double bottom that ran for 60 percent of the length of the hull. The Sachsen class was the first major warship of the fleet to adopt internal subdivision.

The German navy regarded the ships as poor sea boats, with severe rolling, and a tendency to take on water. Steering by alternating engine speeds only worked while steaming in reverse. The ships had a very small turning radius, however, and were quick to answer commands from the helm. Their standard complement consisted of 32 officers and 285 enlisted men, and while serving as a division flagship, this could be augmented by an additional seven officers and thirty-four sailors. After their reconstruction in the 1890s, the ships' crews were significantly increased, to 33 officers and 344 enlisted men, and later to 35 officers and 401 enlisted men. The ships carried a number of smaller boats, including one picket boat, one launch, one pinnace, two cutters, one yawl, and one dinghy.

The four ships were powered by two 3-cylinder single-expansion steam engines. The ships' engines drove a pair of four-bladed screws that were 5 m (16 ft 5 in) in diameter. Each engine was placed in its own engine room. The engines were supplied with steam by eight coal-fired trunk boilers. The eight boilers were vented into four funnels arranged in a square amidships. This unusual arrangement led to the ships being nicknamed Zementfabriken (cement factories). All four ships' propulsion systems were manufactured by Märkisch-Schlesische Maschinenbau und Hütten and AG Germania. Three generators provided 69 kilowatts of electrical power at 65 volts.

The ships' designed speed was 13 knots (24 km/h; 15 mph), at 5,600 metric horsepower (5,500 ihp). All four ships exceeded this speed on trials by between one half to one knot. The ships were designed to store 420 t (410 long tons) of coal, though they could be modified to carry up to 700 t (690 long tons). The ships could steam for 1,940 nautical miles (3,590 km; 2,230 mi) at a cruising speed of 10 knots (19 km/h; 12 mph). At maximum speed, the ships' ranges were reduced to 700 nmi (1,300 km; 810 mi). The four Sachsen-class ships were the first large, armored warships built for the German navy that relied entirely on engines for propulsion.

=== Armament and armor ===
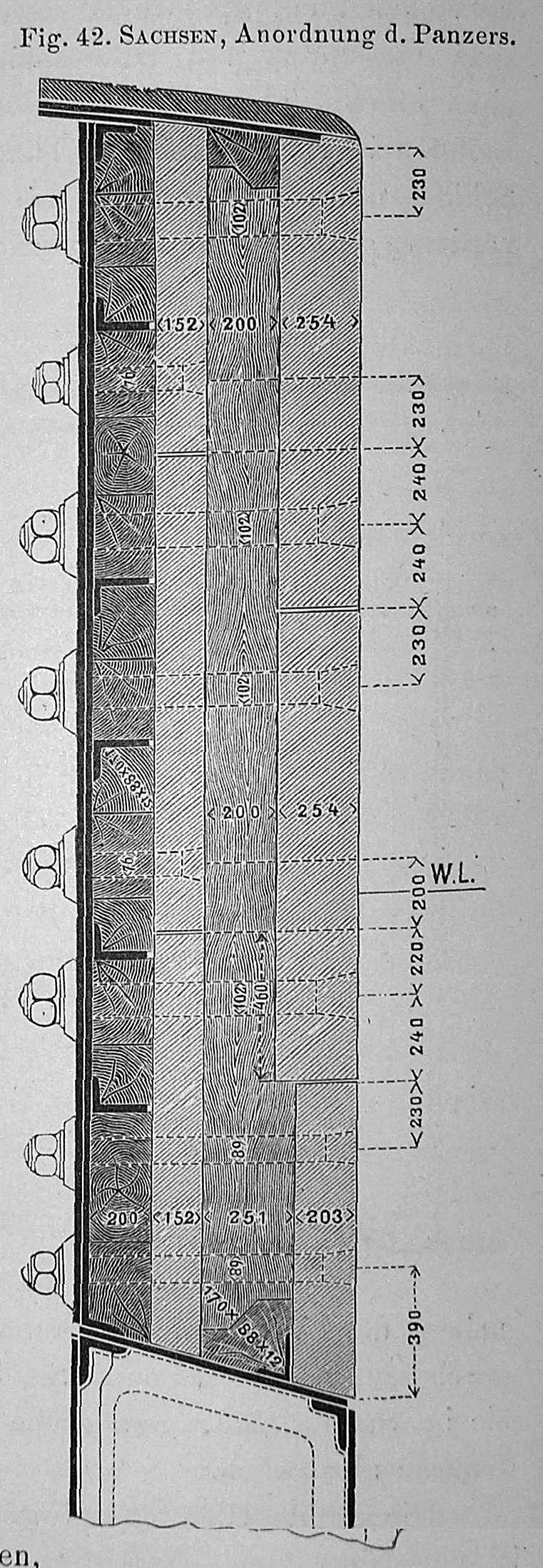
Diagram showing the layering of the ships' armor

The Sachsen-class ships were armed with a main battery of six 26 cm (10.2 in) L/22 guns mounted in two armored barbettes, one forward and one amidships. Two guns were placed in the forward barbette and four were mounted in the amidships position. These guns were supplied with 480 rounds of ammunition. They could depress to −7° and elevate to 16.5°; this enabled a maximum range of 7,400 m (8,100 yd). The barbette arrangement would have theoretically provided a total of four guns firing forward during a ramming attack, but the blast damage from the ships' own guns proved to be too serious to permit this in practice. For defense against torpedo boat attacks, the ships were also equipped with six 8.7 cm (3.4 in) L/24 guns and eight 3.7 cm (1.5 in) Hotchkiss revolver cannons.

The ships' iron armor was made of wrought iron and backed with teak. The armor belt was composed of four alternating layers of wrought iron and teak. The outer iron layer was 203 mm (8 in) thick amidships, backed with 200 mm (7.9 in) of teak. The inner iron layer was 152 mm (6 in) thick and was backed with 230 mm (9.1 in) of teak. It was capped with 254 mm (10 in) thick bulkheads on either end of the belt. German industry initially lacked the capability to produce iron armor in the necessary thickness, so iron plate from Camel & Company of Sheffield, Britain, was purchased for the first two members of the class. By the time work began on the latter pair of vessels, the German firm Dillinger Hütte was capable of producing the required plates, allowing Stosch to buy domestically produced armor.

The thickness of the deck armor ranged from 50 to 75 mm (2 to 3 in). The forward conning tower had 140 mm (5.5 in) thick sides, though after their modernization, this was increased to 200 mm (7.9 in) thick sides and a 50 mm (2 in) roof was added. A rear conning tower was also added, with only splinter protection: 15 mm (0.59 in) thick sides and a 12 mm (0.47 in) thick roof. The barbettes for the main battery guns had 254 mm of wrought iron backed with 250 mm of teak.

=== Modifications ===
After 1886, three 35 cm (14 in) torpedo tubes were installed on each ship; one tube was placed in a swivel mount in the stern and two were placed in the bow, submerged. The tubes were supplied with a total of twelve torpedoes. Later, a pair of 45 cm (18 in) torpedo tubes were mounted in the ships' hulls above the water on the broadside.

The ships were more heavily rebuilt in the late 1890s; their engines were replaced and the boilers were ducted into a single large funnel. These improvements increased the speeds of the ships to 14.5 to 15.4 kn (26.9 to 28.5 km/h; 16.7 to 17.7 mph). The battery of 8.7 mm guns was replaced with an equal number of 8.8 cm (3.5 in) SK L/30 guns and four 3.7 cm (1.5 in) guns. Each ship also had its old wrought iron armor and teak backing replaced with new Krupp armor that significantly increased their ability to withstand shell hits.

== Construction ==
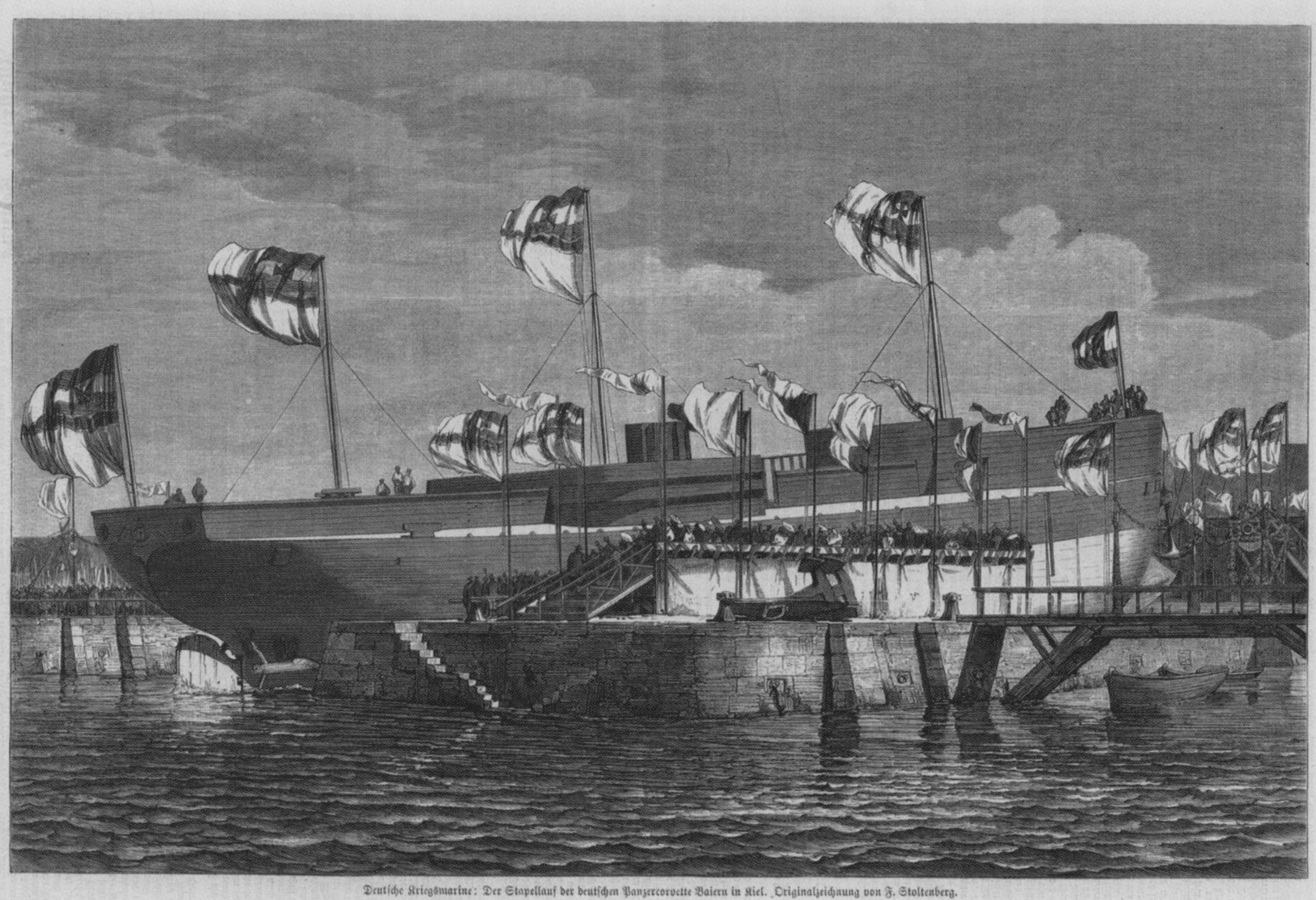
The launching of Bayern

Sachsen, the first ship of the class, was laid down at the AG Vulcan shipyard in Stettin in 1875, under construction number 74. The ship was launched on 21 July 1877 and commissioned into the fleet on 20 October 1878. AG Vulcan also built Württemberg, which was laid down in 1876 under construction number 78. She was launched on 9 November 1878 and commissioned for service on 9 May 1881.

Bayern was actually the first ship to be laid down; work on her keel began in 1874 at the Kaiserliche Werft (Imperial Dockyard) in Kiel, under construction number 3. She was not launched until 13 May 1878, nearly one year after her sister Sachsen. She was commissioned on 4 August 1881, rendering her the third ship of the class to enter service. Baden was the fourth and final ship of the class; she was laid down at the Imperial Dockyard in Kiel in 1876. She was launched on 28 July 1880 and commissioned into the fleet on 24 September 1883.

The ships built by AG Vulcan—Sachsen and Württemberg—were completed in three and five years, respectively. The two vessels built by the Imperial Dockyard—Bayern and Baden—required eight and seven years of work, respectively. One of the primary causes for the great disparity in build times was that after Sachsen experienced difficulties in her initial sea trials, work on the other three ships was halted while AG Vulcan implemented changes to correct the problems. Additionally, the experience of the shipbuilders played a significant role. AG Vulcan was an established commercial shipbuilder, while the Imperial Dockyards were recently founded and still lacked experience in large warship construction.

== Service history ==
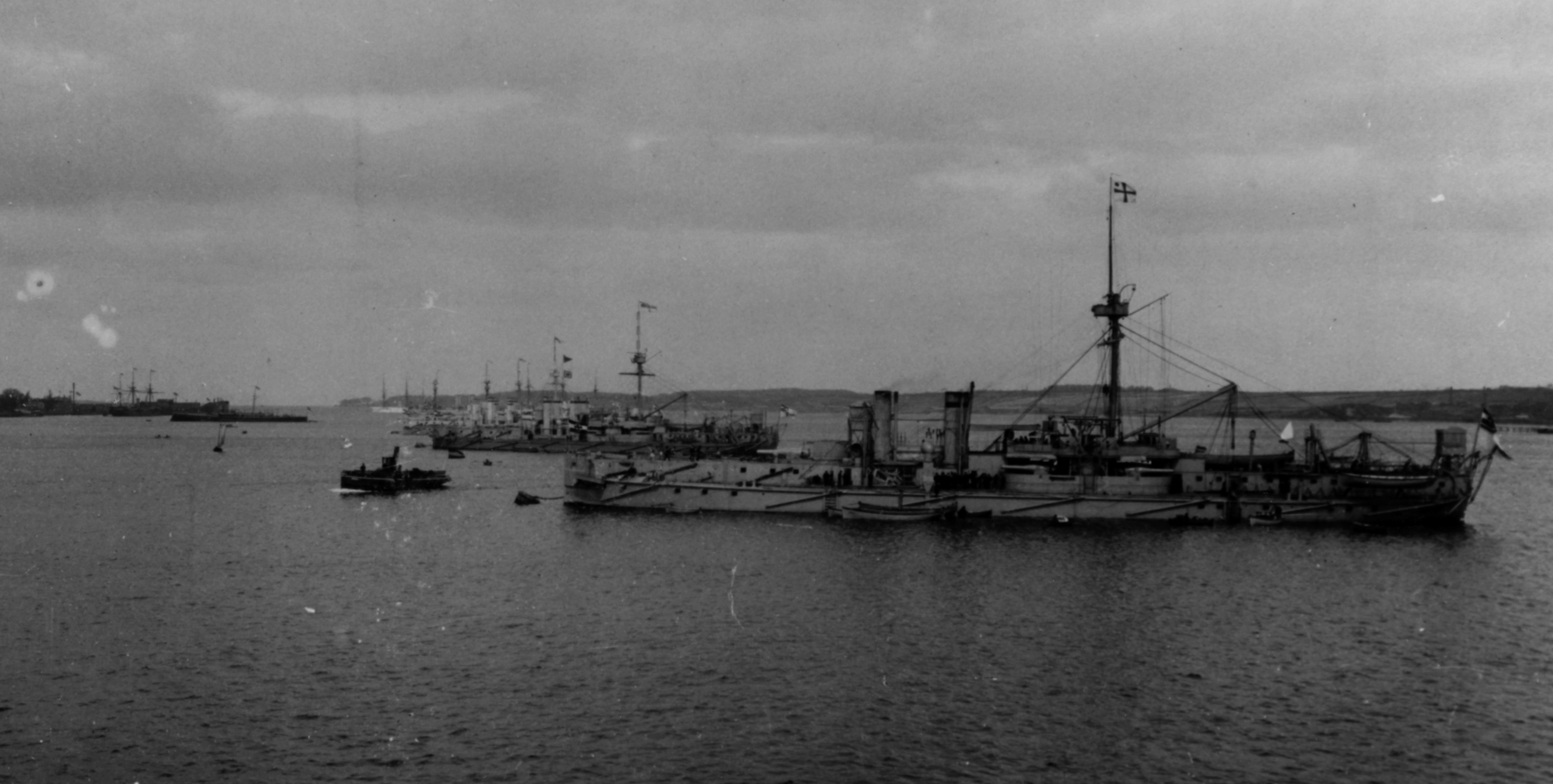
The German fleet at anchor in 1896; the four Sachsen-class ironclads are at right

Though Sachsen entered service in 1878, she only participated in one annual fleet exercise, in 1880, before all four ships were assigned to the 1884 maneuvers. This was due to the poor performance of Sachsen in the 1880 maneuvers and the negative reputation of the class. Among the problems associated with the Sachsen-class ships was a tendency to roll dangerously due to their flat bottoms, which greatly reduced the accuracy of their guns. The ships were also poorly armored, compared to their contemporaries. In addition, they were slow and suffered from poor maneuverability. The four ships served rotations with the fleet for the next two years, though in 1886, all four were demobilized as the Reserve Division in the Baltic. Aside from the Sachsen's half-sister Oldenburg, the German Navy took a hiatus on capital ship building until the late 1880s when the first of the Siegfried-class coastal defense ships were laid down. The poor performance of the sortie corvettes, coupled with the rise of the Jeune École, led Leo von Caprivi to abandon capital ship construction in favor of torpedo boats.

The ships were reactivated for a number of ceremonial duties in the late 1880s, including for the dedication of the Kaiser Wilhelm Canal in June 1887 and a tour of the Baltic by the recently crowned Kaiser Wilhelm II in 1888. In the 1890s, all four ships returned to active service with the fleet, serving in I Division until the middle of the decade, when the new Brandenburg-class battleships began entering service. The four Sachsens were then displaced to II Division. In the late 1890s, all four of the ships were extensively reconstructed; their secondary armament was modernized and their propulsion systems were rebuilt with new machinery, which increased their speed.

The four ships remained with the fleet until shortly after the turn of the century. Sachsen was removed from duty in 1902 and used as a target ship from 1911 to 1919. Bayern was stricken from the naval register in February 1910 and similarly used as a target vessel until 1919. Württemberg was converted into a torpedo training ship in 1906, equipped with seven 45 cm (18 in) torpedo tubes in a variety of different mountings. She served in this capacity until 1919, when she was used briefly as an escort for F-boats. All three ships were broken up for scrap between 1919 and 1920. Baden survived the longest, serving as a boom defense hulk after 1910 and a target ship after 1920. She remained in the German Navy's inventory until 1938, when she was sold for scrapping.
