= SMS Baden (1880) =

Armored corvette of the German Imperial Navy

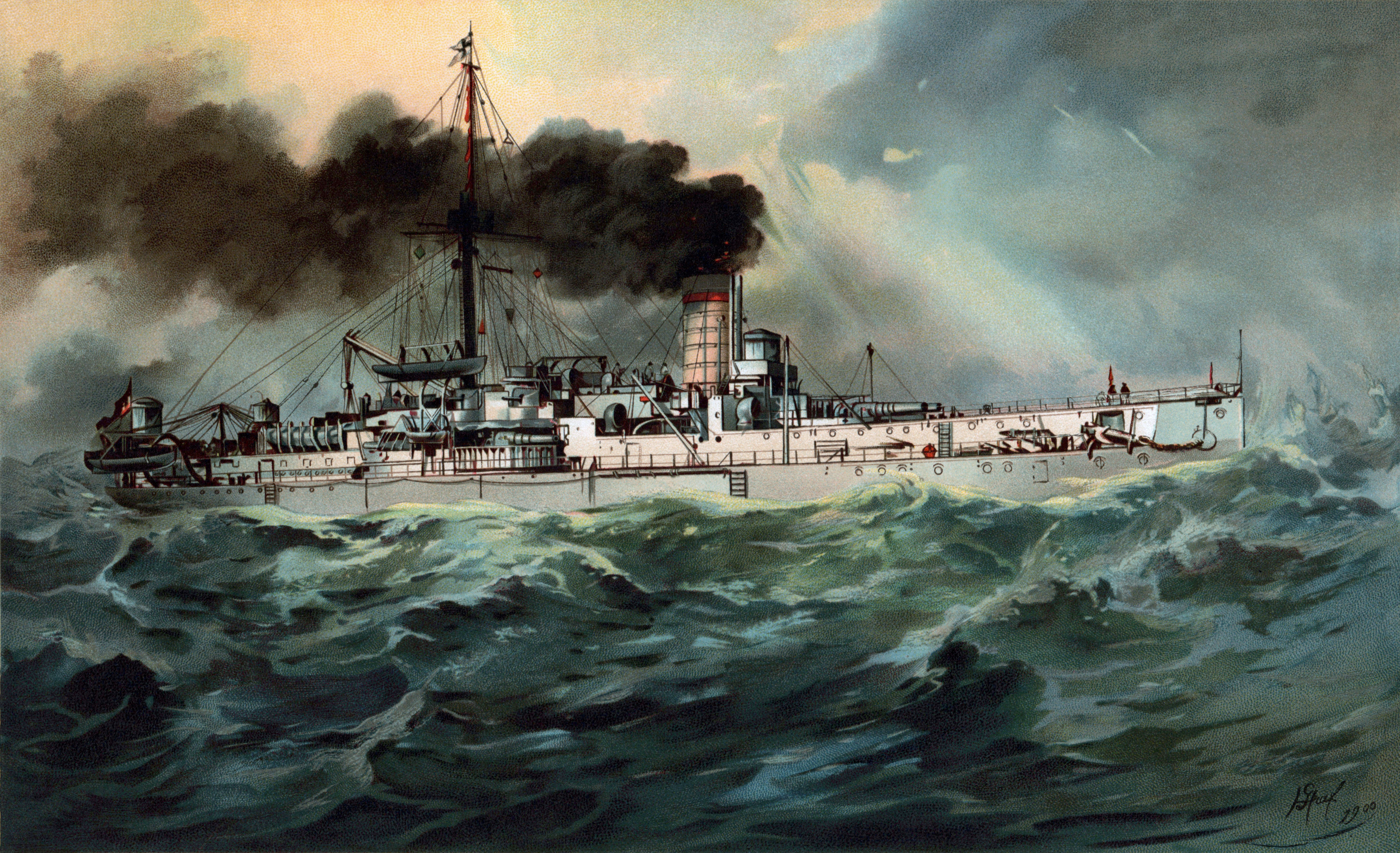
- Lithograph of Baden in 1900

History

German Empire
- Name: SMS Baden
- Builder: Kaiserliche Werft, Kiel
- Laid down: August 1876
- Launched: 28 July 1880
- Commissioned: 24 September 1883
- Decommissioned: 28 September 1903
- Stricken: 24 October 1910
- Fate: Broken up, 1938

General characteristics
- Class & type: Sachsen-class ironclad
- Displacement: 7,938 t (7,813 long tons)
- Length: 98.2 m (322 ft 2 in)
- Beam: 18.4 m (60 ft 4 in)
- Draft: 6.32 m (20 ft 9 in)
- Installed power: 8 × Dürr boilers; 5,600 ihp (4,200 kW)
- Propulsion: 2 × single-expansion steam engines; 2 × screw propellers
- Speed: 13 knots (24 km/h; 15 mph)
- Range: 1,940 nmi (3,590 km; 2,230 mi) at 10 kn (19 km/h; 12 mph)
- Complement: 32 officers; 285 enlisted men
- Armament: 6 × 26 cm (10.2 in) L/22 guns; 6 × 8.7 cm (3.4 in) guns; 8 × 3.7 cm (1.5 in) guns
- Armor: Belt: 203–254 mm (8–10 in); Deck: 50–75 mm (2–3 in)

SMS Baden (Note: "SMS" stands for "Seiner Majestät Schiff", or "His Majesty's Ship".) was one of four Sachsen-class armored frigates of the German Kaiserliche Marine (Imperial Navy). Her sister ships were Sachsen, Bayern, and Württemberg. Baden was built in the Kaiserliche Marine (Imperial Dockyard) in Kiel from 1876 to 1883. The ship was commissioned into the Imperial Navy in September 1883. She was armed with a main battery of six 26 cm (10.2 in) guns in two open barbettes.

After her commissioning, Baden served with the fleet on numerous training exercises and cruises in the 1880s and 1890s, during which she frequently simulated hostile naval forces. She participated in several cruises escorting Kaiser Wilhelm II on state visits to Great Britain and to various countries in the Baltic Sea in the late 1880s and early 1890s. During 1896–1897, the ship was extensively rebuilt at the Germaniawerft dockyard in Kiel. She was removed from active duty in 1910 and thereafter served in a number of secondary roles, finally serving as a target hulk in the 1920s and 1930s. She was sold in April 1938 and broken up in 1939–1940 in Kiel.

== Design ==
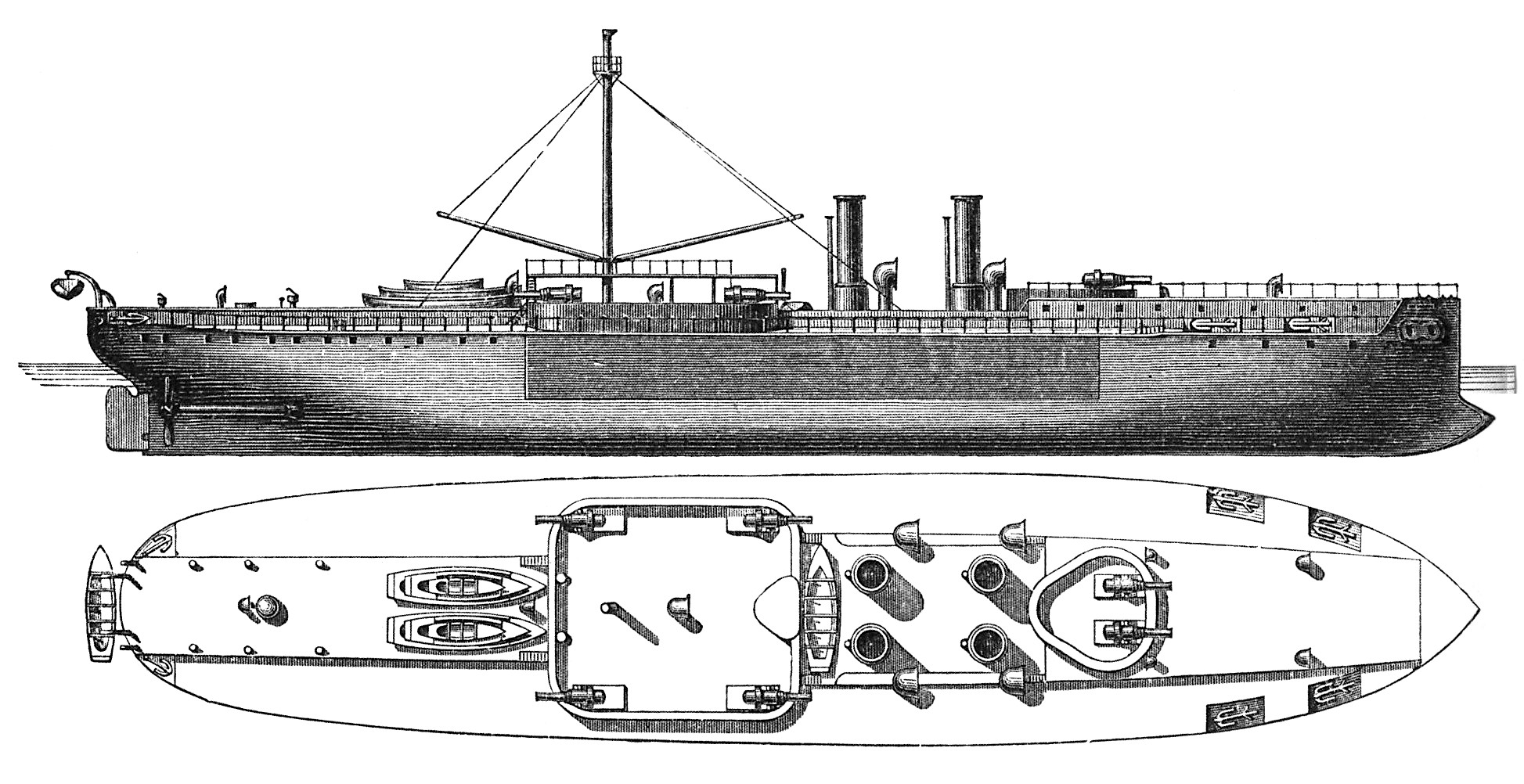
Plan and profile drawing of the Sachsen-class ships

The Sachsen class was the first group of capital ships built under the tenure of General Albrecht von Stosch, the first Chief of the Imperial Admiralty. Stosch favored a coastal defense strategy for the German fleet, and the Sachsens were intended to operate from fortified ports, from which they could sortie to attack blockading fleets. They proved to be controversial in service, as critics pointed out their poor seakeeping, tendency to roll in heavy seas, and low speed compared to earlier armored frigates.

The ship was 98.2 m (322 ft 2 in) long overall and had a beam of 18.4 m (60 ft 4 in) and a draft of 6.32 m (20 ft 9 in) forward. Baden was powered by two 3-cylinder single-expansion steam engines, which were supplied with steam by eight coal-fired Dürr boilers. The boilers were vented into four funnels in an unusual square arrangement. The ship's top speed was 13 knots (24 km/h; 15 mph), at 5,600 metric horsepower (5,500 ihp). Her standard complement consisted of 32 officers and 285 enlisted men, though while serving as a squadron flagship this was augmented by another 7 officers and 34 men.

She was armed with a main battery of six 26 cm (10.2 in) guns, two of which were single-mounted in an open barbette forward of the conning tower and the remaining four mounted amidships, also on single mounts in an open barbette. As built, the ship was also equipped with six 8.7 cm (3.4 in) L/24 guns and eight 3.7 cm (1.5 in) Hotchkiss revolver cannons for defense against torpedo boats.

Baden's armor was made of wrought iron, and was concentrated in an armored citadel amidships. The armor ranged from 203 to 254 mm (8 to 10 in) on the armored citadel, and between 50–75 mm (2–3 in) on the deck. The barbette armor was 254 mm of wrought iron backed by 250 mm of teak.

=== Modifications ===
Between late 1895 and late 1897, Baden was extensively modernized to prolong her useful service life. The ship's old wrought iron and teak armor was replaced with new Krupp nickel-steel armor. The four funnels were ducted into a single large funnel and new engines were also installed, which increased the ship's speed to 14.9 kn (27.6 km/h; 17.1 mph). The ship's 8.7 cm guns were replaced with quick-firing 8.8 cm (3.5 in) SK L/30 guns and four 3.7 cm (1.5 in) autocannon.

== Service history ==
=== Construction – 1887 ===
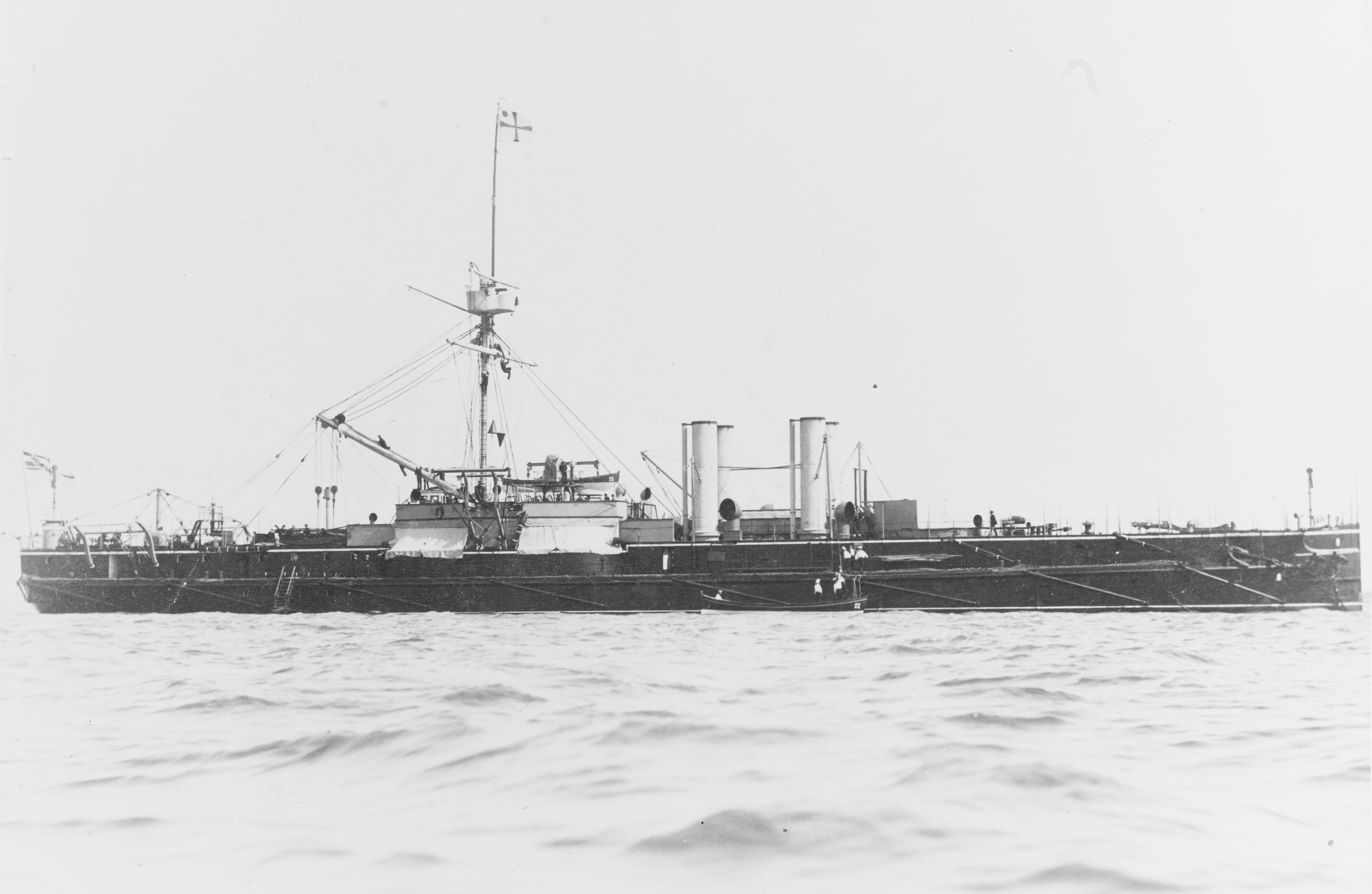
Baden early in her career

Baden was ordered by the Imperial Navy under the contract name "C," which denoted that the vessel was a new addition to the fleet. (Note: German warships were ordered under provisional names. Additions to the fleet were given a single letter; ships intended to replace older or lost vessels were ordered as "Ersatz (name of the ship to be replaced)".) She was built at the Imperial Dockyard in Kiel; her keel was laid down in August 1876 under yard number 4. The ship was launched on 28 July 1880, and Crown Prince Friedrich Wilhelm gave a speech at the ceremony. She was commissioned to begin sea trials on 24 September 1883, which were completed on 22 October. Along with her three sisters, Baden was the first large, armored warship built for the German navy that relied entirely on engines for propulsion. Following her commissioning, Baden joined the fleet too late to participate in the fleet maneuvers that year. After entering service, Baden served as the flagship for Konteradmiral (KAdm—Rear Admiral) Alexander von Monts; she was assigned to I Division alongside her three sisters. The unit, which also included the aviso Blitz, formed the homogenous core of the German fleet for many years. In April 1884, Kapitän zur See (KzS—Captain at Sea) Victor Valois took command of the ship.

General Leo von Caprivi, who had recently replaced Stosch as the Chief of the Admiralty, was concerned about the prospect of a two-front war against France and Russia, and particularly of the risk of an amphibious attack on Germany's coast. The 1884 training year included a joint coastal defense training operation off Gdingen with the 1st Life Hussars Regiment on 7 July. The fleet then shifted to exercises off Germany's North Sea coast. The annual fleet maneuvers held in September were cancelled on the 3rd of the month after the screw corvette SMS Sophie collided with the Norddeutscher Lloyd steamer SS Hohenstaufen and was seriously damaged. After Baden and the rest of her division returned to the Baltic Sea, they staged a mock attack on Kiel in mid-September, another coastal defense exercise. Baden was then decommissioned for the winter on 30 September.

The ship was placed in reserve in 1885, but returned to active duty the following year for training exercises with the fleet in September. That year, Baden was involved with the first testing of anti-torpedo nets aboard ships. On returning to service on 23 May 1886, Bayern came under the command of KzS Max Plüddemann. The ironclad squadron was reconstituted on 30 July for training exercises; the unit was redesignated from the Training Squadron to the Maneuver Squadron. Baden remained the flagship, though now of Vizeadmiral (VAdm—Vice Admiral) Wilhelm von Wickede. The German fleet conducted exercises in the western Baltic, including experiments with an early electrical communication system. They then conducted a training cruise to Skagen Odde, followed by a simulated attack on Wilhelmshaven and then blockade training in Danzig Bay. Caprivi and Prince Wilhelm observed the conclusion of the fleet maneuvers on 22 September; the next day, the Maneuver Squadron was disbanded for the winter and Baden was again reduced to reserve status. On 6 June 1887, Germany dedicated the Kaiser Wilhelm Canal; Baden was among the ships present during the celebrations. Baden remained in reserve for the remainder of the year.

=== 1888–1889 ===
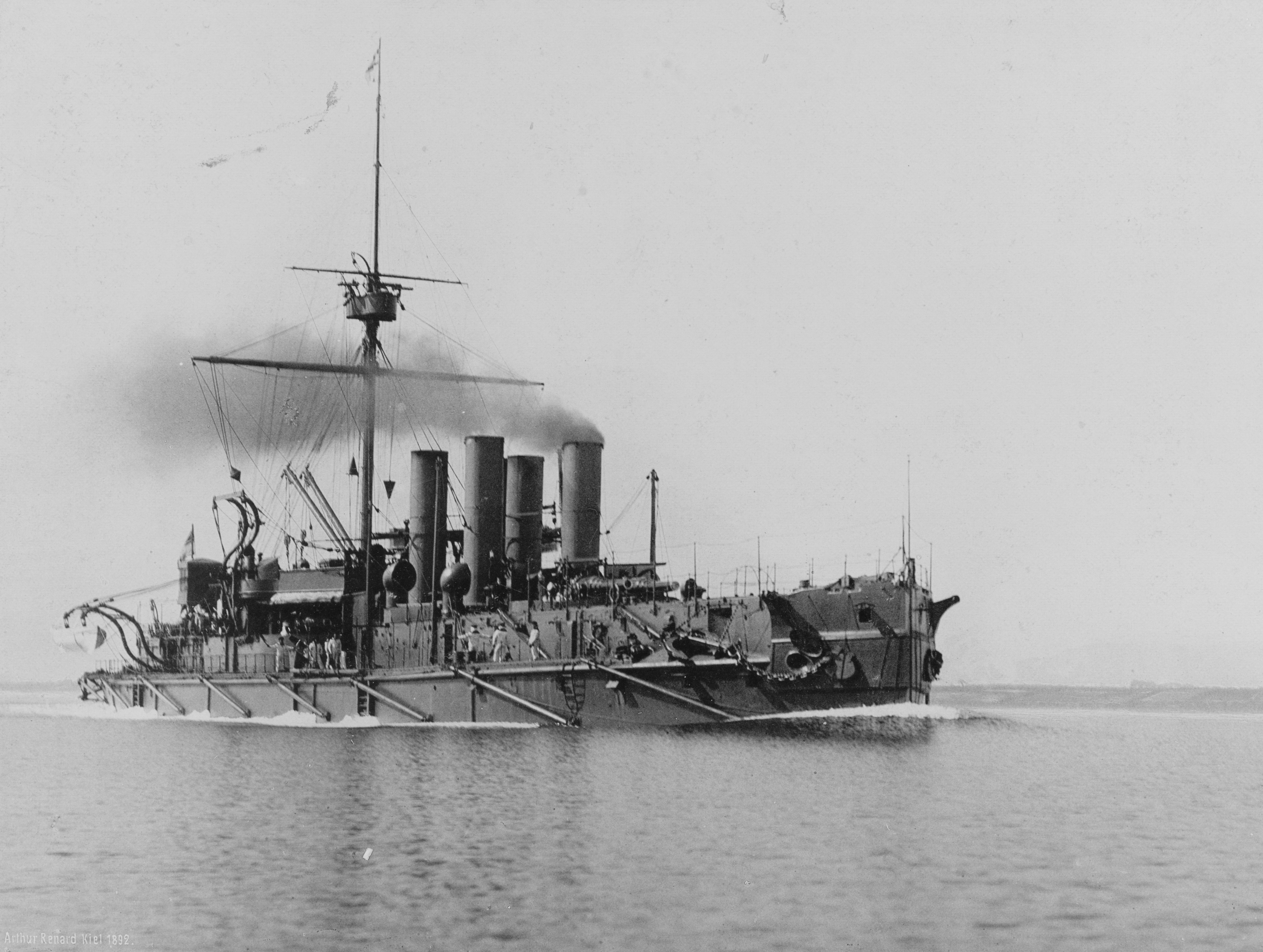
Baden steaming at high speed, sometime after 1892

Baden returned to active duty in early 1888, joining the Ironclad Squadron as its flagship on 23 May; the unit also included her sister ship Bayern, the ironclad Friedrich der Grosse, and the aviso Zieten, and it was soon joined by the ironclad Kaiser. By that time, Kaiser Wilhelm I had died and his son, Friedrich Wilhelm, briefly succeeded Wilhelm before he, too, died and was succeeded by his son, Wilhelm II in the Year of the Three Emperors. KAdm Eduard Knorr hoisted his flag aboard Baden that year. On 19 June, the ship's crew assisted the steamer SS Nord, which had caught fire in Kiel. The year's training maneuvers were shortened considerably in July, when Baden and much of the fleet embarked on a cruise in the Baltic that Wilhelm II attended. The voyage included stops in St. Petersburg, Stockholm, and Copenhagen over the course of the seventeen-day cruise. While on the trip, Wilhelm met with Alexander III of Russia, Oscar II of Sweden, and Christian IX of Denmark, in the respective cities. Baden ran aground in the harbors of both Stockholm and Copenhagen, but was not seriously damaged in either incident.

After returning to Danzig on 31 July, the ships of the fleet resumed their training exercises, which began with another mock attack on Kiel to test the coastal defense system. The Maneuver Fleet was organized on 31 August to begin the annual fleet maneuvers; it consisted of the Ironclad Squadron, the Training Ship Squadron, and two flotillas of torpedo boats. The ships once again made the voyage around Denmark from the Baltic to the North Sea for further coastal defense exercises in the Jade Bay, which were overseen by now-VAdm Monts. These exercises continued into mid-September; from the 11th to the 14th, Wilhelm II attended the maneuvers and took Monts' place as the commanding admiral. The Maneuver Fleet was disbanded on 14 September and four days later, the Ironclad Squadron was also disbanded for the winter. Baden was once again decommissioned on 21 September and assigned to the Reserve Division of the Baltic Sea. On 1 October, the unit was renamed as the II Reserve Division.

On 1 May 1889, Baden was recommissioned for the year's training cycle, once again serving as the squadron flagship of KAdm Philipp von Kall. Sachsen and Oldenburg joined her in the unit, along with the aviso Wacht. The squadron joined the Maneuver Fleet on 1 July; Baden's squadron was organized as I Division, which was joined by II Division of four other ironclads, a torpedo boat flotilla, and a division of armored gunboats. The year's training exercises were interrupted by the visit to Great Britain in August 1889, where Wilhelm II took part in the Cowes Regatta. The ships departed Germany on 31 July, escorting the Kaiser's yacht Hohenzollern. Baden and the rest of the fleet joined the Royal Navy in a fleet review for Queen Victoria during the visit, which concluded on 10 August. After returning to Germany, the fleet conducted its annual maneuvers, which were again overseen by Monts. He made Baden his flagship during the latter stage of the exercises, from 24 to 27 August. The Maneuver Fleet was disbanded again on 31 July and Baden was stationed as a guard ship in Kiel. In October, the ship was present to receive a British ironclad squadron visiting Kiel and later the Alexander III of Russia. During this period, Baden was also used to train engine room personnel.

=== 1890–1892 ===
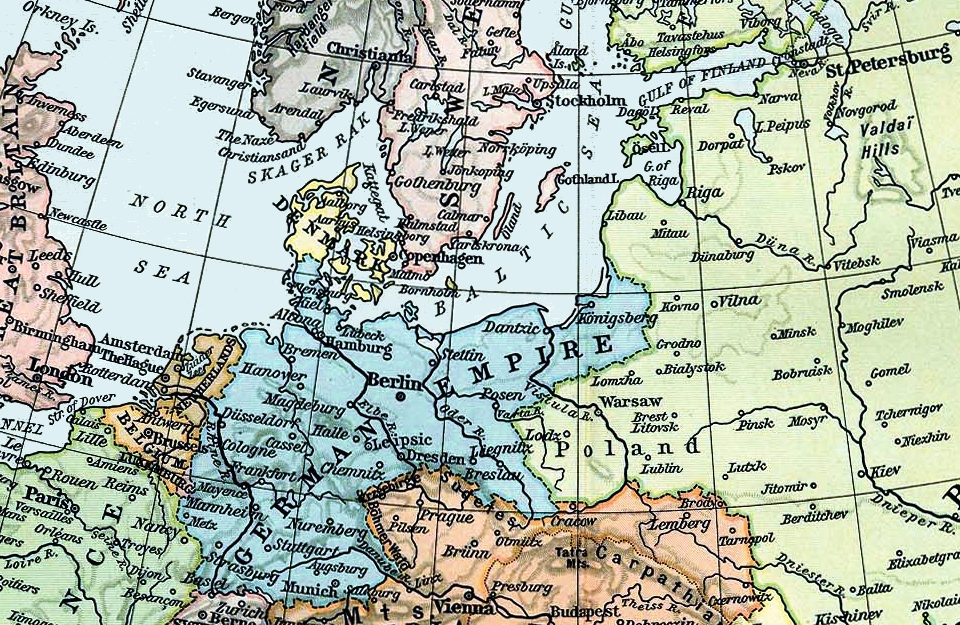
Map of the North and Baltic Seas in 1911

Baden was recommissioned in 1890 to return to her role as flagship of the Maneuver Squadron, which was reestablished on 2 May. The unit also included Bayern, Württemberg, Oldenburg, and Zieten, and it was commanded by VAdm Karl August Deinhard. The year's training exercises passed uneventfully, though they marked the first time that the expanding German fleet could field two full torpedo-boat divisions at once. That year, Baden and the rest of the fleet again escorted Wilhelm II on state visits to Copenhagen and Christiania, Norway. On 10 August, the fleet assembled off the island of Helgoland to mark the annexation of the island under the terms of the Heligoland–Zanzibar Treaty with Britain. On 29 August, an Austro-Hungarian squadron visited Germany and Baden hosted Wilhelm II during a fleet review held to mark the visit. During the fleet maneuvers of 1890, Baden and the rest of the capital ships of I and II Divisions simulated a Russian attack on Kiel. The exercises were held in conjunction with IX Corps of the German Army, several divisions of which acted as a simulated amphibious invasion. These exercises were carried out at Düppel and Alsen. Following the conclusion of the exercises on 12 September, the Maneuver Fleet was once again disbanded, and Baden returned to duty as a guard ship in Kiel. She was replaced by Bayern in January 1891 to permit Baden to undergo an overhaul.

Baden was recommissioned on 1 May 1891 and returned to I Division of the Maneuver Fleet, which was again commanded by Deinhard. At the same time, KzS Richard Geissler took command of the ship. The unit was also joined by the new coastal defense ship Siegfried, which relieved Württemberg. On 26 June, Baden assisted the ironclad Kaiser, which had run aground on an unmarked shoal. During the 1891 maneuvers, I Division generally "fought" on the German side, against either Franco-Russian or Danish-Russian alliances. On 25 August, the naval high command issued an order that the Maneuver Squadron would remain operational through the winter of 1891–1892, though the ships were initially given other duties; Baden temporarily left the unit to resume guard ship duties in Kiel. During a training cruise in the Baltic in January 1892 after the squadron reformed, Baden ran lightly aground off Langeland but was quickly refloated and was not damaged in the accident. At around that time, KK—Corvette Captain) Richard Hornung replaced Geissler as the ship's captain. The maneuvers of the early 1890s were generally disappointments, as the "hostile" forces were judged to be the victors in the majority of the scenarios.

By 1892, Admiral Max von der Goltz, the commanding admiral of the Imperial Naval High Command, had appointed KzS Alfred von Tirpitz as his chief of staff. Tirpitz set out to develop modern fleet tactics. VAdm Wilhelm Schröder replaced Deinhard as the fleet commander aboard Baden in May. At the same time, KzS Claussen von Fink replaced Hornung as the ship's commander, though he remained in the position for just three months before he died. He was in turn replaced by KzS Ernst Fritze. The fleet's training activities were interrupted in early June by another visit by the Russian tsar, during which Alexander III came aboard Baden in Kiel. The autumn fleet maneuvers were redesigned at Tirpitz's direction, and Goltz oversaw them as the commanding admiral. He and Tirpitz observed the exercises from the artillery training ship Mars. The assembled fleet of ten ironclads, three corvettes, five avisos, and twenty-eight torpedo boats carried out a series of experimental maneuvers and tests to determine basic questions of fleet tactics. Also in 1892, Baden and Bayern received a new blue-gray paint scheme on an experimental basis; it would later be applied to all vessels in home waters in 1895. Unlike in previous years, Baden did not serve as a guard ship in Kiel in 1892.

=== 1893–1895 ===
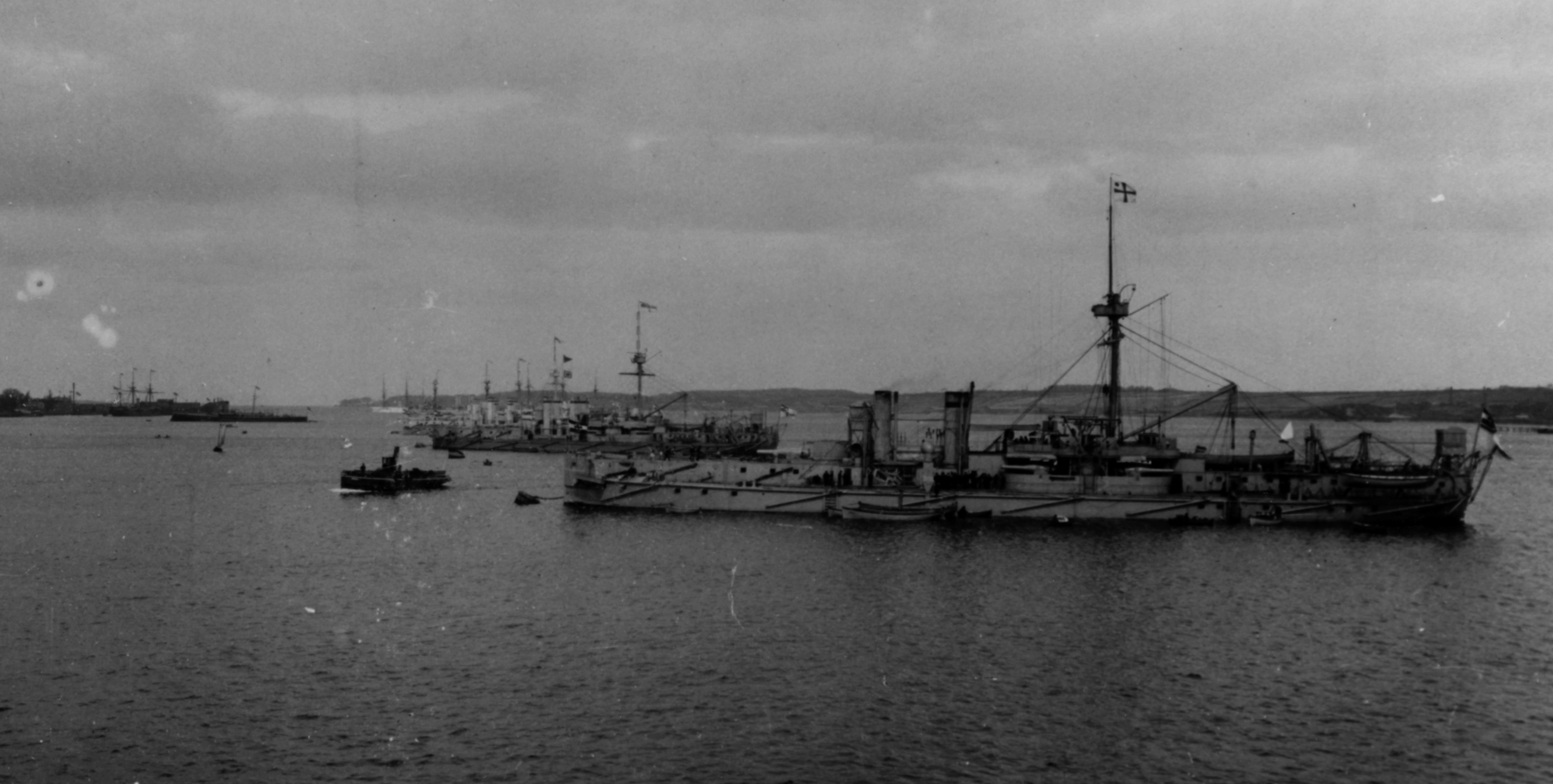
The German fleet at anchor around 1896; the four Sachsen-class ironclads are at right

The training year for 1893 passed similarly to the previous year. Events of note include an accidental explosion of one of her shells during shooting practice in the Strander Bucht on 2 August. The blast killed nine men and badly wounded another eighteen. Goltz and Tirpitz again shifted to Mars for the autumn fleet maneuvers, which were carried out from 20 August to 23 September. These exercises proved to have significant long-term impact on the German fleet; they were the basis for the "Service Regulations IX", which governed German future training exercises. The experience Goltz and Tirpitz gained also led to the passing of the first Naval Law in 1898. On 15 November, VAdm Hans von Koester replaced Schröder as the Maneuver Squadron commander; Koester kept Baden as his flagship.

The year 1894 differed significantly for Baden in one major respect; during the annual fleet maneuvers, which lasted from 19 August to 21 September, she no longer served as the fleet flagship. She was replaced in that role by the new pre-dreadnought battleship Wörth. By the winter of 1894–1895, the last of the four Brandenburg-class battleships had been commissioned; these ships were assigned to I Division, which displaced Baden and her three sisters to II Division. At the same time, Koester left Baden and transferred his flag to the Brandenburg-class battleship Kurfürst Friedrich Wilhelm. Baden was instead used as the flagship of the II Division commander, KAdm Otto von Diederichs, who came aboard the ship on 25 September (though Diederichs remained aboard only briefly before being replaced by KAdm Carl Barandon). At the same time, KzS Max Galster relieved Fritze as the ship's captain, though he served in that capacity for just two months before being replaced by KzS Oscar von Schuckmann. The eight ships conducted training cruises over the winter and spring before conducting the annual autumn fleet exercises. On 21 June 1895, the Kaiser Wilhelm Canal was opened for traffic, eight years after work had begun. Baden and her three sisters, along with dozens of other warships, attended the ceremonies. The major naval powers sent fleets to join the fleet review. The Autumn 1895 maneuvers simulated a high-seas battle between I and II Divisions in the North Sea, followed by combined maneuvers with the rest of the fleet in the Baltic.

On 9 April 1895, Baden took part in attempts to pull the protected cruiser SMS Kaiserin Augusta free after she had run aground in the Kieler Förde. In June, the ship took part in exercises with the rest of the squadron and ceremonies later in the month marking the opening of the Kaiser Wilhelm Canal after eight years of construction. The same month, Kapitänleutnant (KL—Captain Lieutenant) Hermann Lilie took command of the ship. Baden then went into drydock for periodic maintenance; Barandon transferred his flag to Sachsen on 25 July while Baden was out of service for the work. The ship returned to active service in time to take part in the autumn fleet maneuvers, under the temporary command of KzS Friedrich von Weitersheim, and from 1 to 20 October, she reprised her old role as squadron flagship for Koester while Kurfürst Friedrich Wilhelm was undergoing maintenance. Baden thereafter was decommissioned in Kiel on 11 December to begin a major reconstruction at the Germaniawerft shipyard there.

=== 1897–1940 ===
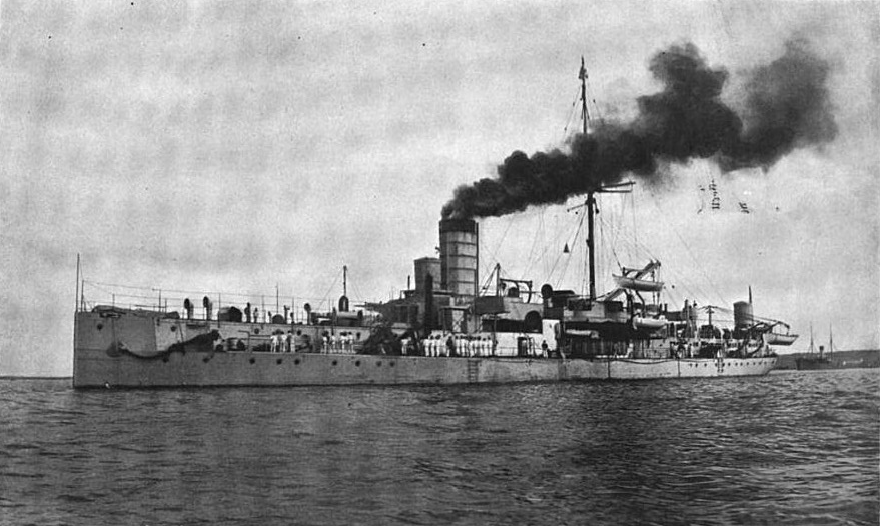
Baden after her reconstruction

Painting of Baden after her reconstruction, by Willy Stöwer

Work on the ship continued for two years, and Baden was recommissioned on 19 November 1897 under the command of KzS Oskar Stiege. She returned to II Division of what had been renamed I Squadron in 1896. There, she replaced Sachsen as the divisional flagship on 30 November. The unit included Württemberg, Oldenburg, and the aviso Greif, and was commanded by KAdm Felix von Bendemann. Five days earlier, the ship accidentally collided with the mole in Kiel and had to be docked briefly to repair the damage incurred in the incident. On 24 June 1898, the ship was involved in another accident, this time colliding with the protected cruiser Hertha, though neither vessel was seriously damaged in the minor collision. now-KAdm Weitersheim replaced Bendemann as the divisional commander on 7 October that year. Baden damaged one of her screws off Skagen, Denmark in early July 1899, requiring another stay in drydock to repair the damage. Baden met two Italian cruisers visiting Kiel in mid-September, though the rest of the fleet was not present. Stiege left the ship in September and was replaced the following month by FK Carl Franz. On 20 October, the ship was decommissioned in Wilhelmshaven; Weitersheim transferred his flag to Bayern at that time.

On 2 October 1900, Baden was reactivated and assigned to the Reserve Division of the North Sea, which also included Sachsen and Württemberg. At that time, KsZ August von Heeringen became the ship's captain. The unit was assigned to I Squadron to replace the Brandenburg-class battleships that had been sent to China as the Detached Division in response to the Boxer Uprising, though the Reserve Division remained officially under the direction of the II Naval Inspectorate. Baden took the role as flagship of the squadron deputy commander, KAdm Max von Fischel. In December, Baden and the protected cruiser Freya sailed to the Netherlands to participate in celebrations of the upcoming marriage of Queen Wilhelmina of the Netherlands and Duke Henry of Mecklenburg-Schwerin. Baden briefly served as the flagship of I Squadron from late January 1901 to 8 February; by this time, VAdm Prince Heinrich had become the squadron commander. During that period, she and the rest of the squadron—the coastal defense ship Hagen, the protected cruiser Victoria Louise, and the aviso SMS Jagd—visited Britain during commemorations of the death of Queen Victoria. In March, FK Eugen Kalau vom Hofe replaced Heeringen as Baden's captain.

The Detached Division returned to Germany in July 1901 and retook their place in I Squadron, displacing Baden and the rest of the Reserve Division to the newly created II Squadron, which had been organized for the annual fleet maneuvers. The squadron comprised III and IV Divisions, and Baden was assigned to the former. Following the conclusion of the exercises on 15 September, the squadron was disbanded and Baden reverted to the Reserve Division of the North Sea, based in Wilhelmshaven. In July 1902, Baden accidentally rammed the new pre-dreadnought Wittelsbach while the latter was still fitting out. Baden served as the flagship of II Squadron for the autumn fleet maneuvers that year, flying the flag of Ernst Fritze, who had by then been promoted to the rank of konteradmiral. The unit, which was organized on 31 July, also included Württemberg and the coastal defense ships Hagen, Hildebrand, Heimdall, and Beowulf. The squadron was again disbanded after the end of the exercises on 12 September and Baden returned to Wilhelmshaven for the rest of the year.

The ship returned to active fleet service on 4 July 1903, once again serving as the flagship of II Squadron for the fleet maneuvers, and once again under Fritze's command. This proved to be Baden's final period of active duty, as after the conclusion of the maneuvers on 12 September, she was sent to Kiel, where she was decommissioned on 28 September. She remained in the first category of reserve until 1906, when she was reduced to the second category of reserve. On 24 October 1910, she was struck from the naval register. Starting in early 1911, she was briefly employed as a target ship before being converted in February to a mine storage hulk with instructional and barracks rooms for the mine warfare school at Cuxhaven. On 3 August 1913, the ship was towed to Brunsbüttel, where she served as a coastal defense hulk (and plans were made to sink her as a block ship in the event of an emergency). In January 1916, during World War I, Baden was stationed at Altenbruch as a guard ship, and she remained there until June 1918. In 1920, she was converted into a target hulk and stationed off Stollergrund. The ship was finally sold on 23 April 1938 and broken up for scrap in 1939–1940 in Kiel.
