= Max von der Goltz =

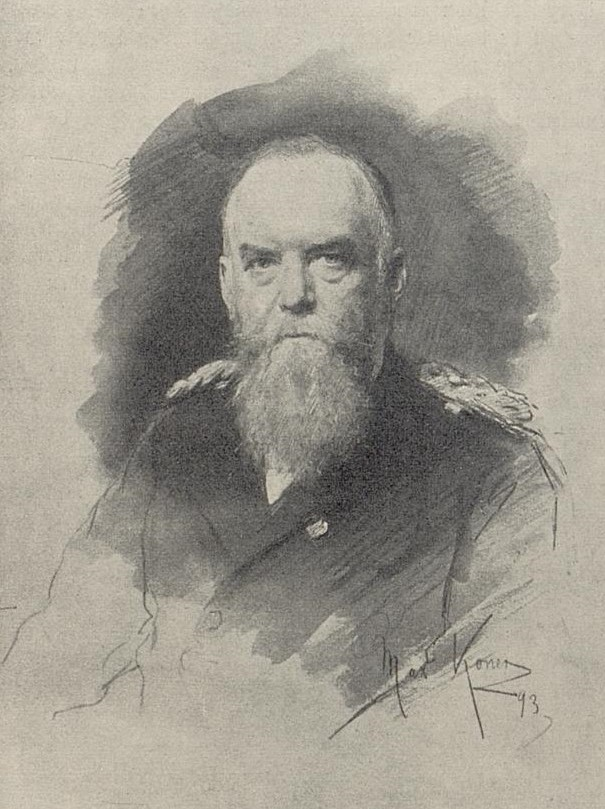
- Admiral Max von der Goltz, painted by Max Koner, 1893
- Born: April 19, 1838; Königsberg, Prussia
- Died: December 20, 1906 (aged 68); Potsdam, Prussia, German Empire
- Military career
- Allegiance: German Empire
- Branch: Imperial German Navy
- Service years: 1853-1895
- Rank: Admiral
- Commands: Commanding Admiral, Naval High Command

Otto Ferdinand Maximilian Leopold Freiherr von der Goltz (April 19, 1838 – December 20, 1906) was an Admiral of the Imperial German Navy (Kaiserliche Marine).

== Biography ==
Born into Von der Goltz noble family, he was born in Königsberg, Prussia as the son of Amadeus Bogislaw Ferdinand von der Goltz (1804-1851) and his wife, Louise Hampel (1812-1894). He joined the Prussian Navy in 1853, and became an Fähnrich zur See (midshipman) in 1859, and Kapitänleutnant (lieutenant) in 1865, and Korvettenkapitän in 1870. He was then at the Navy Ministry.

As captain (Kapitän zur See), he made several trips as the commander of the corvette Augusta to South America (Brazil) and West Indies. Between 1877 and 1882 he was the senior director of the shipyard in Kiel and reorganized the yard. He was then chief of the Mediterranean Squadron during the conflict in Egypt and in 1883 briefly became commander of the East Asia Squadron (Ostasiengeschwader) before being appointed as the Konteradmiral (rear admiral) and chief of the German Imperial Admiralty. Five years later he was made Vizeadmiral and appointed commander (Marinetstationschef) of the North Sea Naval Station (Marinestation der Nordsee) at Wilhelmshaven. In 1889 he became commanding admiral of the Kaiserliches Oberkommando der Marine (Naval High Command) and in 1892 Goltz finally became a full Admiral.

On 13 May 1895 von der Goltz resigned from his position for health reasons. He died on 20 December 1906 in Potsdam.

== Honours ==
- Kingdom of Prussia:
  - Knight of the Royal Order of the Crown, 2nd Class, 18 October 1881
  - Knight of the Order of the Red Eagle, 2nd Class with Oak Leaves, 18 January 1886; 1st Class, 27 January 1892
- United Kingdom: Honorary Grand Cross of the Most Distinguished Order of St Michael and St George, 2 April 1891
