= SMS Heimdall =

Coastal defense ship of the German Imperial Navy

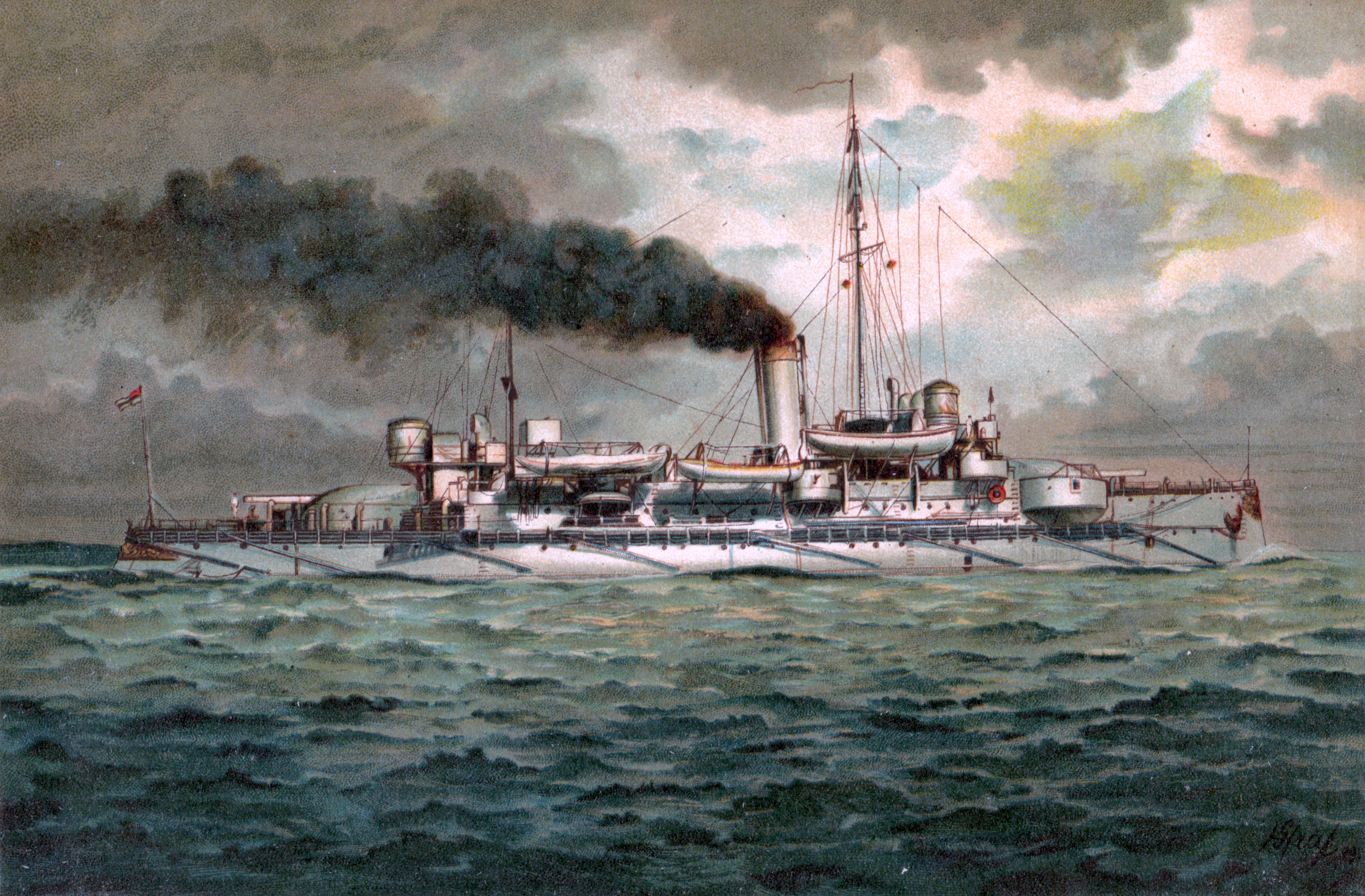
- Lithograph of Heimdall in 1902, showing her original configuration

History

German Empire
- Name: Heimdall
- Namesake: Heimdall
- Builder: Kaiserliche Werft, Wilhelmshaven
- Laid down: 2 November 1891
- Launched: 27 July 1892
- Commissioned: 7 April 1894
- Decommissioned: 2 March 1916
- Stricken: On 17 June 1919
- Fate: Scrapped at Rönnebeck, 1921

General characteristics
- Class & type: Siegfried-class coast defense ship
- Displacement: Normal: 3,500 t (3,400 long tons); Full load: 3,741 t (3,682 long tons)
- Length: 79 m (259.2 ft)
- Beam: 14.6 m (47.9 ft)
- Draft: 5.74 m (18.8 ft)
- Installed power: 4 × fire-tube boilers; 4,800 PS (3,500 kW)
- Propulsion: 2 × triple-expansion steam engines; 2 × screw propellers
- Speed: 14.9 knots (27.6 km/h; 17.1 mph)
- Range: 4,800 nmi (8,900 km; 5,500 mi) at 10 knots (19 km/h; 12 mph)
- Complement: 20 officers; 256 enlisted men
- Armament: 3 × 24 cm (9.4 in) guns; 8 × 8.8 cm (3.5 in) guns; 4 × 35 cm (13.8 in) torpedo tubes
- Armor: Waterline belt: 240 mm (9.4 in); Deck: 30 mm (1.2 in); Conning tower: 80 mm (3.1 in)

SMS Heimdall was the fourth vessel of the six-member Siegfried class of coastal defense ships (Küstenpanzerschiffe) built for the German Imperial Navy. Her sister ships were Siegfried, Beowulf, Frithjof, Hildebrand, and Hagen. Heimdall was built by the Kaiserliche Werft (Imperial Shipyard) in Wilhelmshaven between 1891 and 1894, and was armed with a main battery of three 24-centimeter (9.4 in) guns. She served in the German fleet throughout the 1890s and was rebuilt in 1900–1902. She served in the VI Battle Squadron after the outbreak of World War I in August 1914, but saw no action. Heimdall was demobilized in 1915 and used as a barracks ship thereafter. She was ultimately broken up for scrap in 1921.

== Design ==
In the late 1880s, the German Kaiserliche Marine (Imperial Navy) grappled with the problem of what type of capital ship to build in the face of limited naval budgets (owing to parliamentary objections to naval spending and the cost of dredging the Kaiser Wilhelm Canal). General Leo von Caprivi, the new Chef der Admiralität (Chief of the Admiralty), requested a series of design proposals, which ranged in size from small 2,500 t (2,461-long-ton) coastal defense ships to heavily armed 10,000 t (9,800-long-ton) ocean-going battleships. Caprivi ordered ten coastal defense ships to guard the entrances to the canal, since even opponents of the navy in the Reichstag (Imperial Diet) agreed that such vessels were necessary. The first six of these, the Siegfried class, were based on the smallest proposal. They carried their armament in an unusual layout, with two heavy guns forward that could be independently aimed; tactical doctrine of the day envisioned the ships breaking through an enemy line of battle (as the Austrians had done at the Battle of Lissa in 1866), and the arrangement would have allowed each ship to engage multiple targets.

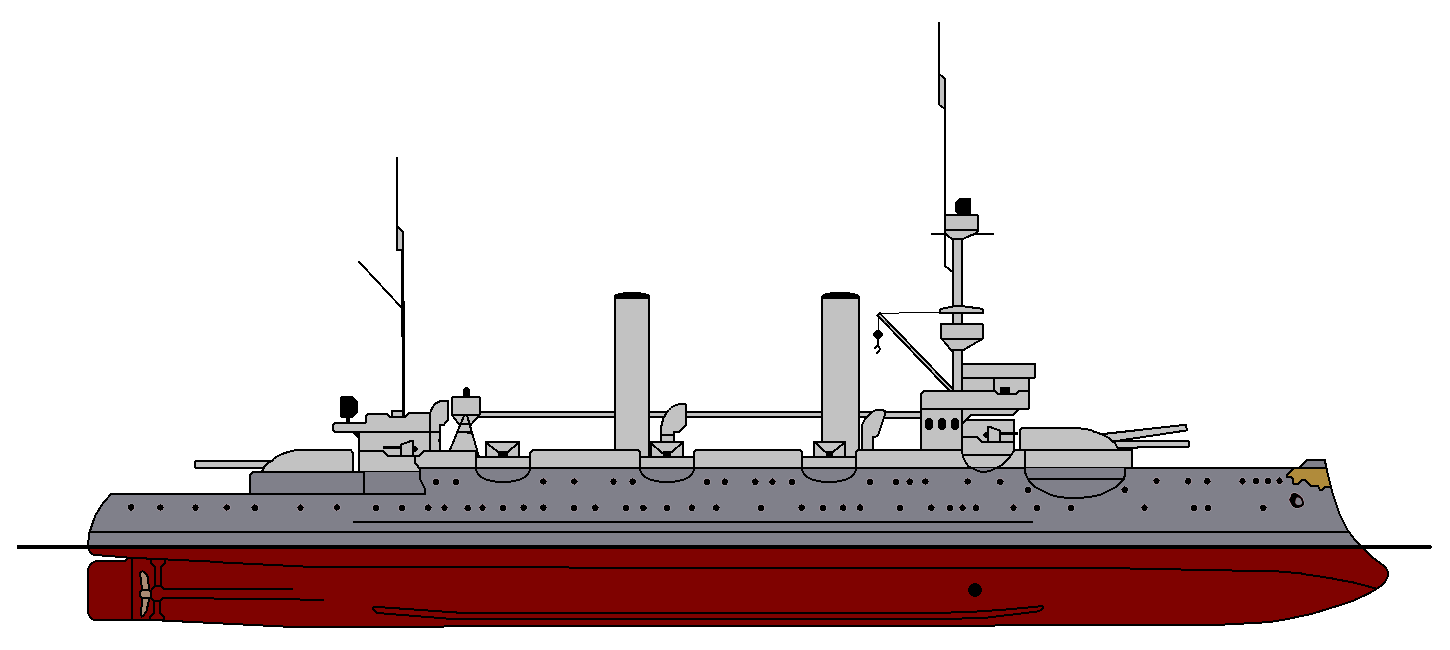
Profile drawing of Hagen in 1910

Heimdall was 79 meters (259 ft) long overall and had a beam of 14.9 m (49 ft) and a maximum draft of 5.74 m (18.8 ft). She displaced 3,500 t (3,400 long tons) normally and up to 3,741 t (3,682 long tons) at full load. Her hull had a long forecastle deck that extended most of the vessel's length. She was also fitted with a pronounced ram bow. Heimdall had a crew of 20 officers and 256 enlisted men.

Her propulsion system consisted of two vertical 3-cylinder triple-expansion engines, each driving a screw propeller. Steam for the engines was provided by four coal-fired fire-tube boilers that were vented through a single funnel. The ship's propulsion system provided a top speed of 14.6 knots (27.0 km/h; 16.8 mph) from 4,800 metric horsepower (3,500 kW) and a range of approximately 1,490 nautical miles (2,760 km; 1,710 mi) at 10 kn (19 km/h; 12 mph).

The ship was armed with a main battery of three 24 cm (9.4 in) K L/35 guns mounted in three single gun turrets. Two were placed side by side forward, and the third was located aft of the main superstructure. They were supplied with a total of 204 rounds of ammunition. For defense against torpedo boats, the ship was also equipped with a secondary battery of eight 8.8 cm (3.5 in) SK L/30 guns in single mounts. Heimdall also carried four 35 cm (13.8 in) torpedo tubes, all in swivel mounts on the deck. One was at the bow, another at the stern, and two amidships. The ship was protected by an armored belt that was 240 mm (9.4 in) in the central citadel, and an armored deck that was 30 mm (1.2 in) thick. The conning tower had 80 mm (3.1 in) thick sides. Heimdall's armor consisted of new Krupp steel, a more effective type of armor than the compound steel the other members of the class received.

=== Modifications ===
In 1897, the ship had her anti-torpedo nets removed. Heimdall was extensively rebuilt between 1901 and 1902 in an attempt to improve her usefulness. The ship was lengthened to 86.13 m (282.6 ft), which increased displacement to 4,436 t (4,366 long tons; 4,890 short tons) at full load. The lengthened hull space was used to install additional boilers; her old fire-tube boilers were replaced with more efficient water-tube boilers, and a second funnel was added. The performance of her propulsion machinery increased to 15.1 knots (28.0 km/h; 17.4 mph) from 5,064 metric horsepower (3,725 kW), with a maximum range of 3,400 nmi (6,300 km; 3,900 mi) at 10 knots. Her secondary battery was increased to ten 8.8 cm guns, and the 35 cm torpedo tubes were replaced with three 45 cm (17.7 in) tubes. Her crew increased to 20 officers and 287 enlisted men. Work was completed by 1900.

== Service history ==
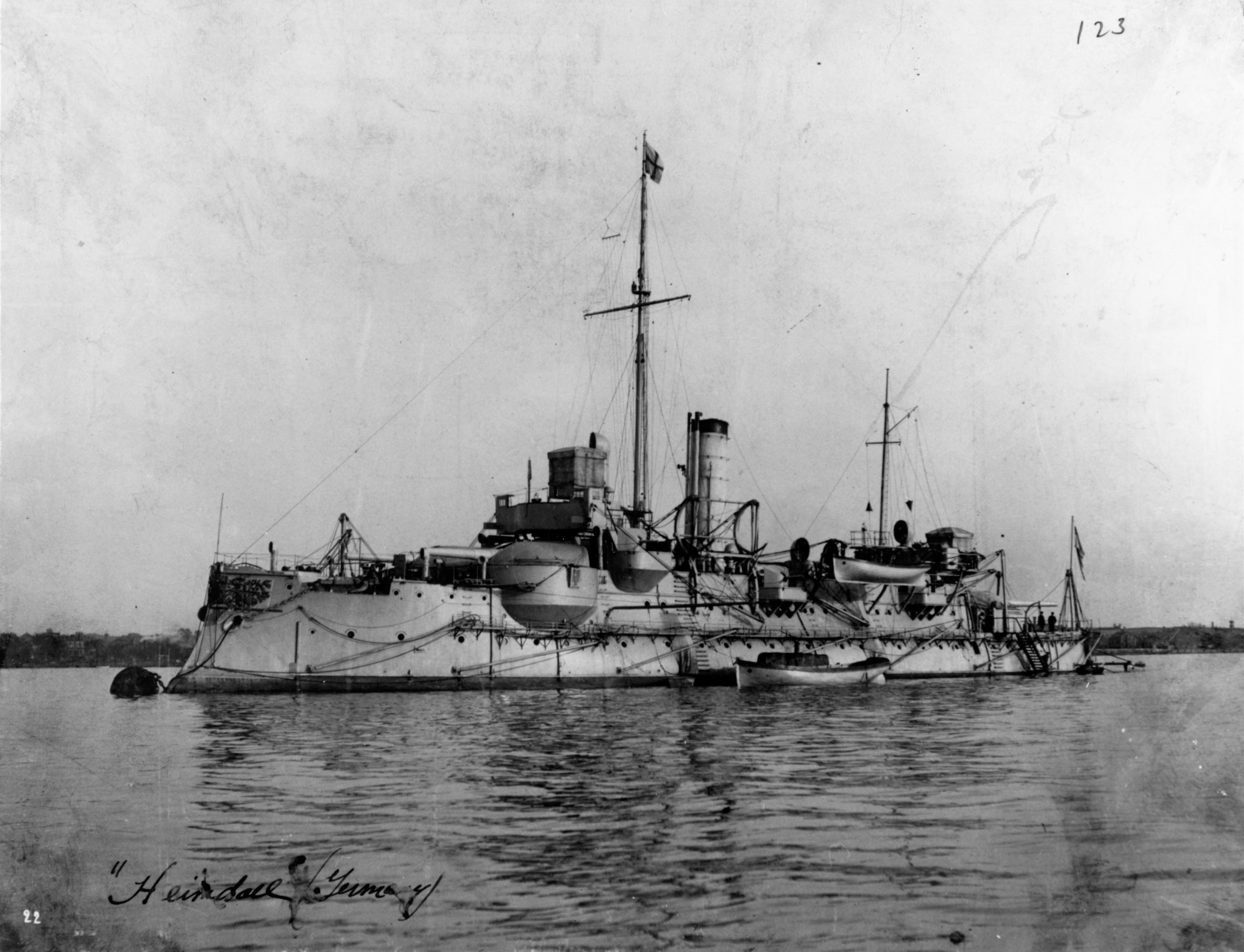
Heimdall early in her career

Heimdall was laid down on 2 November 1891 at the Kaiserliche Werft (Imperial Shipyard) in Wilhelmshaven under the provisional designation "U". (Note: German warships were ordered under provisional names. Additions to the fleet were given a single letter; ships intended to replace older or lost vessels were ordered as "Ersatz (name of the ship to be replaced)".) She was launched on 27 July 1892, and Kaiser Wilhelm II christened the ship at her launching. She was commissioned on 7 April 1894 to begin sea trials. Initial testing revealed serious defects with her boilers, forcing her to return to the shipyard for an extensive overhaul. Heimdall completed trials on 15 December, after which she was assigned to the Reserve Division of the Baltic Sea. She was transferred to Kiel and had her crew reduced while not in active service. The ship had her crew replenished in early 1895 to take part in training exercises with the Armored Ship Division in the western and central Baltic from April to June. During this period, she was commanded by Leutnant zur See (Lieutenant at Sea) Carl Schaumann, but in May, he was replaced by Korvettenkapitän (KK—Corvette Captain) Adolf Goetz. She was present for the opening ceremonies of the Kaiser Wilhelm Canal on 20 June. Crew shortages necessitated Heimdall's decommissioning on 5 July so that her crew would be available for vessels that were being sent to East Asia and Morocco.

The ship remained out of service until 8 August 1897, when she was recommissioned to take part in annual fleet maneuvers as part of II Battle Squadron, under the command of KK Oskar von Truppel. While steaming in Danish waters on 8 September, Heimdall suffered a serious accident and had to return to Kiel for repairs at the Kaiserliche Werft there. The ship was reactivated on 26 July 1898, KK Hermann Lilie serving as her captain, for the annual fleet exercises that concluded on 29 September, and was thereafter decommissioned again. Heimdall was next recommissioned for the fleet maneuvers of 1900, which lasted from 24 July to 29 September. The ship was commanded by KK Malte von Schimmelmann at that time. She was thereafter taken into hand at the Kaiserliche Werft in Kiel for a major modernization that lasted into 1902. As in previous years, the ship was reactivated to take part in summer training exercises from July to September in 1902 and 1903. KK Hartwig von Dassel and KK Paul Schlieper served as the ship's commander during the 1902 and 1903 reactivations, respectively. She was thereafter allocated to the reserve fleet, being reactivated just once more for maneuvers in the following ten years, in 1909. The ship's captain at that time was Fregattenkapitän (Frigate Captain) Carl Hollweg.

=== World War I ===
Lithograph of Heimdall and her sister Siegfried at sea

Following the outbreak of World War I in July 1914, Heimdall was mobilized into VI Battle Squadron for coastal defense, along with her sister ships and the two Odin-class coastal defense ships. Activated in August under the command of Kapitän zur See (KzS–Captain at Sea) Rudolf Bartels, the ship's crew was assembled by 14 September in Wilhelmshaven. She was initially used to guard the Jade Bight from 19 September to 6 October. The next day, she was moved to the mouth of the Weser, which she patrolled until 7 November, apart from a brief recall to the Jade in early November. The ships of VI Squadron were stationed in the outer Jade roadstead to cover the battlecruisers of I Scouting Group during the Raid on Yarmouth on 2–3 November. She thereafter returned briefly to the Weser before steaming to Wilhelmshaven. She remained on guard duty in the Jade from 18 November to 11 June 1915. During this period, on 23 December 1914, Heimdall accidentally rammed the dreadnought battleship Kaiserin in the Wilhelmshaven roadstead, but neither vessel was seriously damaged in the incident. Bartels became the senior-most officer of the guard ships stationed in the Ems on 15 June 1915.

On 31 August 1915, VI Battle Squadron was disbanded, but Heimdall remained on guard duty; she was assigned to the newly formed Coastal Defense Flotilla based in the Ems. At that time, KzS Ernst Ewers took command of the ship, and at the same time gained command of the new flotilla. In addition to her normal activities, she was also used as a target ship for shooting practice during this period. On 24 February 1916, Heimdall was withdrawn from active service, and she was decommissioned for the last time on 2 March in Emden. She was thereafter used as a barracks ship and tender for the U-boats of IV U-boat Flotilla and the guard ships that remained on station in the Ems. On 17 June 1919, she was stricken from the naval register. The navy planned to convert Heimdall into a salvage ship, but the plan fell through and she was instead sold and broken up for scrap in 1921 in Rönnebeck.
