= SMS Siegfried =

Coastal defense ship of the German Imperial Navy

- A 1902 lithograph of Siegfried

History

German Empire
- Name: Siegfried
- Namesake: Siegfried
- Laid down: 1888
- Launched: 10 August 1889
- Completed: 19 April 1890
- Commissioned: 29 April 1890
- Decommissioned: 31 August 1915
- Stricken: 17 June 1919
- Fate: Sold for scrap, 1920

General characteristics
- Class & type: Siegfried-class coast defense ship
- Displacement: Normal: 3,500 t (3,400 long tons); Full load: 3,741 t (3,682 long tons)
- Length: 79 m (259.2 ft)
- Beam: 14.90 m (48.9 ft)
- Draft: 5.74 m (18.8 ft)
- Installed power: 4 × fire-tube boilers; 4,800 PS (3,500 kW)
- Propulsion: 2 × triple-expansion steam engines; 2 × screw propellers
- Speed: 14.9 knots (27.6 km/h; 17.1 mph)
- Range: 1,490 nmi (2,760 km; 1,710 mi) at 10 knots (19 km/h; 12 mph)
- Complement: 20 officers; 256 enlisted men
- Armament: 3 × 24 cm (9.4 in) guns; 6 × 8.8 cm (3.5 in) guns; 4 × 35 cm (13.8 in) torpedo tubes
- Armor: Waterline belt: 240 mm (9.4 in); Deck: 30 mm (1.2 in); Conning tower: 80 mm (3.1 in)

SMS Siegfried was the lead ship of the six-member Siegfried class of coastal defense ships (Küstenpanzerschiffe) built for the German Imperial Navy. Her sister ships were Beowulf, Frithjof, Heimdall, Hildebrand, and Hagen. Siegfried was built by the Germaniawerft shipyard between 1888 and 1890, and was armed with a main battery of three 24-centimeter (9.4 in) guns. She served in the German fleet throughout the 1890s and was rebuilt in 1903 - 1904. She served in the VI Battle Squadron after the outbreak of World War I in August 1914, but saw no action. Siegfried was demobilized in 1915 and used as a barracks ship thereafter. She was ultimately broken up for scrap in 1920.

== Design ==
In the late 1880s, the German Kaiserliche Marine (Imperial Navy) grappled with the problem of what type of capital ship to build in the face of limited naval budgets (owing to parliamentary objections to naval spending and the cost of dredging the Kaiser Wilhelm Canal). General Leo von Caprivi, the new Chef der Admiralität (Chief of the Admiralty), requested a series of design proposals, which ranged in size from small 2,500 t (2,461-long-ton) coastal defense ships to heavily armed 10,000 t (9,800-long-ton) ocean-going battleships. Caprivi ordered ten coastal defense ships to guard the entrances to the canal, since even opponents of the navy in the Reichstag (Imperial Diet) agreed that such vessels were necessary. The first six of these, the Siegfried class, were based on the smallest proposal. They carried their armament in an unusual layout, with two heavy guns forward that could be independently aimed; tactical doctrine of the day envisioned the ships breaking through an enemy line of battle (as the Austrians had done at the Battle of Lissa in 1866), and the arrangement would have allowed each ship to engage multiple targets.

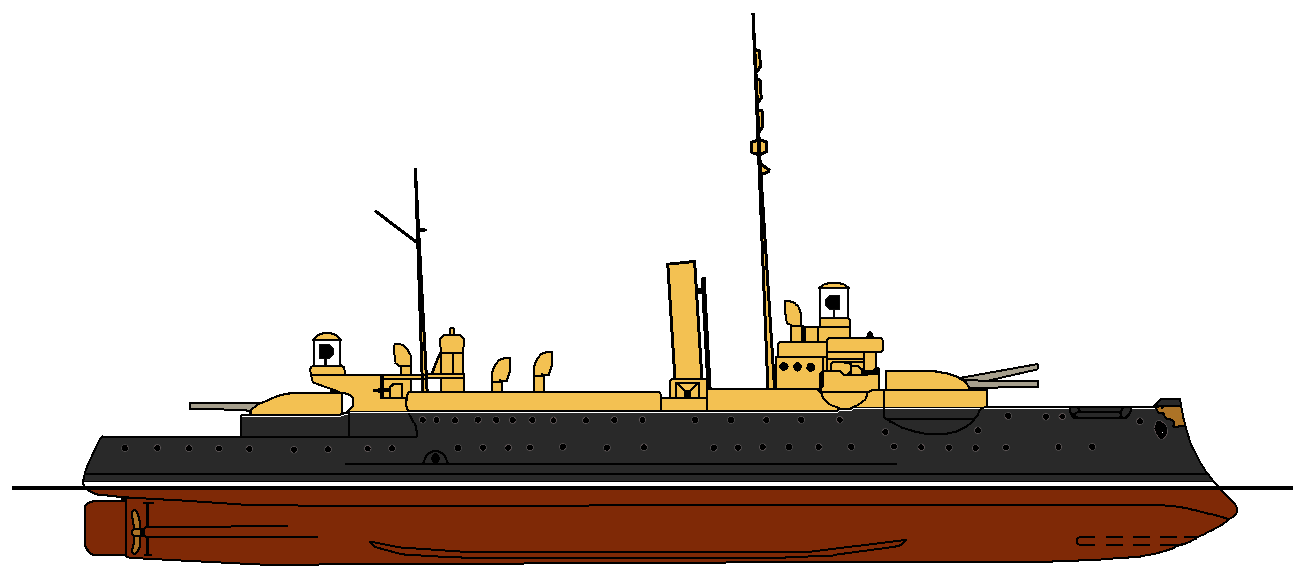
Profile drawing of Siegfried as originally configured

Siegfried was 79 meters (259 ft) long overall and had a beam of 14.90 m (48.9 ft) and a maximum draft of 5.74 m (18.8 ft). She displaced 3,500 t (3,400 long tons) normally and up to 3,741 t (3,682 long tons) at full load. Her hull had a long forecastle deck that extended most of the vessel's length. She was also fitted with a pronounced ram bow. Siegfried had a crew of 20 officers and 256 enlisted men.

Her propulsion system consisted of two vertical 3-cylinder triple-expansion engines, each driving a screw propeller, making her the first major German warship to be powered by triple-expansion machinery. Steam for the engines was provided by four coal-fired fire-tube boilers that were vented through a single funnel. The ship's propulsion system provided a top speed of 14.9 knots (27.6 km/h; 17.1 mph) from 4,800 metric horsepower (3,500 kW) and a range of approximately 1,490 nautical miles (2,760 km; 1,710 mi) at 10 knots (19 km/h; 12 mph).

The ship was armed with a main battery of three 24 cm (9.4 in) K L/35 guns mounted in three single gun turrets. Two were placed side by side forward, and the third was located aft of the main superstructure. They were supplied with a total of 204 rounds of ammunition. For defense against torpedo boats, the ship was also equipped with a secondary battery of six 8.8 cm (3.5 in) SK L/30 guns in single mounts. Siegfried also carried four 35 cm (13.8 in) torpedo tubes, all in swivel mounts on the deck. One was at the bow, another at the stern, and two amidships. The ship was protected by an armored belt that was 240 mm (9.4 in) in the central citadel, and an armored deck that was 30 mm (1.2 in) thick. The conning tower had 80 mm (3.1 in) thick sides.

=== Modifications ===
In 1897, the ship had her anti-torpedo nets removed. Siegfried was extensively rebuilt between 1903 and 1904 in an attempt to improve her usefulness. The ship was lengthened to 86.13 m (282.6 ft), which increased displacement to 4,237 t (4,170 long tons; 4,670 short tons) at full load. The lengthened hull space was used to install additional boilers; her old fire-tube boilers were replaced with more efficient water-tube boilers, and a second funnel was added. The performance of her propulsion machinery increased to 15.3 knots (28.3 km/h; 17.6 mph) from 4,724 metric horsepower (3,474 kW), with a maximum range of 3,400 nmi (6,300 km; 3,900 mi) at 10 knots. Her secondary battery was increased to ten 8.8 cm guns, and the 35 cm torpedo tubes were replaced with three 45 cm (17.7 in) tubes. Her crew increased to 20 officers and 287 enlisted men. Work was completed by 1900.

== Service history ==
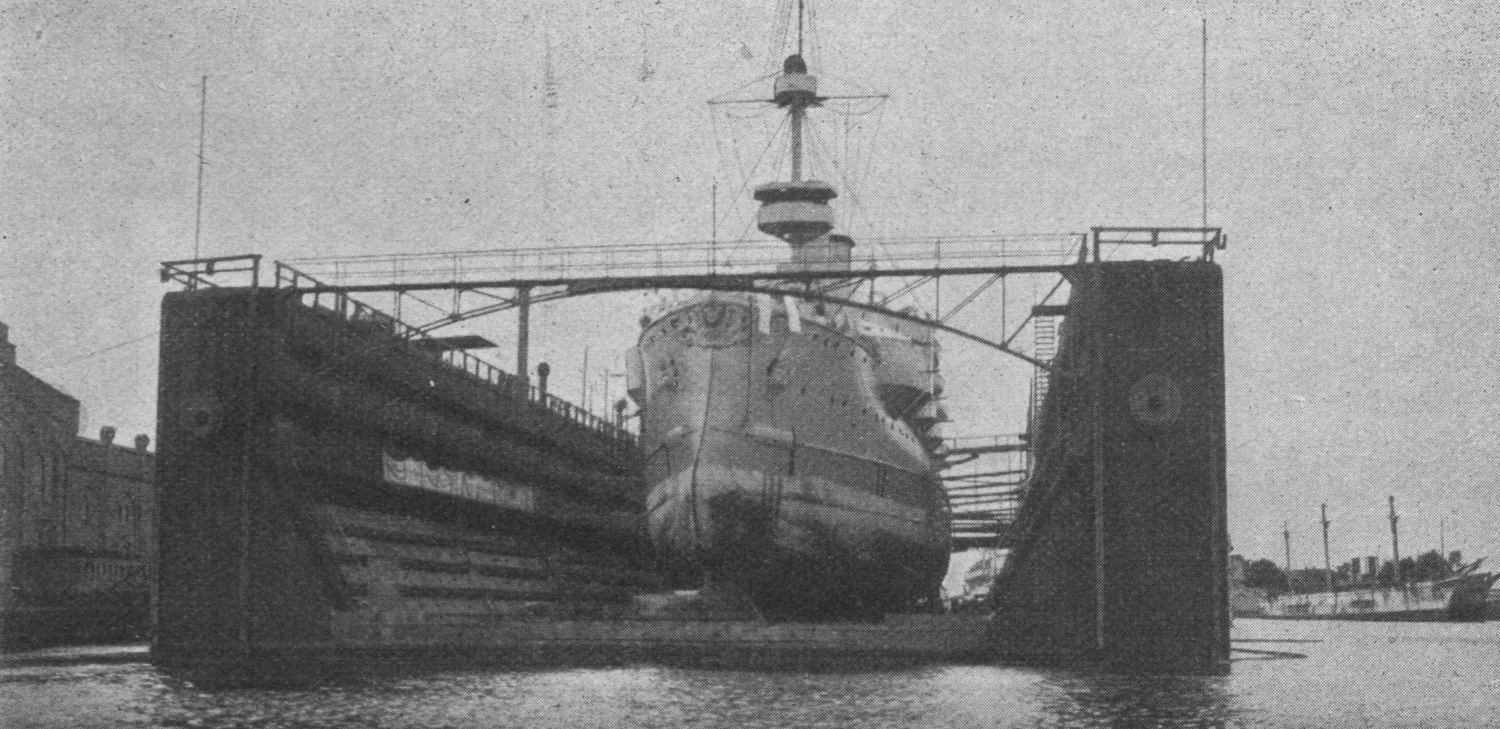
Siegfried in drydock in Danzig

=== Peacetime career ===
Siegfried, named for the eponymous hero of Germanic legend, was laid down in 1888 at the Germaniawerft shipyard in Kiel under the provisional designation "O". (Note: German warships were ordered under provisional names. Additions to the fleet were given a single letter; ships intended to replace older or lost vessels were ordered as "Ersatz (name of the ship to be replaced)".) She was launched on 10 August 1889, and completed on 19 April 1890. She was commissioned into the fleet on 29 April, under the command of Kapitän zur See (KzS–Captain at Sea) Paul Hoffmann, and began sea trials, which concluded on 3 October; at that point, Hoffmann left the ship and the vessel was decommissioned. On 16 April 1891, she was recommissioned under the command of KzS Alfred Herz, and she joined I Division of the Maneuver Squadron, replacing the older ironclad Württemberg. At that time, the unit also included the ironclads Baden, Bayern, and Oldenburg, under the command of Vizeadmiral (Vice Admiral) Karl Deinhard. I Division participated in several fleet maneuvers in 1891, where they typically served as the German side in the war games. In October, Korvettenkapitän (KK—Corvette Captain) Louis Riedel relieved Herz as the ship's captain.

The unit remained in service through the end of the year and into 1892; this was the first time the German fleet remained in commission through the winter. During this period, between operations with the squadron, Siegfried served as a guard ship based in Wilhelmshaven on the North Sea coast. On 18 March 1892, the main steam pipe in her aft boiler room burst, scalding several men with heated steam; five men were killed in the accident, and the ship was forced to return to port for repairs. That month, KK August Gruner replaced Riedel. Siegfried was ready to return to service by mid-June, and on the 29th, she escorted Kaiser Wilhelm II aboard his yacht Hohenzollern on a voyage from Kiel to Norway and then back to Wilhelmshaven. For the next few months, she resumed guard ship duties in Wilhelmshaven, until the annual fleet maneuvers that began in late August. She was assigned to the fleet reconnaissance force for the exercises, which were conducted in the Baltic Sea and concluded in late September. Siegfried then underwent an overhaul before returning to the Maneuver Squadron, now part of II Division, where she replaced the elderly ironclad Kronprinz.

Siegfried early in her career

Over the winter of 1892–1893, Siegfried and Beowulf joined the elderly ironclads König Wilhelm and Deutschland for a winter training cruise in the Mediterranean Sea. After returning to Germany, Siegfried was decommissioned in Wilhelmshaven for repairs on 23 February. As a result, she was unavailable for the maneuvers that year, her place in the division having been taken by her sister Frithjof. The ship remained out of service for the next two years, and in early 1895, she was assigned to the Reserve Division of the North Sea. Beginning on 9 July, she filled the role of the deputy commander flagship, briefly under the command of KK Karl Ascher, though later in July, he was relieved by KK Louis Fischer. The unit was allocated to the training fleet for the annual maneuvers on 1 August, and following their conclusion in September, the ships returned to Wilhelmshaven on 24 September. There, she was laid up with a reduced crew.

The year 1896 followed much the same pattern as previous years, with the normal peacetime routine of training cruises and maneuvers. She returned to active service that year in April, under the command of KK Eugen Kalau vom Hofe, though he was relieved by KK Carl Derzewski in May, who was in turn replaced by KK August von Dassel in June. Over the summer, the Germans instituted a policy that required senior officers in other posts to undergo command training aboard the ships of the reserve divisions. Kalau vom Hofe returned to the ship in August for the annual maneuvers, after which the ship was again temporarily laid up with a reduced crew. Derzewski recommissioned the ship in October. Siegfried's activities in 1897 followed a similar pattern, and that year, the ships in the reserve divisions were allowed to stop in foreign ports during their training cruises, a measure taken primarily to improve morale. During the fleet maneuvers that year, she was assigned to III Division of the fleet, along with all five of her sisters. Following the conclusion of the maneuvers, the ship was decommissioned on 29 September. At the end of the year, Siegfried had her anti-torpedo nets removed.

She spent much of the next five years out of commission, being reactivated only to participate in the annual fleet maneuvers in 1899, 1900, and 1901 as part of II Battle Squadron each time. Fregattenkapitän (Frigate Captain) August von Heeringen commanded the ship during her 1899 activation. From late 1900, she was assigned to the Reserve Division of the Baltic Sea, which was based in Danzig. In mid-1902, Siegfried was taken into drydock at the Kaiserliche Werft (Imperial Shipyard) in Danzig for an extensive reconstruction. Work was completed by early 1903, when she was returned to the Reserve Division of the Baltic Sea. She remained there, out of commission, for the next ten years, being reactivated only once in 1909 for the annual maneuvers under the command of KzS Maximilian Rogge.

=== World War I ===
An unidentified member of the Siegfried or Odin class on patrol during World War I, c. 1915

After the start of World War I in July 1914, Siegfried was mobilized along with her sisters and the two Odin-class coastal defense ships to serve in VI Battle Squadron. Siegfried was recommissioned on 12 August under the command of KzS Hans Bene, and after the ships completed preparations, deployed to guard Germany's North Sea coast in September. Siegfried and the other ships were dispersed between Jade Bay, where Wilhelmshaven lay, and the mouth of the Weser river; over the following months, the ships alternated between both locations. On 31 August 1915, VI Squadron was disbanded, but Siegfried remained on station in the Jade and Weser, now assigned to the local harbor defense flotillas. This service concluded on 30 December, when Siegfried was withdrawn from patrol duties. She was detached from the harbor flotillas on 5 January 1916 and was thereafter sent to Wilhelmshaven, where she was decommissioned on 14 January.

Siegfried was initially allocated to the material reserve in the event that the navy might need to reactivate her, but on 1 January 1917, she was reduced to a barracks ship in Wilhelmshaven, used to support II Seaman Division. On 12 November, she was transferred to Emden, where she supported IV U-boat Flotilla as a tender. From 11 February 1918, the ship was used to support the patrol flotilla stationed in the mouth of the Ems; she filled this role until Germany's defeat in November. On 17 June 1919, she was stricken from the naval register. The navy planned to convert her into a salvage ship, but the plan was abandoned and she was instead sold for 425,000 marks to H. Peters in Wewelsfleth. Siegfried was broken up for scrap the following year in Kiel-Nordmole.
