= SMS Frithjof =

Coastal defense ship of the German Imperial Navy

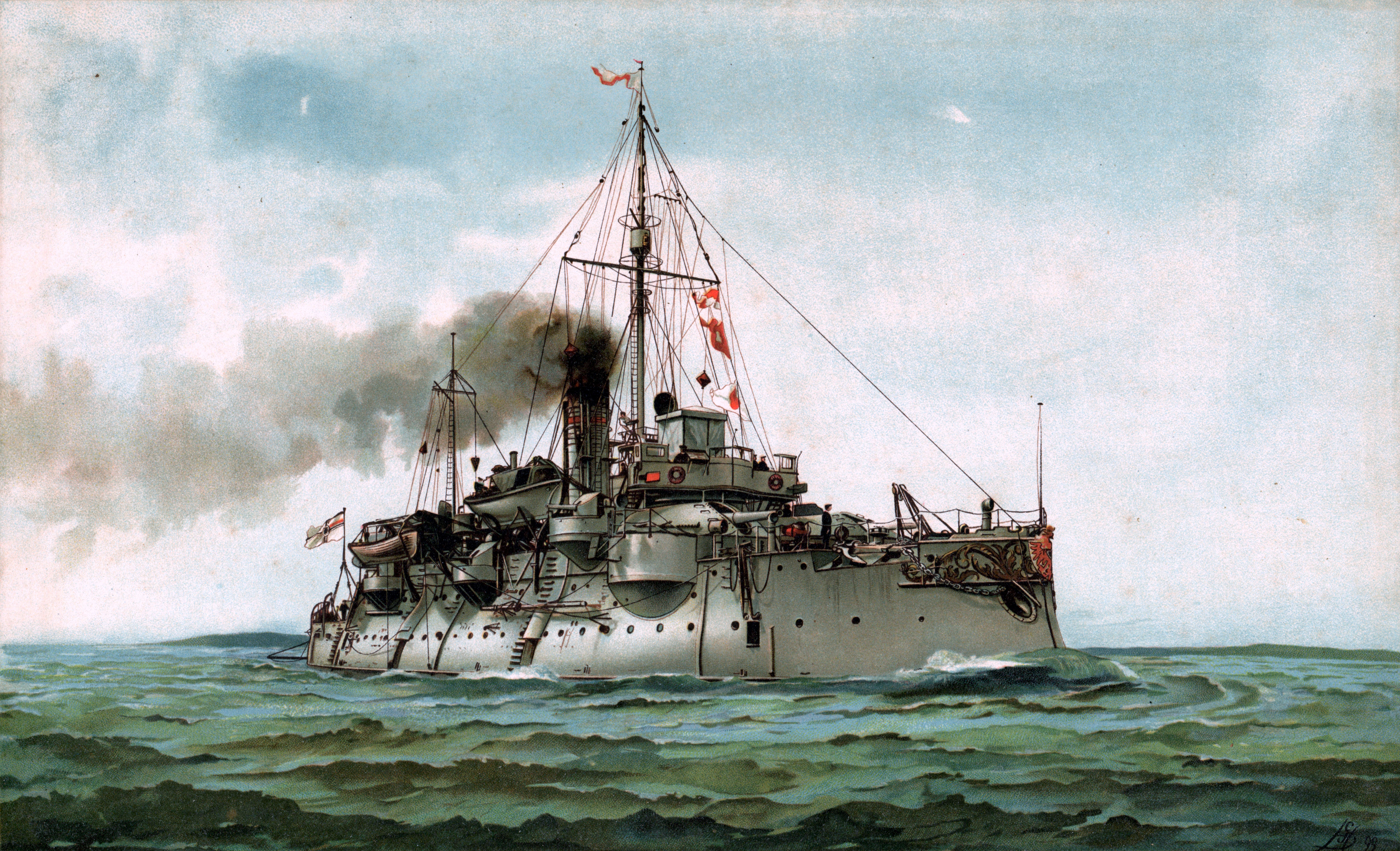
- Lithograph of Frithjof in 1902

History

German Empire
- Name: Frithjof
- Namesake: Frithjof
- Builder: AG Weser, Bremen
- Laid down: February 1890
- Launched: 21 July 1891
- Commissioned: 23 February 1893
- Decommissioned: 31 August 1915
- Stricken: 17 June 1919
- Fate: Rebuilt as merchant ship, 1923; scrapped at Danzig, 1930

General characteristics
- Class & type: Siegfried-class coast defense ship
- Displacement: Normal: 3,500 t (3,400 long tons); Full load: 3,741 t (3,682 long tons)
- Length: 79 m (259 ft 2 in)
- Beam: 14.90 m (48 ft 11 in)
- Draft: 5.74 m (18.8 ft)
- Installed power: 4 × fire-tube boilers; 4,800 PS (3,500 kW)
- Propulsion: 2 × triple-expansion steam engines; 2 × screw propellers
- Speed: 15 knots (28 km/h; 17 mph)
- Range: 4,800 nmi (8,900 km; 5,500 mi) at 10 knots (19 km/h; 12 mph)
- Complement: 20 officers; 256 enlisted men
- Armament: 3 × 24 cm (9.4 in) guns; 8 × 8.8 cm (3.5 in) guns; 4 × 35 cm (13.8 in) torpedo tubes
- Armor: Waterline belt: 240 mm (9.4 in); Deck: 30 mm (1.2 in); Conning tower: 80 mm (3.1 in)

SMS Frithjof was the third vessel of the six-member Siegfried class of coastal defense ships (Küstenpanzerschiffe) built for the German Imperial Navy. Her sister ships were Siegfried, Beowulf, Heimdall, Hildebrand, and Hagen. Frithjof was built by the AG Weser shipyard between 1890 and 1893, and was armed with a main battery of three 24-centimeter (9.4 in) guns. She served in the German fleet throughout the 1890s and was rebuilt in 1900 - 1902. She served in the VI Battle Squadron after the outbreak of World War I in August 1914, but saw no action. Frithjof was demobilized in 1915 and used as a barracks ship thereafter. She was rebuilt as a merchant ship in 1923 and served in this capacity until she was broken up for scrap in 1930.

== Design ==
In the late 1880s, the German Kaiserliche Marine (Imperial Navy) grappled with the problem of what type of capital ship to build in the face of limited naval budgets (owing to parliamentary objections to naval spending and the cost of dredging the Kaiser Wilhelm Canal). General Leo von Caprivi, the new Chef der Admiralität (Chief of the Admiralty), requested a series of design proposals, which ranged in size from small 2,500 t (2,461-long-ton) coastal defense ships to heavily armed 10,000 t (9,800-long-ton) ocean-going battleships. Caprivi ordered ten coastal defense ships to guard the entrances to the canal, since even opponents of the navy in the Reichstag (Imperial Diet) agreed that such vessels were necessary. The first six of these, the Siegfried class, were based on the smallest proposal. They carried their armament in an unusual layout, with two heavy guns forward that could be independently aimed; tactical doctrine of the day envisioned the ships breaking through an enemy line of battle (as the Austrians had done at the Battle of Lissa in 1866), and the arrangement would have allowed each ship to engage multiple targets.

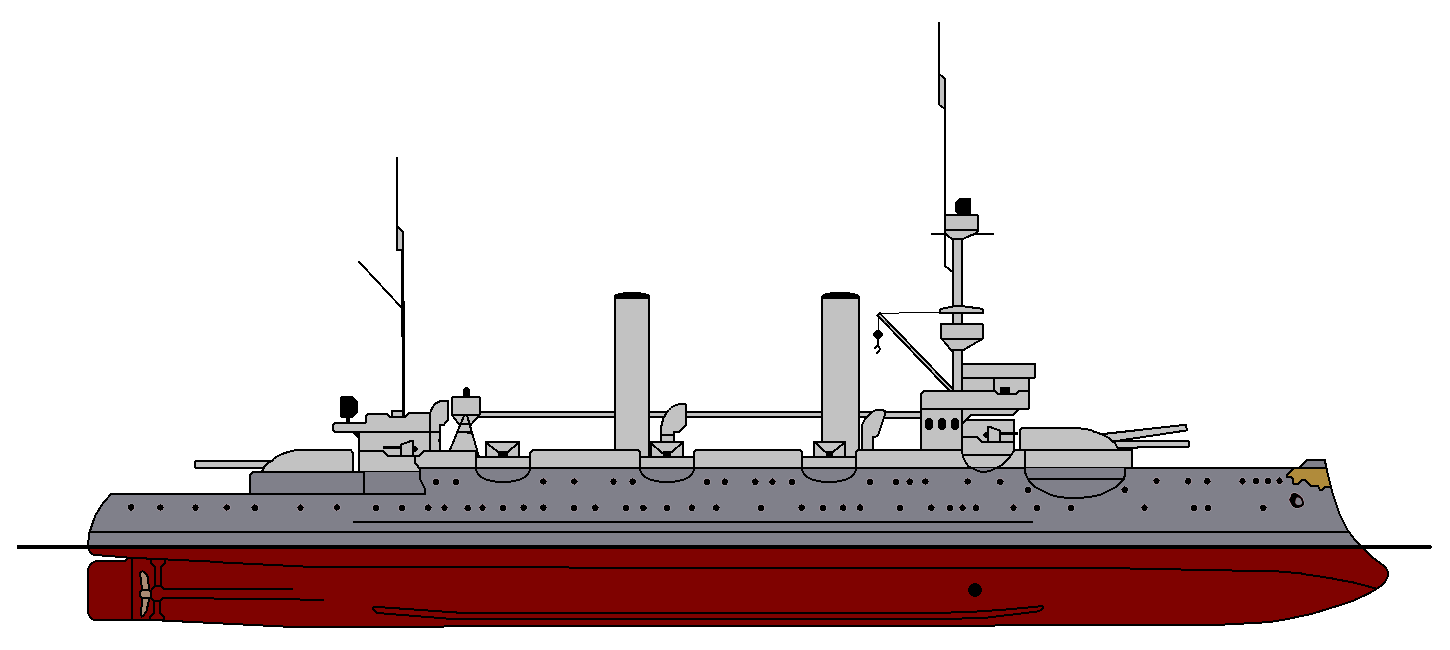
Profile drawing of Hagen in 1910

Frithjof was 79 meters (259 ft) long overall and had a beam of 14.90 m (48.9 ft) and a maximum draft of 5.74 m (18.8 ft). She displaced 3,500 t (3,400 long tons) normally and up to 3,741 t (3,682 long tons) at full load. Her hull had a long forecastle deck that extended most of the vessel's length. She was also fitted with a pronounced ram bow. Frithjof had a crew of 20 officers and 256 enlisted men.

Her propulsion system consisted of two vertical 3-cylinder triple-expansion engines, each driving a screw propeller. Steam for the engines was provided by four coal-fired fire-tube boilers that were vented through a single funnel. The ship's propulsion system provided a top speed of 15 knots (28 km/h; 17 mph) from 4,800 metric horsepower (3,500 kW) and a range of approximately 1,490 nautical miles (2,760 km; 1,710 mi) at 10 knots (19 km/h; 12 mph).

The ship was armed with a main battery of three 24 cm (9.4 in) K L/35 guns mounted in three single gun turrets. Two were placed side by side forward, and the third was located aft of the main superstructure. They were supplied with a total of 204 rounds of ammunition. For defense against torpedo boats, the ship was also equipped with a secondary battery of eight 8.8 cm (3.5 in) SK L/30 guns in single mounts. Frithjof also carried four 35 cm (13.8 in) torpedo tubes, all in swivel mounts on the deck. One was at the bow, another at the stern, and two amidships. The ship was protected by an armored belt that was 240 mm (9.4 in) in the central citadel, and an armored deck that was 30 mm (1.2 in) thick. The conning tower had 80 mm (3.1 in) thick sides.

=== Modifications ===
In 1897, the ship had her anti-torpedo nets removed. Frithjof was extensively rebuilt between 1902 and 1903 in an attempt to improve her usefulness. The ship was lengthened to 86.13 m (282.6 ft), which increased displacement to 4,367 t (4,298 long tons; 4,814 short tons) at full load. The lengthened hull space was used to install additional boilers; her old fire-tube boilers were replaced with more efficient water-tube boilers, and a second funnel was added. The performance of her propulsion machinery increased to 15 knots (28 km/h; 17 mph) from 5,023 metric horsepower (3,694 kW), with a maximum range of 3,400 nmi (6,300 km; 3,900 mi) at 10 knots. Her secondary battery was increased to ten 8.8 cm guns, and the 35 cm torpedo tubes were replaced with three 45 cm (17.7 in) tubes. Her crew increased to 20 officers and 287 enlisted men. Work was completed by 1900.

== Service history ==
=== Construction – 1898 ===
Frithjof in port early in her career

Named for the titular hero of Frithjof's Saga, Frithjof was laid down in February 1890 at the AG Weser shipyard in Bremen under the provisional name "Q". (Note: German warships were ordered under provisional names. Additions to the fleet were given a single letter; ships intended to replace older or lost vessels were ordered as "Ersatz (name of the ship to be replaced)".) She was launched on 21 July 1891, and Vizeadmiral (Vice Admiral) Wilhelm Schröder christened the ship at the ceremony. The ship was completed in November 1892 and began sea trials before being formally commissioned in Wilhelmshaven on 23 February 1893, under the command of Korvettenkapitän (KK—Corvette Captain) August Gruner. She was assigned to II Division of the Maneuver Fleet, though she was still completing her trials, which prevented her from joining the unit for training exercises in March. She took part in the large-scale fleet maneuvers held in August and September, along with her sister ship Beowulf. These maneuvers were divided into two phases. During the first, Frithjof and the other capital ships performed as the hostile French fleet, which was "attacked" by torpedo boats in the North Sea. The second set of maneuvers took place in the Baltic Sea, and Frithjof and the ironclads again simulated a French fleet. Frithjof thereafter became the flagship of the Reserve Division of the North Sea on 1 October.

In February 1894, Frithjof had her crew reduced while in reserve and she was allocated as a tender under the command of Kapitänleutnant (Captain Lieutenant) Ludwig Bruch, though this was only a temporary measure. In April her crew was replenished to allow the ship to take part in training maneuvers with the rest of II Division; at that time, KK August Carl Thiele relieved Bruch. Later in the year, the unit also cruised with the rest of the fleet in the North and Baltic Seas. Through this period, the ship came under a series of captains, including KK Oelrichs from May to June, then KK Hermann da Fonseca-Wollheim from June to July. Thiele returned to the vessel in July. The annual fleet maneuvers followed in August and September; during these, Frithjof was assigned to the temporary II Battle Squadron until 29 September, when the unit was disbanded. Frithjof then went to Wilhelmshaven, where she was placed back in reserve with a reduced crew, once again under Bruch's command.

The year 1895 followed the same pattern as before, after the ship's crew was replenished in March under the command of KK Georg Alexander von Müller. Divisional exercises took place in the middle of the year, followed by fleet maneuvers in August and September. The normal peacetime training routine was interrupted in June by the opening of the Kaiser Wilhelm Canal, which was marked with a large naval review. Her crew was reduced once again in July, with the ship again under Bruch's command, though she was reactivated the following month under Oelrich. Frithjof's activity in 1896 repeated that of previous years, with KK Carl Derzewski in command, though on 14 November she resumed her role as the Reserve Division flagship. At that time, KK August von Heeringen relieved Derzewksi. The next two years passed similarly uneventfully beyond the normal training routine; the only event of note during this period was a cruise to Norway in 1898. During this period, KK Alfred Ehrlich commanded the ship from October 1897 to October 1898, at which point KK Eugen Kalau vom Hofe relieved him.

=== 1899–1914 ===
Frithjof, c. 1898, in Kiel

In June 1899, Frithjof made a lengthy visit to Copenhagen, Denmark, in addition to her normal training activities. That year, she and her sisters were assigned to II Squadron once again for the annual maneuvers. Kalau vom Hofe thereafter left the ship, being replaced by KK Gildemeister. The ship relinquished flagship duties in 1900, and was decommissioned that year. A lengthy reconstruction began at the Kaiserliche Werft (Imperial Shipyard) in Kiel in early 1902. Work was completed by September 1903, and she was recommissioned on the 29th of the month under the command of KK Johannes Recke. After completing sea trials, Frithjof joined II Squadron of what was now designated the Active Battle Fleet.

In 1904, she took part in a fleet cruise to the Shetland Islands and Norway. After the fleet maneuvers ended in September, Frithjof was transferred to the Reserve Squadron and allocated to the Naval Artillery Inspectorate for use as a training ship. She joined the ships of the Training Unit for maneuvers in the Baltic from mid-May to early June 1905. In July, she and the coastal defense ship Ägir conducted experiments with equipment to measure weather and air currents. The ship's activity for the year concluded with the annual fleet maneuvers; KK Max Witschel thereafter took command of the vessel. Frithjof then went to Neufahrwassar on 9 October. In 1906, Frithjof followed a similar routine to the previous year, operating with the Training Unit in the Baltic and North Seas and then with the combined fleet in August and September. During this period, KK Siegfried von Jachmann served as the ship's captain.

The ship joined Ägir and the light cruiser Nymphe for training exercises in Danzig Bay in January 1907. Frithjof then conducted individual training in February and March, before resuming operations with the Training Unit in the Baltic. Later in the summer, Frithjof and Ägir resumed training activities before the fleet exercises. That year, the ship was assigned to the newly formed III Battle Squadron. During the maneuvers, Frithjof lightly rammed Nymphe but did not cause serious damage. After the maneuvers, KK Carl Hollweg relieved Jachmann. Further exercises took place later in the year, concluding on 27 November. The year 1908 passed quietly for Frithjof; in September, after the annual maneuvers, KK Ferdinand Bertram replaced Hollweg. Frithjof conducted the same pattern of exercises with the Training Unit and the rest of the fleet in 1909 until the end of the annual maneuvers on 15 September. At that time, Frithjof and the rest of the coastal defense ships were decommissioned for the last time before the start of World War I.

=== World War I ===
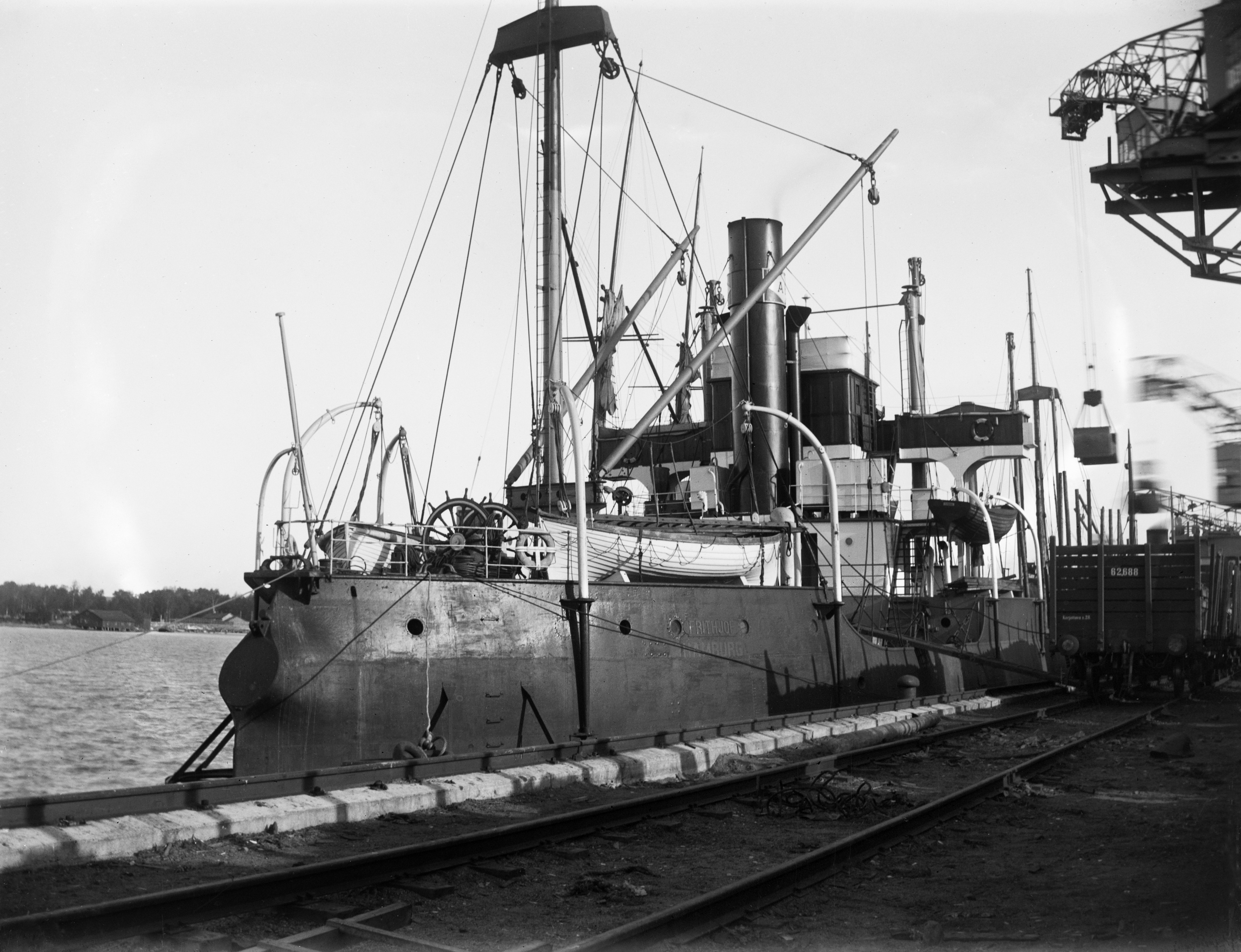
Frithjof, converted to a merchant vessel, docked at Länsisatama in Helsinki, Finland in the mid-1920s

Following the outbreak of war in July 1914, Frithjof was recommissioned on 12 August under the command of Fregattenkapitän (Frigate Captain) von Lessel. After the ships were prepared for operations, they were deployed to Germany's North Sea coast on 14 September; five days later, Frithjof was stationed in the mouth of the Ems, where Lessel took command of the local defense forces. At that time, Ägir was also present, along with an auxiliary minelayer unit and several small support vessels. She remained on station there through 1915, though in June she was joined by Heimdall, whose commander outranked Lessel and therefore replaced him as the local commander. Frithjof continued to operate in the Ems after VI Squadron was disbanded on 31 August. She nevertheless saw no action during this period.

On 5 January 1916, Frithjof was released from coastal defense duties and was sent to Kiel. From there, she proceeded to Danzig in company with Hildebrand and Odin on 10 January, where she was decommissioned six days later. She was then allocated to the U-boat Inspectorate for use as a barracks ship for U-boat crews stationed in Danzig, a role she filled for the rest of the war. Following Germany's defeat in November 1918, she was struck from the naval register on 17 June 1919. She was sold to the Arnold Bernstein Shipping Company of Hamburg. Frithjof was rebuilt as a merchant ship in 1923 at Deutsche Werke. All of her armor plate, guns, and superstructure were removed, and her engines were replaced with a pair of smaller U-boat engines with 550 metric horsepower (400 kW). A new superstructure more suited to a merchant vessel was erected and space in the hull for cargo was cleared. Still under the name Frithjof, she only served in this capacity for seven years, and was dismantled for scrap in Danzig in 1930.
