= Siegfried-class coastal defense ship =

Coastal defense ship class of the German Imperial Navy

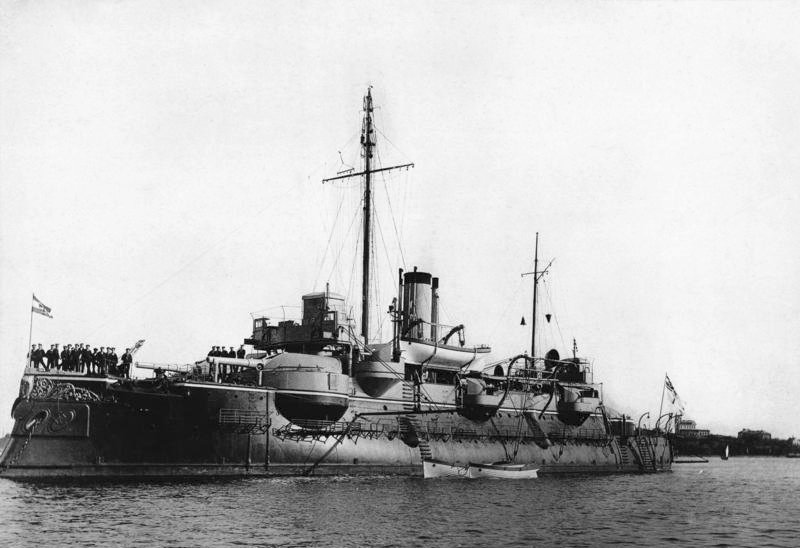
- SMS Beowulf

Class overview
- Name: Siegfried class
- Builders: AG Weser (2); Kaiserliche Werft Kiel (2); Friedrich Krupp Germaniawerft (1); Kaiserliche Werft Wilhelmshaven (1)
- Operators: Imperial German Navy
- Preceded by: Oldenburg (unique)
- Succeeded by: Odin class
- Built: 1888–1894
- In commission: 1890–1919
- Completed: 6
- Lost: 1
- Scrapped: 5

General characteristics (as built)
- Type: Coast defense ship
- Displacement: 3,500 metric tons (3,400 long tons)
- Length: 76.40 m (250 ft 8 in) waterline; 79 m (259 ft 2 in) overall
- Beam: 14.90 m (48 ft 11 in)
- Draft: 5.74 m (18.8 ft)
- Installed power: 4 locomotive boilers; 4,800 PS (3,500 kW)
- Propulsion: 2 × triple-expansion steam engines; 2 × screw propellers
- Speed: 14 knots (26 km/h; 16 mph)
- Range: 4,800 nmi (8,900 km; 5,500 mi) at 15 knots (28 km/h; 17 mph)
- Complement: 276
- Armament: 3 × 1 – 24 cm (9.4 in) guns; 8 × 1 – 8.8 cm (3.5 in) guns; 4 × 35 cm (13.8 in) torpedo tubes
- Armor: Waterline belt: 180–240 mm (7.1–9.4 in); Deck: 30 mm (1.2 in); Gun turrets: 200 mm (7.9 in); Barbettes: 200 mm (7.9 in); Conning tower: 180 mm (7.1 in)

The Siegfried class was a group of six coastal defense ships built by the German Kaiserliche Marine ("Imperial Navy") in the late 19th century. The ships were intended to protect the German coastline from naval attacks. The class comprised the lead ship Siegfried, along with her sisters Beowulf, Frithjof, Heimdall, Hildebrand, and Hagen. All six ships were named after Norse mythological figures. Two further vessels, the Odin class, were built to a similar design but were not identical.

The Siegfried-class ships were obsolete by the outbreak of World War I, and saw only limited service in their intended role before they were withdrawn from active duty. The ships then served in a variety of secondary duties, including barracks ships, target ships, and in the case of Beowulf, an icebreaker in the Baltic Sea. All six ships were struck from the naval register on 17 June 1919, days before the Treaty of Versailles was signed. Five of the ships were sold for scrapping immediately after they were struck from the register (with Hildebrand being lost in transit), but Frithjof was purchased by a shipping company, and converted into a freighter. She served in this capacity until she too was scrapped in 1930.

== Background ==
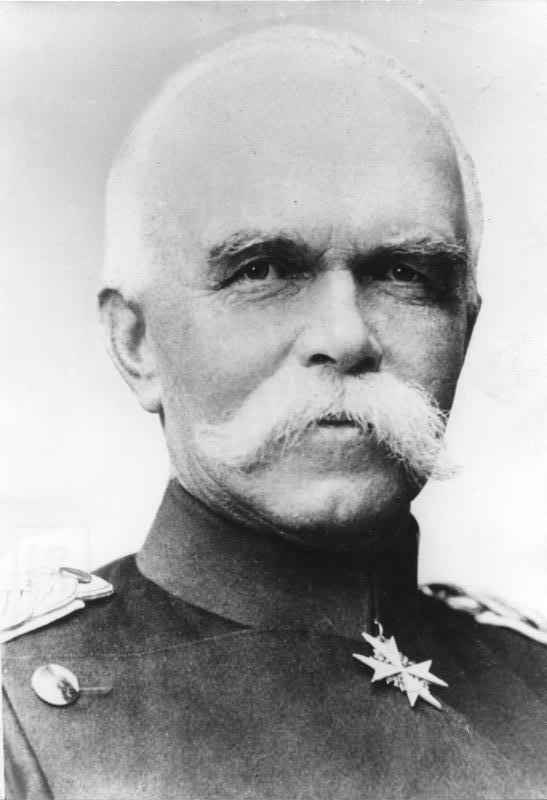
Leo von Caprivi, the Chef der Admiralität (Chief of the Admiralty) during the 1880s

In 1883, Albrecht von Stosch, the Chef der Admiralität (Chief of the Admiralty) of the German Kaiserliche Marine (Imperial Navy), resigned. He was replaced by General Leo von Caprivi, an army officer with little experience in naval matters. He inherited from Stosch a naval construction program outlined in 1873 that stated the fleet's requirements to be fourteen sea-going ironclad warships, along with seven monitors and two floating batteries, among other cruising vessels and other, smaller ship types. By that time, the fleet had acquired thirteen of the large ironclads (the fourteenth, the ironclad Grosser Kurfürst, having sunk in an accidental collision in 1878), but none of the monitors or floating batteries.

Caprivi faced a number of obstacles to any new capital ship construction. The loss of Grosser Kurfürst generated considerable displeasure in the Reichstag (Imperial Diet), and thus resistance to expensive naval projects. The general consensus for the expected service life of existing capital ships was thirty years, which meant that even the oldest ironclads that had been built in the 1860s could not be replaced before the mid-1890s. Lastly, the 1880s was characterized by general confusion amongst naval experts in all navies. The question of tactics in the ironclad age had not been settled, and end-on ramming attacks (as had been done successfully at the Battle of Lissa in 1866) required a heavy forward-firing armament, while the traditional line of battle emphasized heavy broadside firepower. For his part, Caprivi also vacillated between viewing the navy as critical to Germany's value as a potential ally to another power, and seeing it as a potentially unnecessary drain on resources that would be better used by the army.

To address these issues, Caprivi established the Admiralitätsrat (Admiralty Council) in January 1884, which included a number of experienced naval officers. He ordered Konteradmiral (Rear Admiral) Max von der Goltz to begin investigating the characteristics that best suited a new ironclad for the needs of the German fleet. Goltz prepared a survey for the navy's design departments for basic parameters such as the optimal top speed, the most effective armament, and size constraints of the existing naval infrastructure. In the meantime, in his first memorandum to the Reichstag in late 1884, he assured the deputies that he would not request funding for new capital ships for at least three or four years. Instead, he requested only limited funding for modernization of existing vessels to make them more effective.

Goltz, who was appointed as the "Head of the Naval Department", organized a series of meetings to determine the requirements for the next class of capital ships. During one such meeting in October 1885, the members agreed to a set of specifications, including an armament of four 30.5 cm (12 in) guns, six torpedo tubes, a maximum speed of 15 knots (28 km/h; 17 mph), and draft low enough to allow passage through the confined waters between Denmark and Sweden. The latter requirement was specified due to fears of a future war with Denmark, which the planners viewed as a possibility owing to Denmark's defeat in the Second Schleswig War in 1864. Additionally, displacement was limited to a maximum of 8,400 metric tons (8,300 long tons; 9,300 short tons).

By March 1886, the chief naval designer, Alfred Dietrich, had completed a broad design study titled "Memorandum on the Construction of Armorclads", which included series of general proposals for vessels of varying sizes and characteristics. Caprivi in turn requested more detailed proposals from the memorandum, including cost estimates, which Dietrich completed on 8 June. These ranged from a 10,000 t (9,842 long tons; 11,023 short tons) "heavy battleship" armed with seven 30.5 cm (12 in) guns, which cost 10 million marks, down to a small coastal defense ship armed with a pair of 21 cm (8.3 in) guns and displacing just 2,500 t (2,461 long tons; 2,756 short tons), which cost 3.92 million marks. The price of the new ships was at the forefront of Caprivi's considerations, as the Reichstag was opposed to increases in naval spending and the cost of the impending construction of the Kaiser Wilhelm Canal loomed over future naval budgets. At the same time, increasing international tensions in the mid-1880s, due to the scramble for Africa and perennial conflicts between Greece and the Ottoman Empire, strengthened Caprivi's resolve to request funding for new capital ships by mid-1886.

Discussions had begun for the requested naval budget of the 1887–1888 fiscal year. Having been unable to secure parliamentary approval for naval increases for new vessels in previous years, Caprivi instead submitted a request for a large-scale program that included new battleships, cruisers, coastal defense ships, and torpedo boats. The Reichstag rejected almost all of his requested budget, allocating funds for only a single coastal defense ship, though Caprivi had asked for ten of the vessels, as this was the cheapest option available, and it was apparent that the canal would require local defenses once it was eventually completed.

== Development ==
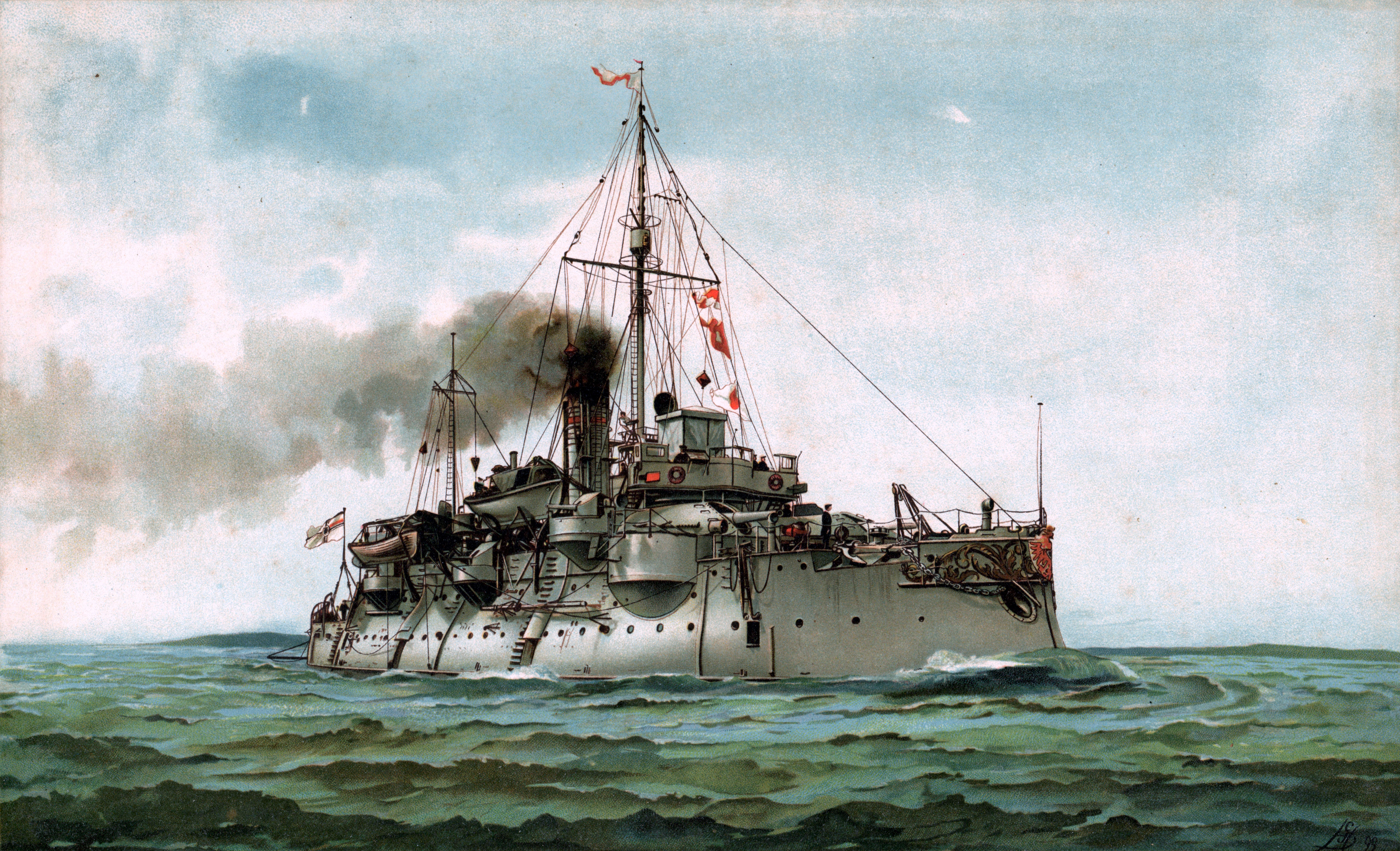
1902 lithograph of Frithjof

Dietrich's proposal for a 2,500-ton coastal defense ship from the 1886 memorandum was selected for development into the ship that was to be built. The vessel was to incorporate the following set of characteristics: a main battery of two 24 cm (9.4 in) guns supported by a secondary battery of six 37 mm (1.5 in) Hotchkiss revolver cannon; four torpedo tubes; a speed of 13.5 knots (25.0 km/h; 15.5 mph). This was to be achieved at a cost of 3.5 million marks. The two heavy guns were carried in open barbettes side-by-side forward, as German naval theorists still favored ramming attacks that required a capability for end-on fire. They carried the guns in individual barbette mounts that could be independently aimed, rather than a single rotating barbette as had been done with the Sachsen-class ironclads. In addition, the hull was given a pronounced tumblehome shape to provide as wide a field of fire as possible. German tactical doctrine envisioned the ships breaking through an enemy line of battle, and the arrangement would have allowed each ship to engage multiple targets.

Displacement quickly rose to 3,000 t (2,953 long tons; 3,307 short tons), which permitted the installation of a third 24 cm gun aft. The third gun was deemed necessary to improve the ability to fire astern if the ships were forced to retreat into the rivers near the ends of the canal. Weapons tests were held at the Krupp testing grounds at Meppen in 1888, using mock-ups of contemporary torpedo-boat designs. It was determined that the 37 mm Hotchkiss was unable to inflict serious damage at the expected battle range of 1,000 m (3,300 ft), and so the secondary battery was replaced with 8.7 cm (3.4 in) guns, though these had not performed entirely adequately in the tests either. The first vessel received six of the new guns, while all subsequent ships were fitted with eight. (Note: These new guns were originally referred to as 8.7 cm guns, but were later re-designated as 8.8 cm guns.)

As construction work on the initial vessels proceeded in the early 1890s, alterations to the program continued. Of the ten vessels initially requested and slowly approved, the last pair were removed from the building program. Vessels seven and eight were altered slightly, becoming the Odin class, which Dirk Nottelmann and David Sullivan refer to as "somewhat of a sub-class." The most radical proposal for the Odin class would have seen them rearmed with four 24 cm guns, but placed in a pair of twin-gun turrets, as German tactical doctrine had returned to the line of battle by that time, meaning that a heavier broadside of four guns was seen as more important than two guns able to fire ahead independently. Additional changes would have been made to the hull to compensate for the weight of the fourth gun, including the adoption of lighter Krupp armor instead of the old compound armor used in the earlier ships, but the plan came to nothing, and the two Odins were completed with the basic Siegfried layout.

== Design ==
=== General characteristics and machinery ===
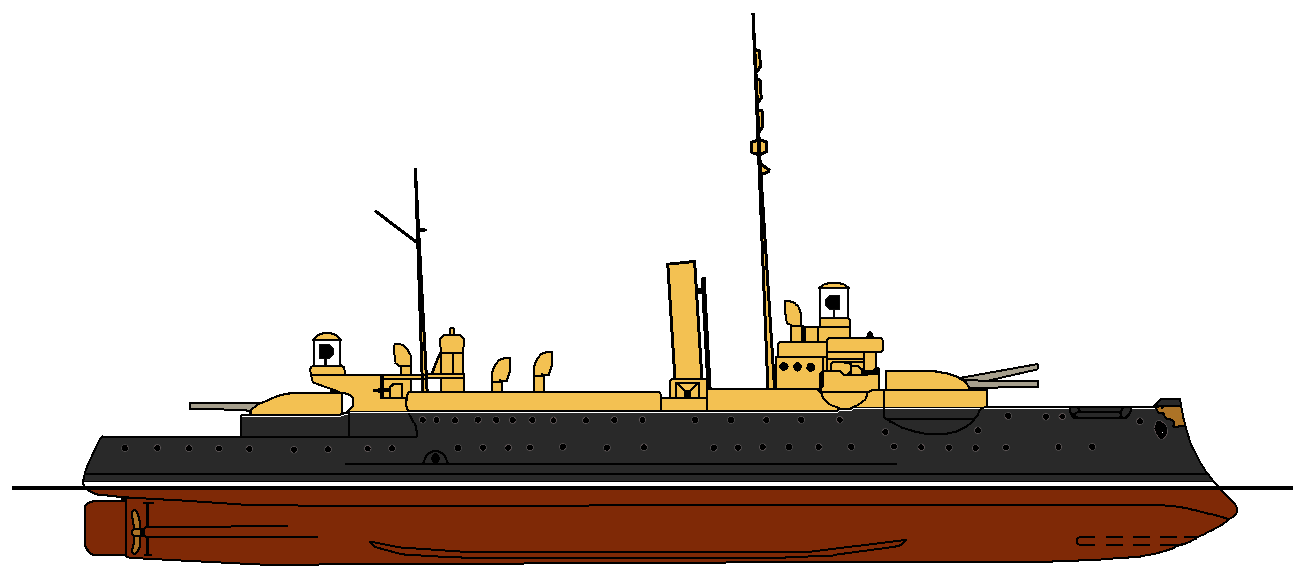
Illustration of Siegfried as originally configured

The ships of the Siegfried class were 76.40 meters (250 ft 8 in) long at the waterline and 79 m (259 ft 2 in) long overall. The ships had a beam of 14.90 m (48 ft 11 in) and a draft of between 5.51 m (18 ft 1 in) forward and 5.74 m (18 ft 10 in) aft. The ships had a designed displacement of 3,500 metric tons (3,400 long tons; 3,900 short tons), and a maximum displacement of 3,741 t (3,682 long tons). The ships used transverse and longitudinal steel frames in the hull. They had eight watertight compartments and a double bottom that ran for 60% of the hull. The hulls had a pronounced ram bow and tumblehome shape, and their upper deck extended from the bow to the main mast, where it stepped down one level. Their superstructures consisted of an armored conning tower forward and a smaller secondary platform further aft. Each ship was fitted with a pair of pole masts for signaling purposes.

The ships were described as good sea boats; they had gentle motion and were very responsive to commands from the helm. Steering was controlled via a single rudder. The ships lost significant speed in heavy seas, however, and suffered from severe weather helm. The ships had a crew of 20 officers and 256 enlisted men, with an additional 6 officers and 22 men when serving as a flagship. The ships carried a number of smaller boats, including one picket boat, one pinnace, two cutters, one yawl, and one dinghy.

The ships were powered by two sets of 3-cylinder triple-expansion engines, each in its own engine room. This was the first use of triple-expansion machinery in a major German warship. These engines drove a pair of three-bladed screws that were 3.50 m (11 ft 6 in) in diameter. The ships had eight marine type boilers, with the exception of Hagen, which was equipped with eight Thornycroft boilers. On all vessels, the boilers were vented through a single funnel located amidships. The ships' propulsion systems produced between 4,453 and 5,250 metric horsepower (3,275 and 3,861 kW), which produced top speeds of 14.6 and 15.1 knots (27.0 and 28.0 km/h; 16.8 and 17.4 mph); Beowulf was the fastest and Heimdall was the slowest. The ships stored up to 220 t (220 long tons; 240 short tons) of coal and 220 t (220 long tons; 240 short tons) of fuel oil, which enabled a range of 1,490 nautical miles (2,760 km; 1,710 mi) at a cruising speed of 10 knots (19 km/h; 12 mph). At 14 knots (26 km/h; 16 mph), the ships could only steam 740 nmi (1,370 km; 850 mi). Each ship had three electric generators that provided between 29–26 kilowatts at 67 volts.

=== Armament ===
Lithograph of Heimdall and Siegfried underway

The ships' primary armament consisted of three 24 cm K L/35 guns. These were placed in an unusual arrangement for such large guns, two of which were mounted in a pair of rotating barbettes forward side-by-side, while the third was mounted in a single barbette aft. The barbette mounts were the MPL C/88. Each gun had a range of elevation from -3 to +25 degrees, and at maximum elevation, the guns had a range of 13,000 m (43,000 ft). Ammunition storage amounted to 204 rounds, or 68 shells per gun. The ships were initially supplied with C/80 armor-piercing and common shells, which weighed 215 kg (474 lb); these were later replaced by 140 kg (310 lb) C/01 shells and eventually a C/01/07 semi-armor-piercing shell that weighed 146 kg (322 lb). Muzzle velocity for the guns was initially 580 m/s (1,900 ft/s), using the C/80 shell, but increased to 690 m/s (2,300 ft/s) with the C/01 and later variants.

For close-range defense against torpedo boats, the ships had a secondary battery of eight 8.8 SK L/30 guns with 1,500 rounds of ammunition, though Siegfried only had six of these guns. Their ammunition came in the form of a fixed cartridge that weighed 10.6 kg (23 lb). The 8.8 cm gun fired a 6.68 to 7 kg (14.7 to 15.4 lb) projectile (depending on the variant) at a muzzle velocity of 565 to 670 m/s (1,850 to 2,200 ft/s). At a maximum elevation of 20 degrees, the guns could engage targets out to 7,300 m (24,000 ft); the guns could be depressed to -10 degrees, since they were intended to engage targets at very close range.

The ships were also equipped with four 35 cm (14 in) torpedo tubes. One tube was mounted in the stern in an above-water swivel mount, two were placed laterally, also above water, and the fourth was in the bow. The torpedo tubes were supplied with a total of 10 torpedoes.

=== Armor ===
The ships' armor consisted of compound steel for the first three ships and Krupp armor for the last three, coupled with teak. The upper section of the main armored belt was 240 millimeters (9.4 in) thick in the central citadel of the ship and reduced to 180 mm (7.1 in) at either end. This was mounted on 330 mm (13 in) of timber. The lower section of the belt was 140 mm (5.5 in) thick in the central area, and 100 mm (3.9 in) on the bow and stern. This portion of the armored belt was mounted on 290 mm (11 in) of timber. The main armored deck was 30 mm (1.2 in) thick, though on Hagen and Heimdall this was increased to 50 mm (2.0 in). The conning tower had a roof that was 30 mm (1.2 in) thick and sides that were 80 mm (3.1 in) thick; the armor protection on the conning tower sides was also increased on Hagen and Heimdall, to 160 mm (6.3 in).

=== Modifications ===
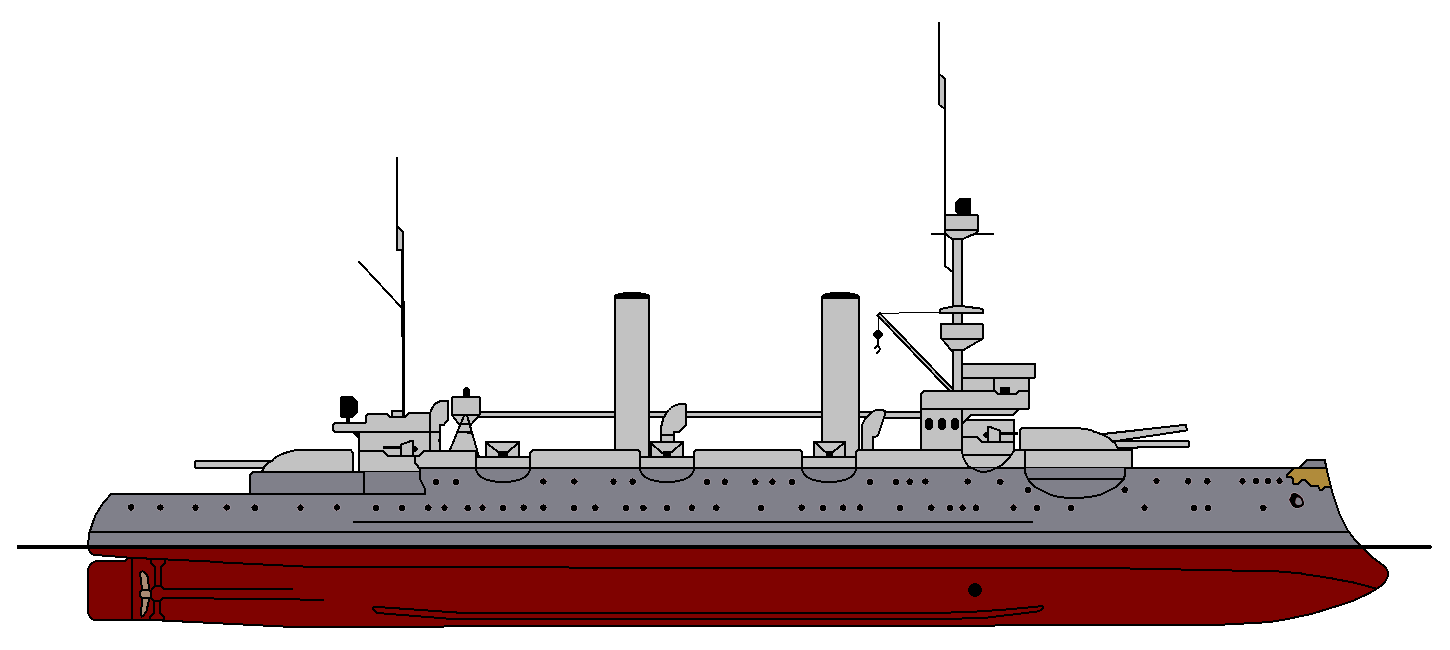
Illustration of Hagen in 1910 after her reconstruction

All six ships were heavily rebuilt, each undergoing refits at various times between 1898 and 1904. During the rebuilding, the ships were lengthened, to 84.80 m (278 ft 3 in) at the waterline and 86.13 m (282 ft 7 in) overall, which included the addition of another watertight compartment. The ships' beams remained the same, but their draft was slightly decreased, to 5.45 m (17 ft 11 in) forward and 5.47 m (17 ft 11 in) aft. After the reconstruction, the displacement was increased to between 4,000 to 4,436 t (3,937 to 4,366 long tons), depending on the ship. With the refit, fuel bunkerage was more than doubled, to 580 t (570 long tons; 640 short tons) of coal and 500 t (490 long tons; 550 short tons) of oil. This dramatically increased the sailing range, to 3,400 nmi (6,300 km; 3,900 mi) at 10 knots and 1,940 nmi (3,590 km; 2,230 mi) at 14 knots. Siegfried received completely oil-fired boilers during her refit in 1895, but these boilers proved to be very inefficient and she later received the mixed-firing boilers installed on the other vessels. Each vessel received a second funnel to improve ventilation from the boilers.

The refit also revised the ships' armament slightly, including increasing the number of 8.8 cm guns to ten, including Siegfried. The munition storage for these weapons correspondingly increased to 2,500 rounds. The stern and lateral torpedo tubes were replaced with 45 cm (18 in) weapons, but the lateral torpedo tubes were submerged. They had 8 torpedoes between them. The bow tube was retained, but also moved below the waterline; it had three torpedoes. The refit increased crew requirements, to an additional 31 sailors normally, and the extra flagship crew increased to 9 officers and 34 men.

== Ships in class ==
Hagen during her reconstruction in 1899

Ship name	Builder	Contract name	Laid down	Launched	Commissioned	Decommissioned	Fate
Siegfried	Germaniawerft, Kiel	O	1888	10 August 1889	29 April 1890	14 January 1916	Sold for scrap, 1920
Beowulf	AG Weser, Bremen	P	January 1890	8 November 1890	1 April 1892	30 November 1918	Sold for scrap, 1921
Frithjof	AG Weser, Bremen	Q	February 1890	21 July 1891	23 February 1893	16 January 1916	Sold for scrap, 1930
Heimdall	Kaiserliche Werft, Wilhelmshaven	U	2 November 1891	27 July 1892	7 April 1894	2 March 1916	Sold for scrap, 1921
Hildebrand	Kaiserliche Werft, Kiel	R	9 December 1890	6 August 1892	28 October 1893	16 January 1916	Sunk while en route to scrapping, 1919; raised and scrapped, 1933
Hagen	Kaiserliche Werft, Kiel	S	September 1891	21 October 1893	2 October 1894	1 September 1915	Sold for scrap, 1919

== Service history ==
The ships of the Siegfried class saw only limited service in their intended roles. The revolutions in capital ship building in the first decade of the 20th century rapidly made these ships obsolete. The Second Naval Law, passed on 27 March 1908, reduced the service life of all capital ships from 25 years to 20 years. This meant that the Siegfried-class ships, along with a number of other vessels, were to be replaced as soon as possible. Siegfried, Beowulf, and Frithjof were replaced by the Helgoland-class battleships Helgoland, Thüringen, and Oldenburg. Heimdall, Hildebrand, and Hagen were replaced by the Kaiser-class battleships Kaiser, Friedrich der Grosse, and Kaiserin, respectively.

An unidentified member of the Siegfried or Odin class on patrol during World War I, c. 1915

As the new battleships were intended for offensive operations, the Siegfried class was still retained for coast defense duties. The ships served in this capacity through the start of World War I, until they were withdrawn from active service in 1915. Afterward, all six ships served in a variety of secondary roles, primarily as barracks ships. All six ships were struck from the naval register on 17 June 1919, shortly before the Treaty of Versailles, which ended the First World War, was signed. Siegfried was a barracks ship in Wilhelmshaven from 1916. She was intended to be rebuilt as a salvage ship, but this plan was abandoned and the vessel was sold to H. Peters, Wewelsfleth, in 1919 for 425,000 marks. She was broken up in 1920 in Kiel. Beowulf served as a target ship for U-boats from 1916 to 1918, when she transitioned to ice-breaking duty in the Baltic Sea. Frithjof was a barracks ship in Danzig after 1916. Following her removal from navy service, she was sold to A Bernstein in Hamburg. She was rebuilt as a freighter by Deutsche Werke, and served in this capacity until she was broken up in 1930. She was the longest serving Siegfried-class ship.

Heimdall was a barracks ship for the crews of U-boats and the Ems coast defense flotilla based in Emden. Like Siegfried, Heimdall was intended to be reconstructed as a salvage ship, and this was likewise abandoned. She was broken up for scrap metal in 1921. Hildebrand was a barracks ship in Windau after she was removed from active duty. She was sold to a Dutch ship-breaking firm in 1919, but while en route to the scrapyard, she became grounded on the Dutch coast. The wreck was blown up in 1933, and eventually scrapped in situ. Hagen was a barracks ship in Libau, Danzig, and Warnemünde during the remainder of World War I. She was sold for scrapping to Norddeutsche Tiefbaugesellschaft after the end of the war.
