= 24 cm Theodor Bruno Kanone (E) =

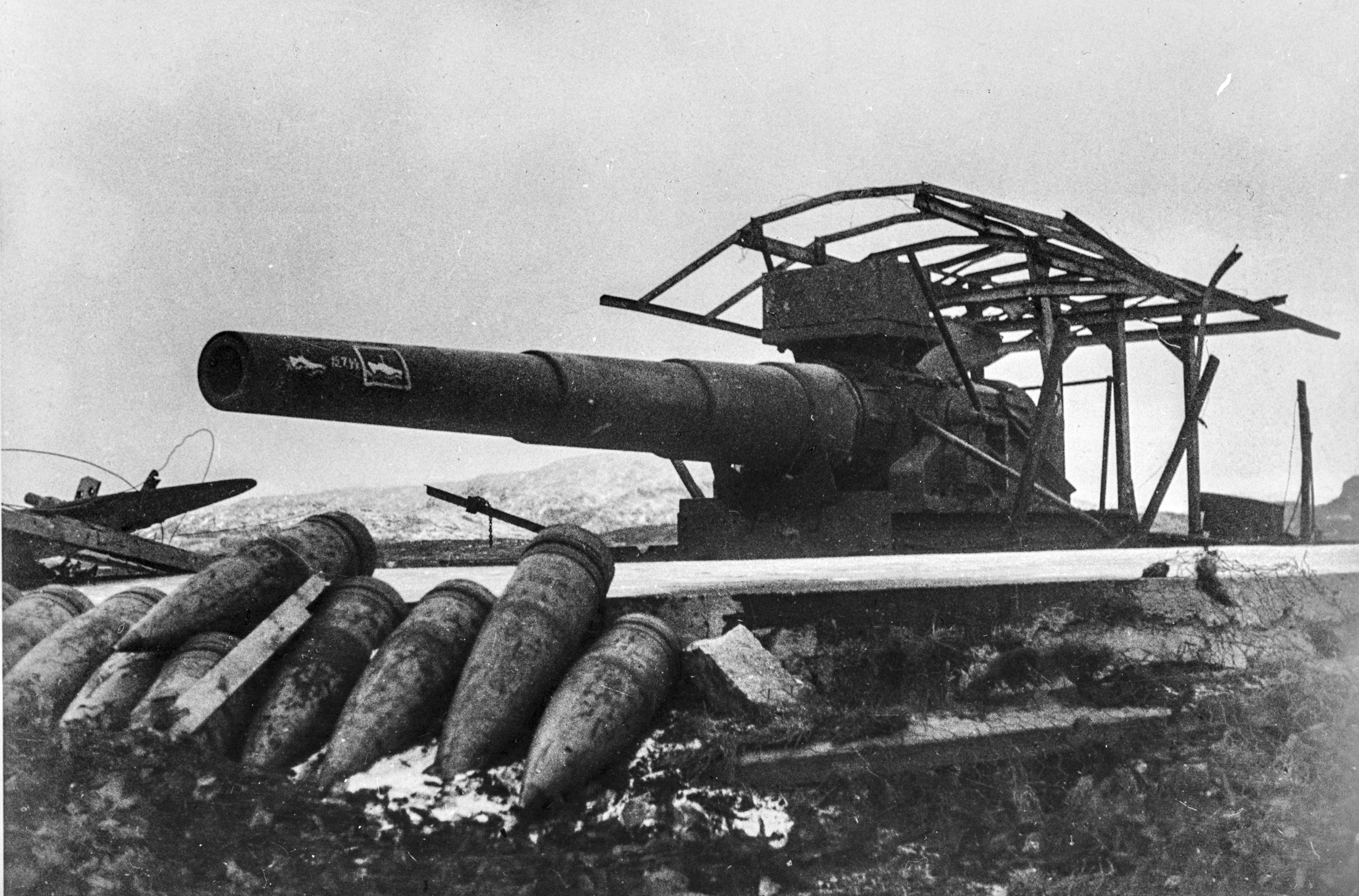
- A 24 cm cannon captured by the Russians during the Petsamo–Kirkenes Offensive.
- Type: Railway Gun
- Place of origin: Germany

Service history
- In service: 1938–45
- Used by: Nazi Germany
- Wars: World War II

Production history
- Designer: Krupp
- Manufacturer: Krupp
- Produced: 1937–39
- No. built: 6

Specifications
- Mass: 95 tonnes (93 long tons; 105 short tons)
- Length: 20.7 metres (67 ft 11 in)
- Barrel length: 7.8 metres (25 ft 7 in) L/35
- Shell: separate-loading, cased charge
- Caliber: 238 millimetres (9.4 in)
- Breech: horizontal sliding-block
- Recoil: hydro-pneumatic
- Carriage: 2 x 4-axle bogies
- Elevation: +10° to +45° (firing)
- Traverse: 18' on mounting 360° on Vögele turntable
- Rate of fire: 1 round per 3 minutes
- Muzzle velocity: 670 m/s (2,200 ft/s)
- Maximum firing range: 20,200 metres (22,100 yd)

The 24 cm Theodor Bruno Kanone (E - Eisenbahnlafette (railroad mounting)) was a German railroad gun used during World War II in the Battle of France and on coast-defense duties in Occupied France for the rest of the war. Six were built during the 1930s using fifty-year-old ex-naval guns.

== Design ==
As part of the re-armament program initiated by the Nazis after taking power in 1933 the Army High Command (Oberkommando des Heeres - OKH) ordered Krupp to begin work on new railroad artillery designs, but they would take a long time to develop. Krupp pointed out that it could deliver a number of railroad guns much more quickly using obsolete guns already on hand and modernizing their original World War I mountings for which it still had drawings available. OKH agreed and authorized Krupp in 1936 to begin design of a series of guns between 15 and 28 cm (5.9 and 11.0 in) for delivery by 1939 as the Emergency Program (Sofort-Programm).

Six ancient 24 cm K L/35 C/88 guns originally used by the Odin-class coastal defense ships (Küstenpanzerschiff) that had equipped Batteries S1 at Sylt and Bremen at Norderney after those ships were disarmed in 1916 were placed on new mounts beginning in 1937. The gun could traverse only enough on the mount itself for fine corrections (the exact amount is disputed among the sources), coarser adjustments had to be made by turning the entire mount on the Vögele turntable. The turntable (Drehscheibe) consisted of a circular track with a pivot mount in the center for a platform on which the railroad gun itself was secured. A ramp was used to raise the railway gun to the level of the platform. The platform had rollers at each end which rested on the circular rail for 360° traverse. It had a capacity of 300 tonnes (300 long tons; 330 short tons), enough for most of the railroad guns in the German inventory. The gun could only be loaded at 0° elevation and so had to be re-aimed for each shot. All six guns were delivered by 1939.

=== Ammunition ===
The shells for this gun were loaded using a four-wheeled ammunition cart to move the shells and powder from the rear of the mount where it was hoisted from the ground or an ammunition car by the on-mount crane. It used the German naval system of ammunition where the base charge was held in a metallic cartridge case and supplemented by another charge in a silk bag which was rammed first.

Shell name	Weight	Filling Weight	Muzzle velocity	Range
Nose- and base-fused HE shell with ballistic cap (Sprenggranate L/4.2 m Bdz u. Kz. m. Hb)	148.5 kg (327 lb)	16.4 kg (36 lb) (TNT)	675 m/s (2,210 ft/s)	20,200 m (22,100 yd)
Base-fused armor-piercing shell with ballistic cap (Panzer-Sprenggranate) L/4.5 m Bdz. m Hb)	150.5 kg (332 lb)	8.18 kg (18.0 lb) (TNT)	Unknown	Unknown

== Combat history ==
During the Battle of France Theodor Brunos equipped Batteries 664 (2 guns), 721 (1 gun), and 722 (2 guns). Their only known activity was when Battery 721 bombarded French casemates in the Vosges during June in support of the Seventh Army. From July 1941 two guns spent the rest of the war on coast defense duties assigned to Battery 664 in the vicinity of Hendaye and Saint-Jean-de-Luz near the Spanish border with France although sources differ on their arrival date. Battery 664 was able to retreat to Germany by 1 September 1944 after the invasion of Normandy began in June 1944, but nothing is known of its activities afterwards. Battery 721 transferred its one gun to Battery 722 sometime prior to June 1941 when the latter mustered four Theodor Brunos. Battery 722 defended Cherbourg Naval Base from 1941 to 1944 until being destroyed when the Americans captured the port on 30 June 1944.
