= 24 cm K L/35 =

German naval gun

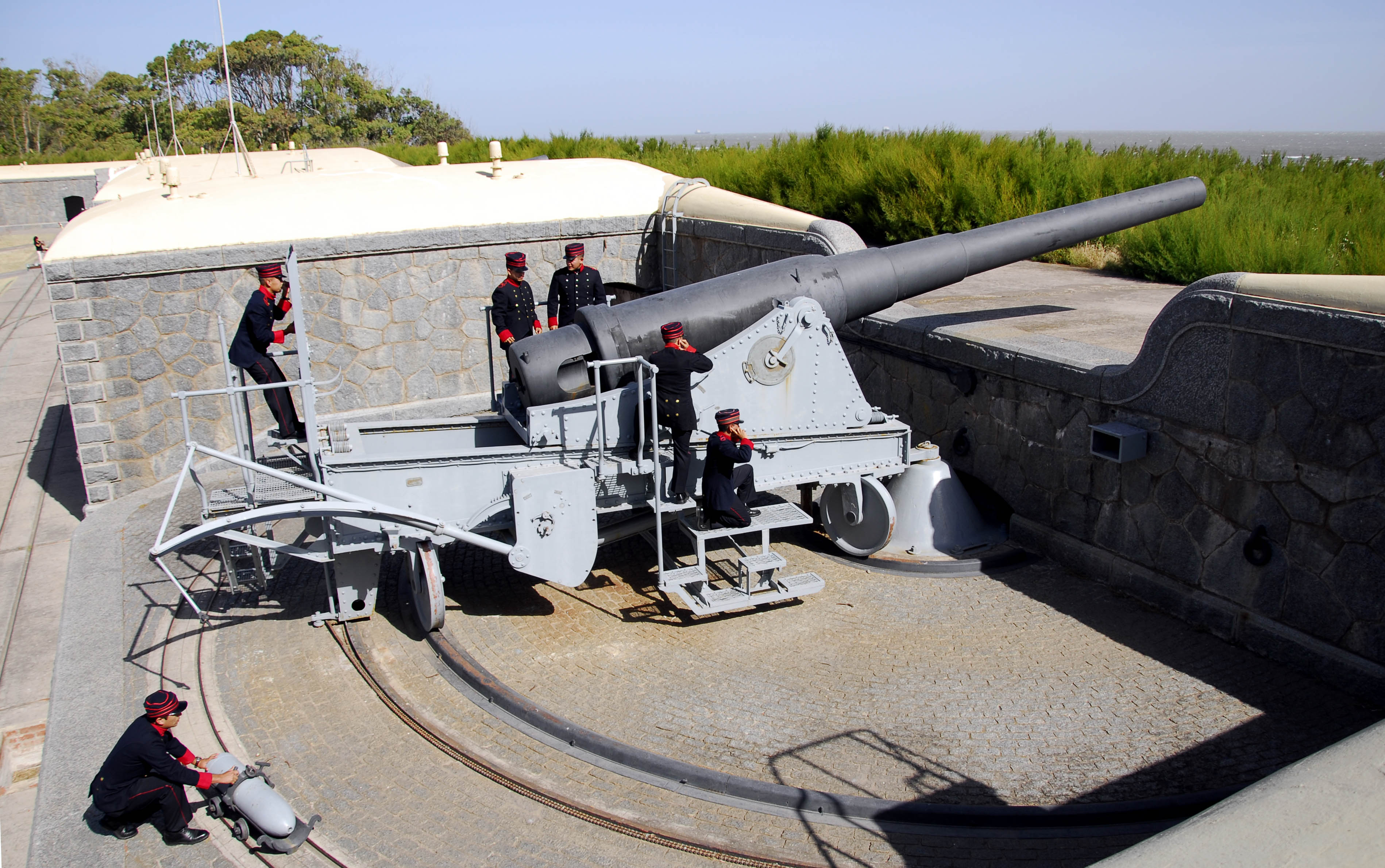
- One of the four 24 cm L/35 guns of battery No4 at Puerto Belgrano.
- Type: Naval gun Coastal artillery Railway gun
- Place of origin: German Empire

Service history
- In service: 1890–1945
- Used by: German Empire; Argentina; Austria-Hungary; Ottoman Empire
- Wars: Boxer Rebellion; World War I World War II

Production history
- Designer: Krupp
- Designed: 1888
- Manufacturer: Krupp
- Produced: 1888

Specifications
- Mass: 21.5 t (23.7 short tons)
- Length: 8.4 m (27 ft 7 in)
- Barrel length: 7.8 m (25 ft 7 in)
- Shell: Separate loading bagged charges and projectiles
- Shell weight: 140–215 kg (309–474 lb)
- Caliber: 24 cm (9.4 in) 35 caliber
- Breech: Cylindro-prismatic breech block
- Elevation: -4° to +25°
- Traverse: -150° to +150°
- Rate of fire: 2 rpm
- Muzzle velocity: 580–650 m/s (1,900–2,100 ft/s)
- Maximum firing range: 13 km (8.1 mi) at +25°

The 24 cm K L/35 was a German naval gun developed in the years before World War I that armed ships of the Imperial German Navy, Argentine Navy and the Austro-Hungarian Navy. Guns removed from ships of the Imperial German Navy were modified to perform Coastal Artillery and Railway Artillery roles and saw service in both world wars.

== Context ==
=== The 24 cm MRK L/25 ===
In the early 1870s there were two Krupp 24 cm naval guns: the 24 cm RK L/20 and the 24 cm RK L/22. The first major changes to their design came with the 24 cm MRK L/25. This gun was first tested in December 1875 as a L/22 gun with a caliber of 240 mm instead of 235.4 mm. It also used a charge that was about 60% higher, made possible by a slower burning type of gunpowder.

Other innovations that the L/25 brought were heavier projectiles and projectiles that used copper driving bands. In all probability, this gun was already a Mantel Ring Kanone, i.e. hooped and jacketed instead of only hooped like a Ring Kanone (RK). Even the prototype of this gun was thought to be 40% more powerful than the original 24 cm RK L/22.

=== The 24 cm MRK L/25.5 ===
The 24 cm MRK L/25.5 was based on the latest insights in gunpowder technology, especially the insight that the charge of a gun could be increased without raising peak pressures as long as enough air-space was also added and the charge was properly packed. However, this did require longer guns to consume the increased charge.

In August 1879, the 24 cm MRK L/25.5 was tested in Meppen. It then fired with a charge of 75 kg, almost double the 39 kg of the L/25. The result was a spectacular improvement, as a 160.5 kg grenade was propelled to a velocity of 573 m/s instead of only 473 m/s for the L/25. The next day, the gun created a sensation by smashing through two plates of armor that were 51 cm thick in total.

=== The 24 cm MRK L/30 ===
In the early 1880s, the Netherlands had the 24 cm MRK L/25 as its heaviest coastal gun. In 1882, the Dutch Minister of War then asked for money to buy four 24 cm MRK L/30. It's not clear whether the production of this gun influenced the 24 cm K L/35. What is known is that it was tested in December 1874. This seems to have been before known tests with the L/35.

== Development ==
=== C/80 ===
The development of the 24 cm MRK L/25.5 and other guns led Krupp to design a whole series of longer L/30 and L/35 guns. This was known as the Construction 1880 or C/80.

In June, July and October 1885, a 24 cm K L/35 C/80 was tested in Meppen. At 22,240 kg it was said to be heavier and was also said to also have a larger chamber. The projectiles that it fired were L/3.5 215 kg cast iron replacement for the steel armor piercing grenade. These were the same as those that the L/30 had used in December 1884.

The reference to the gun being heavier than the normal gun is interesting, because it is not clear what was meant. In the report it was stated that at 22,240 kg, the gun was 1,390 kg heavier than the normal 24 cm L/35. From earlier statements, we have a designed weight of 21,500 kg for a 24 cm K L/35. There are however also references to the C/80 system that have a 'normal' weight of 20,850 kg.

=== C/86 ===
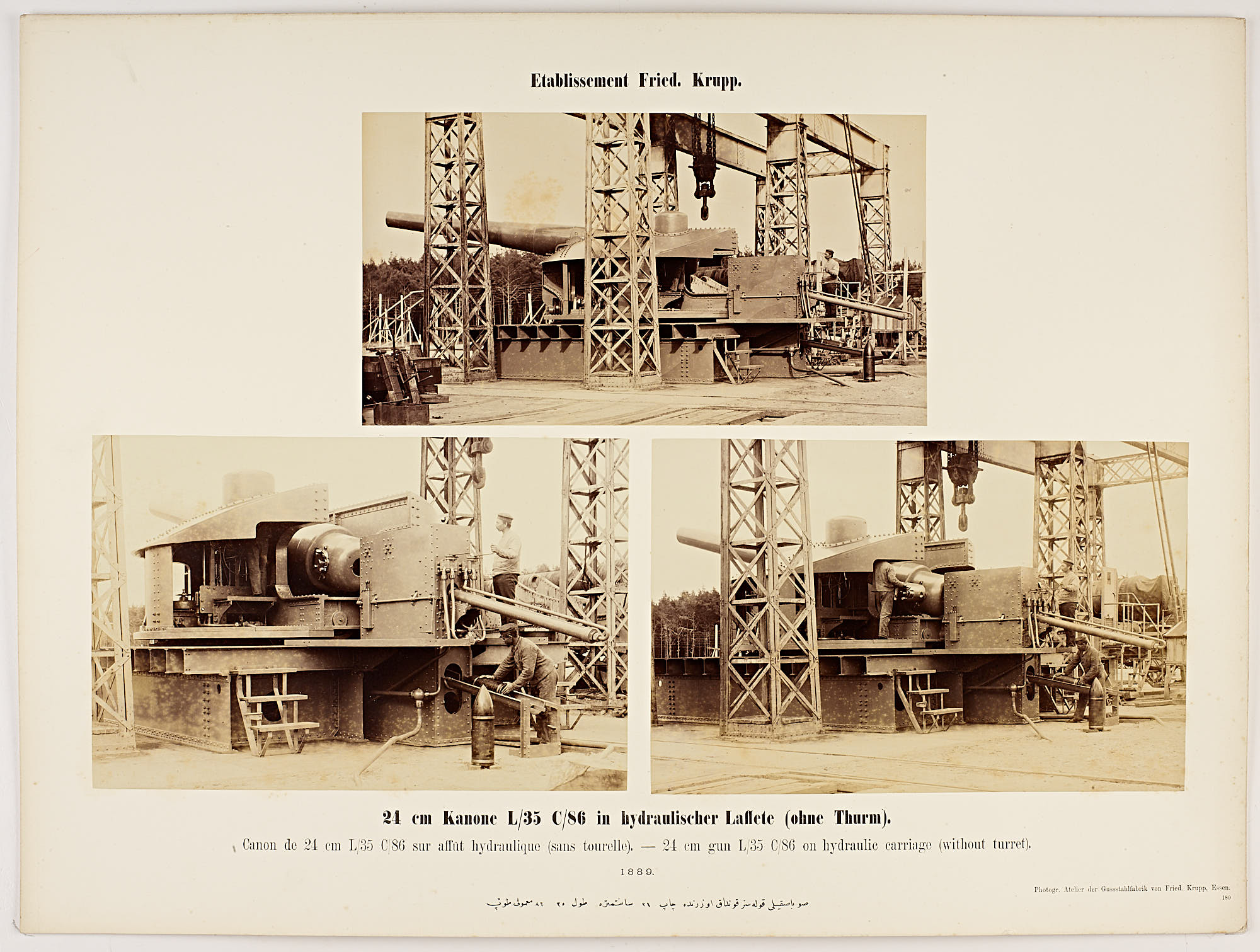
24 cm MRK L/35 C/86, 1889

The Austro-Hungarian navy had a 24 cm L/35 C/86. From 1890 to 1893, the Austro-Hungarian navy held three trials for determining the best new type of armor for its new ships. For the 1891 trials, the C/86 was charged with 45 kg of prismatic gunpowder C/86. This gave a low velocity of 432 m/s, theoretically good enough for the 215 kg steel grenade to still penetrate 393 mm of wrought iron, which was thought to be equivalent to the new 270 mm steel armor plates under test.

The primary actor in all these tests was the Austrian 15 cm MRK L/35 C/86. This lighter gun was fired with its full charge, and was probably thought to be a good measure for testing the 270 mm armor types. This proved correct, but in the end the 24 cm C/86 proved a worthwhile addition to the tests.

=== C/87 ===
The C/87 models differed from the C/86 models by being lighter, using a lower charge, and attaining a lower velocity, but nevertheless having more impact per kg of barrel weight. The C/87 system introduced longer guns of 40 caliber (L/40) length.

In 1888 Krupp designed the 24 cm K L/35 and started production to arm two classes of the Imperial German Navy's coastal defense ships. Krupp also produced guns for export that armed one class of coastal defense ships for Argentina and one class of protected cruisers and one unique armored cruiser for Austria-Hungary. The Ottoman Osmaniye-class ironclads were rearmed with these guns in the early 1890s.

== Characteristics ==
=== C/80 ===
The 24 cm L/35 C/80 that was tested in 1885 was 8,400 mm (L/35) long with a length of bore of 7,687 mm (L/32). The barrel weighed 22,240 kg.

The coastal carriage weighed 14,430 kg. It could elevate the gun to 19.5 degrees and decline it to 4 degrees.

The weight of the armort piercing steel grenade was 215 kg.

With a charge of 98 kg, the 215 kg projectile attained a velocity of 600 m/s. The gas pressure with this kind of charge and projectile was 2,400-2,600 atm. Calculations showed that the total energy was enough to pierce 63 cm of wrought iron armor at the muzzle, and 49 cm at 2,000 m.

=== C/86 ===
The 24 cm L/35 C/86 of the Austro-Hungarian navy was also 8,400 mm long. It had 56 parallel grooves with a progressive twist rate that reached L/25, meaning that at the muzzle, the projectile rotated quickly. The barrel weighed 26,900 kg.

The Austrian upper carriage weighed 2,400 kg and the slide 4,500 kg.

The projectiles fired by the C/86 were steel and percussion grenades of 215 kg. The steel grenade contained an explosive charge of 2.6 kg, the percussion grenade 8.1 kg.

When the C/86 was designed, the introduction of smokeless powder was still a few years in the future. Therefore, in 1890, the charge was 100 kg of brown prismatic powder. This gave the 215 kg steel grenade an initial velocity of 610 m/s. By the mid 1890s, the charge of the C/86 was only 48 kg of 'Ammon Kuchen Pulver'. This was obviously an advanced kind of gunpowder, because it propelled the projectile to 640 m/s, leading to a penetration power of 70 cm of wrought iron.

== Naval Artillery ==
The 24 cm K L/35 was the primary armament of the Siegfried class and Odin class coastal defense ships of the Imperial German Navy.

German ship details:
- Siegfried-class - The six ships of this class had a primary armament of three guns in an unusual arrangement. Two MPL C/88 single gun turrets were mounted side-by-side forward, while a third was mounted aft of the central superstructure in a single gun turret.
- Odin-class - The two ships of this class had a primary armament of three guns in an unusual arrangement. Two MPL C/93 single gun turrets were mounted side-by-side forward, while a third was mounted aft of the central superstructure in a single gun turret.

The 24 cm K L/35 was also the primary armament of the Argentine Navy's Independencia-class coastal defense ships.

Argentine ship details:
- Independencia-class – The two ships of this class had a primary armament of two guns, which were mounted in two single gun turrets, one fore and one aft of the central superstructure.

The 24 cm MRK L/35 C/86 was the primary armament of the Kaiser Franz Joseph I class of protected cruisers and the unique armored cruiser SMS Kaiserin und Königin Maria Theresia.

Austro-Hungarian ship details:
- Kaiser Franz Joseph I-class - The two ships of this class had a primary armament of two guns, which were mounted in two single gun turrets, one fore and one aft of the central superstructure.
- SMS Kaiserin und Königin Maria Theresia - This ship had a primary armament of two guns, which were mounted in two single gun turrets, one fore and one aft of the central superstructure.
- SMS Tegetthoff In the 1890s, Tegetthoff was rearmed with six 24 cm MRK L/35 C/86.

The Japanese cruiser Unebi was armed with four 24 cm MRK L/35 and six 15 cm MRK L/35.

== Coastal Artillery ==
=== Germany ===
During 1916 the Odin-class ships were decommissioned and disarmed. The 24 cm K L/35 guns salvaged from these ships were converted to coastal artillery. Three guns were emplaced at Battery Bremen on Norderney and three guns were emplaced at Battery S1 on Sylt. They remained there until the late 1930s.

=== Argentina ===
There are currently four guns belonging to battery No4 at Puerto Belgrano, Argentina.

=== Türkiye ===
Ottoman Empire purchased thirty 24 cm K L/35 guns during the 1880s. In February 1889, ten 24 cm L/35 and two 35.5 cm 80 tons guns arrived in Istanbul via Antwerp. A number of L/35s engaged the allied naval forces during the Gallipoli campaign.

=== Netherlands ===
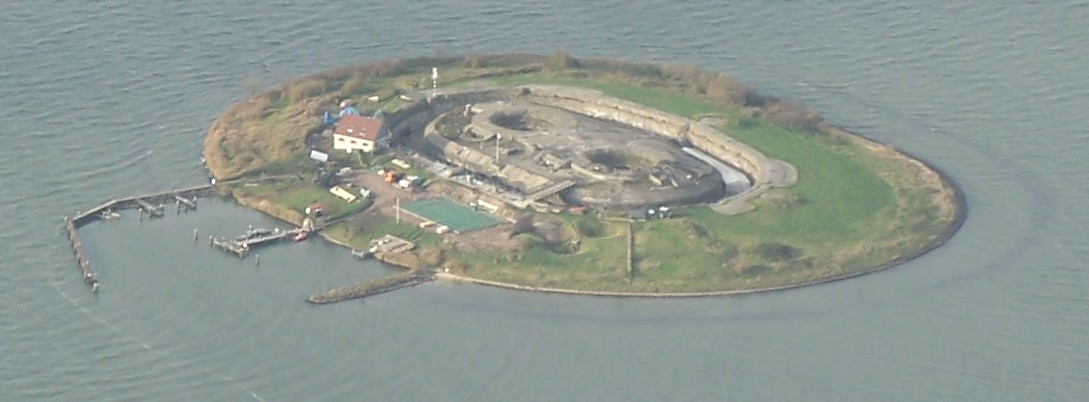
Pampus, Netherlands

In the Netherlands, the artificial island fortress Pampus was built to block the approach to Amsterdam from the Zuiderzee It was armed with four 24 cm K L/35. This was a very powerful fortress, because the guns were protected by armored cupolas. The four guns cost 225,000 guilders. The two armored cupolas were ordered at Gruson for 953,000 guilders. The four carriages were also ordered at Gruson and cost 147,000 guilders. These carriages were minimal port carriages, which allowed a minimal embrasure.

Pampus was supported by two batteries which were only covered by earthworks. North of Pampus, at Durgerdam there was a battery of three 24 cm K L/35. South of it was Fort Diemerdam with three 24 cm K L/35. In 1895 three emplacements for 24 cm K L/35 were made near Den Helder. There was speculation that the three guns from Diemerdam would be moved there. In 1904 three emplacements for 24 cm K L/35 were made on the western side of Oostbatterij at Den Helder. The three 24 cm K L/35 from Durgerdam were to be moved to this position.

== Railway Artillery ==
Beginning in 1937 the six guns at Norderny and Sylt were converted to railway artillery and were collectively known as 24 cm Theodor Bruno Kanone (E). During the Battle of France Theodor Brunos equipped three batteries of two guns each. Later one battery of four guns defended Cherbourg Naval Base from 1941 until June 1944 when they were destroyed during the Battle of Cherbourg.

== Photo Gallery ==
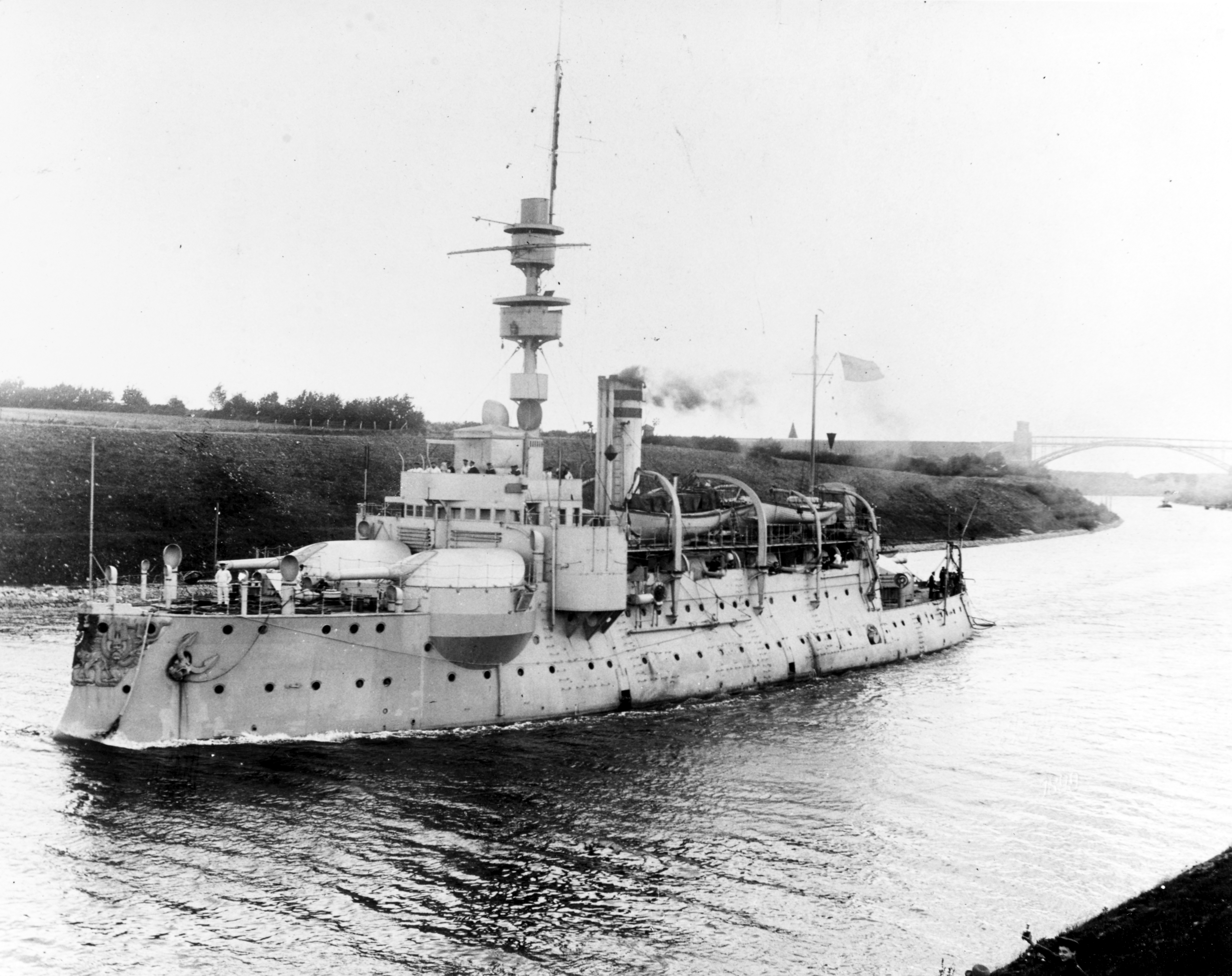
The forward 24 cm K L/35 gun turrets aboard SMS Odin

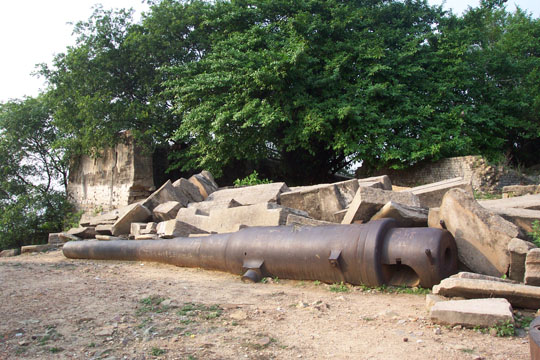
A 24 cm L/35 fortress gun in Dongguan China.

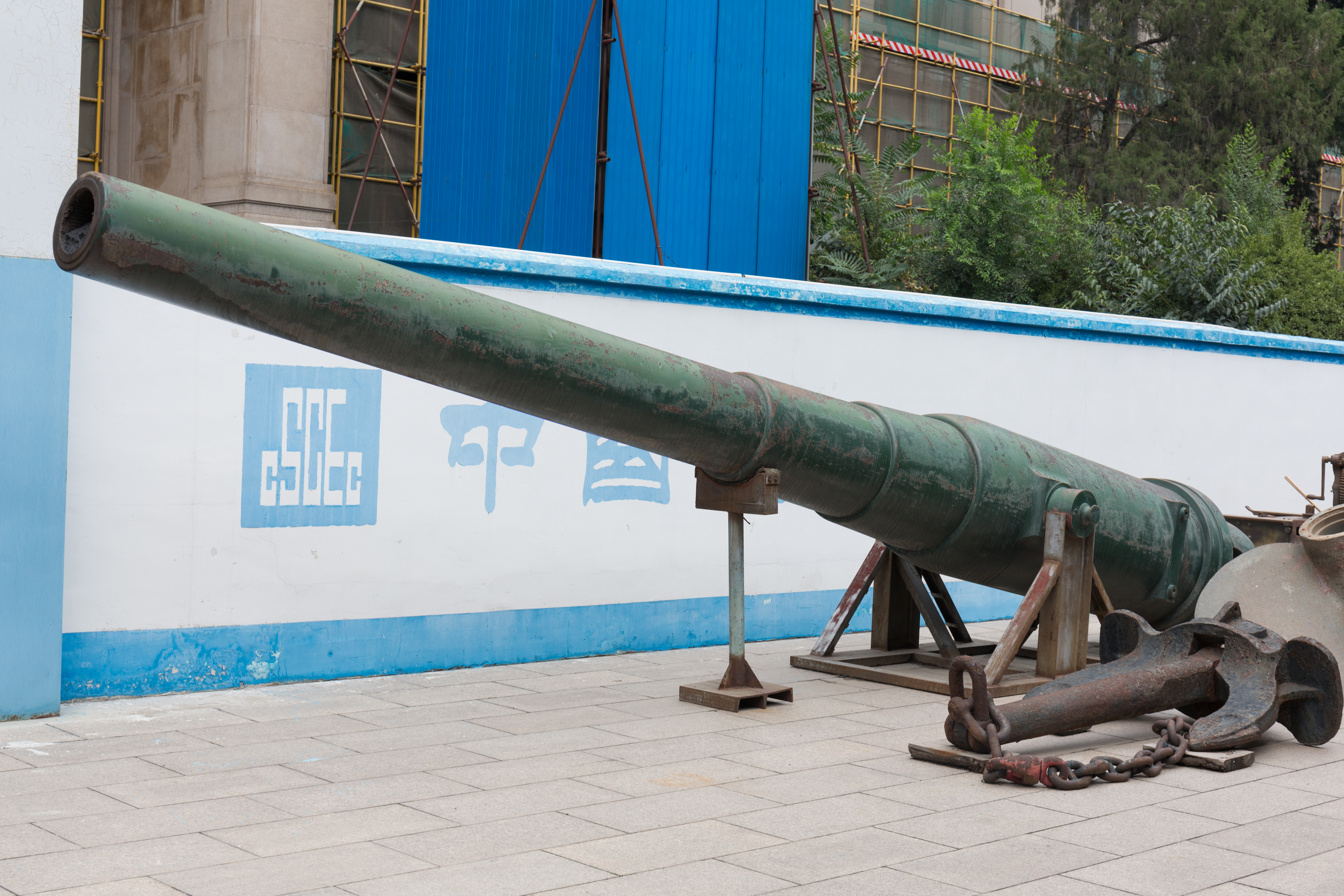
A 24 cm L/35 fortress gun in the Military Museum in Beijing China.

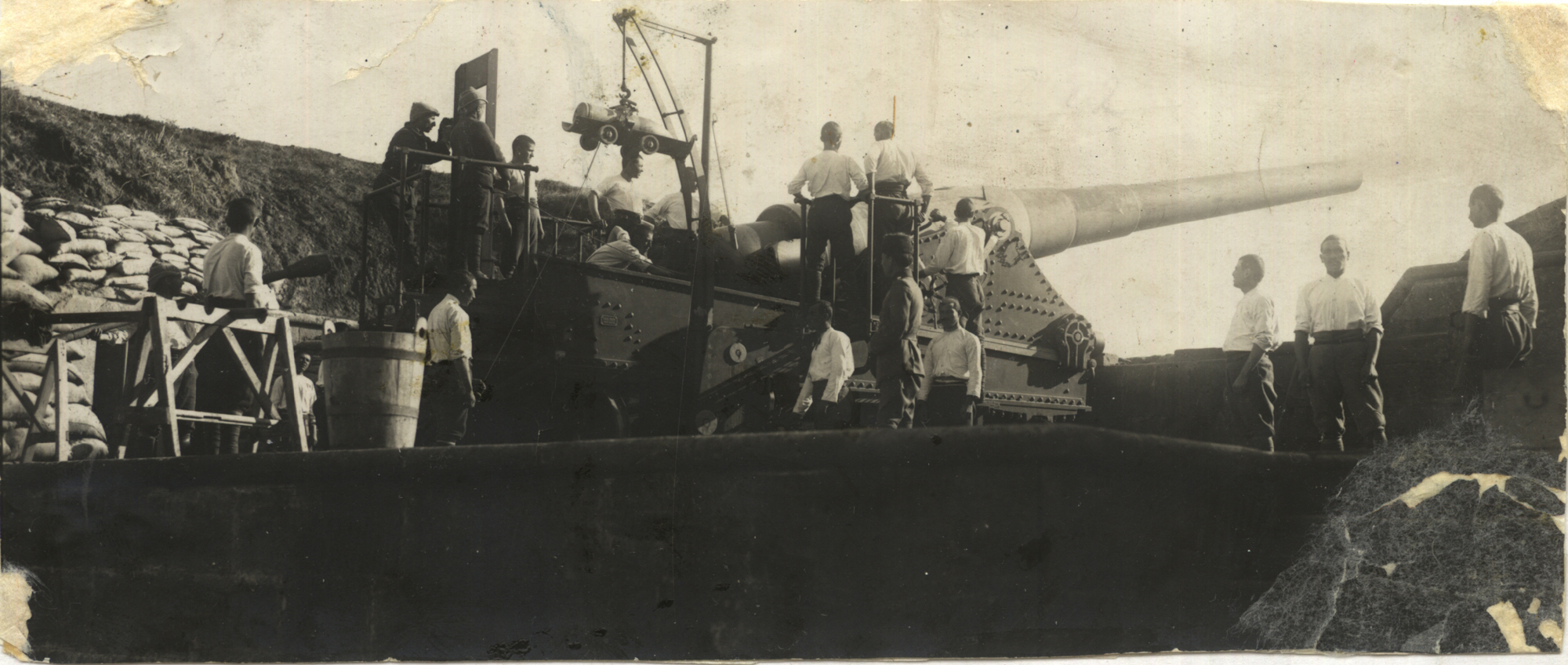
One of the Ottoman guns which helped sink the French battleship Bouvet.

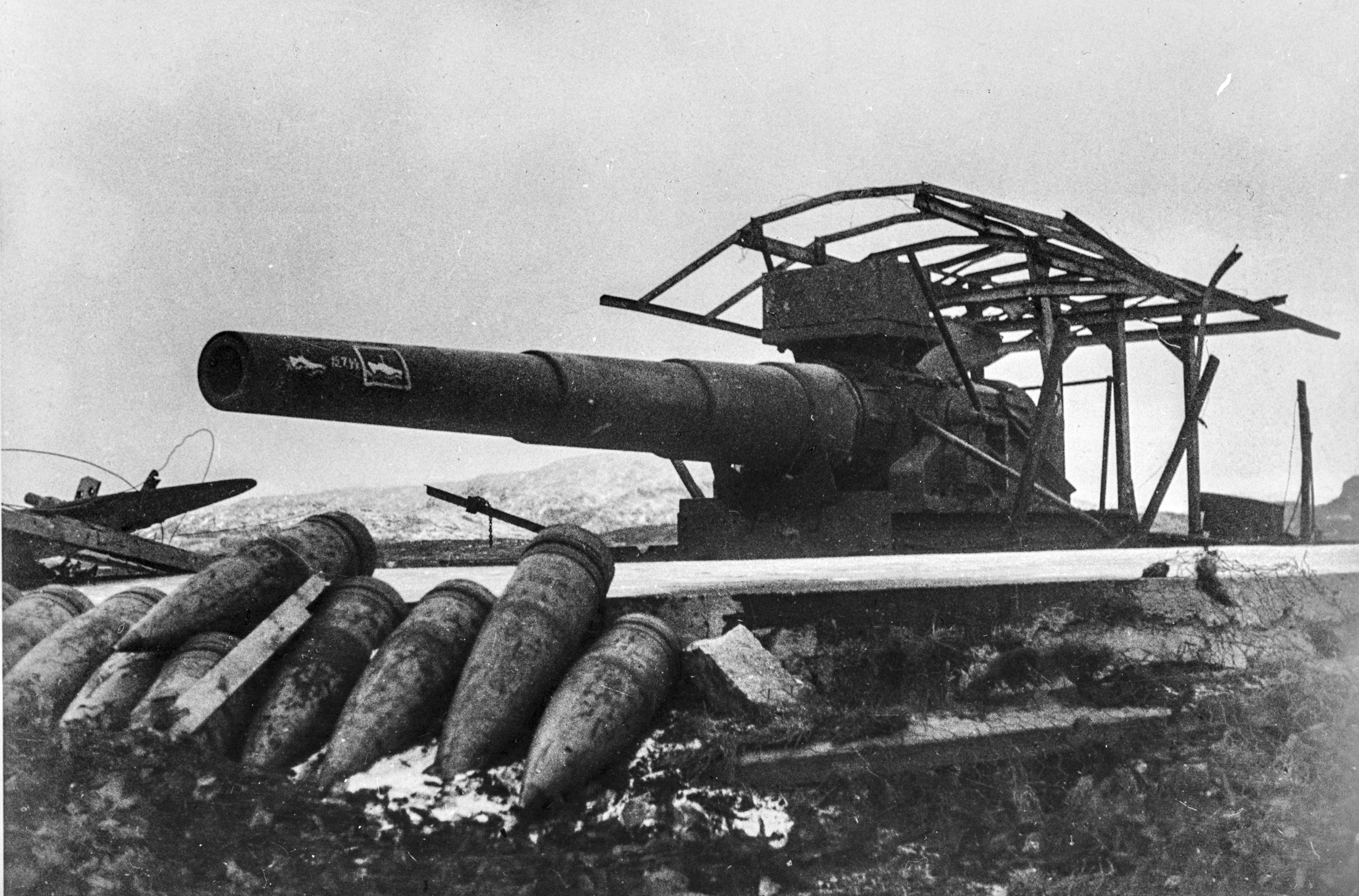
A 24 cm railroad gun captured by the Russians during the Petsamo–Kirkenes Offensive.

== Bibliography ==
- Almanach für die K. und K. Kriegsmarine, Mittheilungen aus dem Gebiete des Seewesens, Pola, 1896
- "Türkei". Armee-Blatt. 19 March 1889.
- "Niederländisches festungsystem" [Dutch fortress system]. Brockhaus' Konversations-Lexikon (in German). Vol. XII (14th ed.). Leipzig: F. A. Brockhaus. 1894. OCLC 26735035.
- "Onze buren in Oost-Azië". Marineblad. C. de Boer, Den Helder. 1887. p. 157-165.
- Chamberlain, Peter (1979). Weapons of the Third Reich: An Encyclopedic Survey of All Small Arms, Artillery and Special Weapons of the German Land Forces 1939-1945. New York: Doubleday. ISBN 0-385-15090-3.
- Fischer, Eduard (1876). "Die Ausstellung F. Krupp's zu Philadelphia in artilleristischer Beziehung". Mitteilungen über Gegenstände des Artillerie- und Geniewesens. K.K. Technischen & Administrativen Militär-Comité. p. 405.
- "Die k. und k. Flotte". Österreichisch-ungarische Revue. A. Mayer-Wyde, Verlag der Österreichisch-ungarischen Revue. 1894. p. 1-18.
- François, Guy (2006-01-01). Eisenbahnartillerie: Histoire de l'artillerie lourd sur voie ferrée allemande des origines à 1945. Paris: Editions Histoire et Fortifications. ISBN 2915767084.
- Herman, Anton (1894). "Comparative Beschießung von 270 mm Panzerplatten versciedener Provenienzen am Schießplatze Monte Cane zu Pola". Mittheilungen aus dem Gebiete des Seewesens. K.K. Hydrographischen Amte, Marine-Bibliothek, Pola: 1-15.
- "De Proeven te Meppen in Augustus 1879". De Militaire Spectator. Broese & Comp. Breda: 637–649. 1879.
- Friedman, Norman (2011). Naval Weapons of World War One. Barnsley, South Yorkshire, UK: Seaforth. ISBN 978-1-84832-100-7.
- "Stapellauf des österreichisch-ungarischen Torpedorammschiffes Kaiserin Elisabeth". Mitteilungen über Gegenstände des Artillerie- und Geniewesens. Vol. XVIII, no. X. K.K. Technischen & Administrativen Militär-Comité. 1890. p. 609-610.
- Von Löbell (1889). "Material der Artillerie 188/89". Jahresberichte über die Veränderungen und Fortschritte im Militärwesen. Von Löbell, Berlin. p. 815-845.
- Von Müller, Hermann (1879), Die Entwickelung der preußischen Küsten- und Schiffs-Artillerie von 1860-1878, Robert Oppenheim, Berlin
- Reuther (1882). "Staatsbegrooting voor het dienstjaar 1883". Bijlagen van het verslag der handelingen 1882-1883. Tweede Kamer der Staten Generaal, Den Haag. p. Bijlagen A VIII MvT.
- Sc (1880). "Die Neuere Schiffs- und Küstengeschütze der Krupp'schen Gussstahlfabrik". Mittheilungen aus dem Gebiete des Seewesens. K.K. Hydrographischen Amte, Marine-Bibliothek, Pola: 693–706.
- "Schießversuche (1883-1885) der Gusstahlfabrik Friedrich Krupp auf ihrem Schießplatz bei Meppen". Mitteilungen über Gegenstände des Artillerie- und Geniewesens. K.K. Technischen & Administrativen Militär-Comité. 1886. p. Notizen 37-50.
- Smith, Charles S.; Crispin, S. (1880). "A set of tables showing ... the most powerful rifled guns ... 1880..." House Documents. Government Printing Office, Washington. p. 506-516.
- Stuten (1893). "Notulen der vergadering van den 13den september 1892". Tijdschrift van het Koninklijk Instituut van Ingenieurs. KNVI.
- "Staatsbegrooting voor het Dienstjaar 1906". Militaire Spectator; Tijdschrift voor Het Nederlandsche Leger. Vincent Loosjes, Haarlem. 1906.
- "De Vestingbegroting voor 1895". Het nieuws van den dag : kleine courant. 11 October 1894.
