= List of coastal defense ships of Germany =

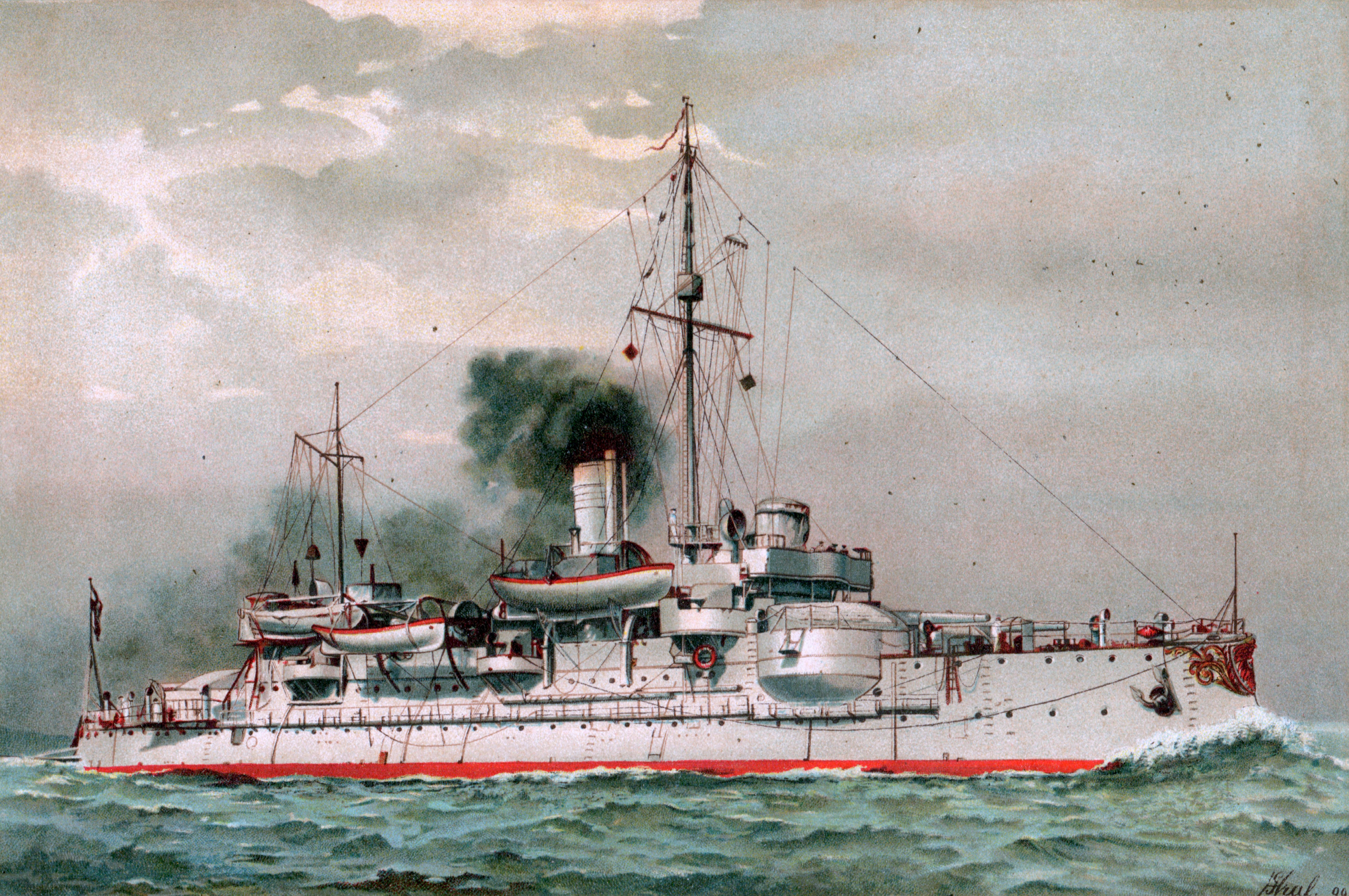
Lithograph of SMS Hagen in 1902

In the 1880s, Germany built a series of coastal defense ships to protect its coastline on the North and Baltic Seas. During the 1870s and early 1880s, the Imperial German Navy had built a number of ironclad warships of various designs. In the mid-1880s, however, dissatisfaction with the Sachsen-class ironclads and the rise of the Jeune École doctrine persuaded Leo von Caprivi, then the chief of the Imperial Navy to turn away from capital ship construction in favor of coastal defense ships and torpedo boats. As a result, the next class of large warships, the Siegfried class, was significantly smaller than the earlier ironclads, and armed with a main battery of only three large-caliber guns. These vessels were intended only for defense of German harbors. Six of them were built between 1888 and 1894. Another two ships of the Odin class were built to a modified design between 1892 and 1896.

All eight of the ships were heavily modernized between 1898 and 1904; the reconstruction included lengthening the ships and equipping them with new boilers. All eight ships were mobilized briefly at the start of World War I in August 1914 as the VI Battle Squadron, though by August 1915, they had all been withdrawn from service and employed in secondary roles. All were stricken from the naval register in 1919 after the end of the war and subsequently discarded; three of the ships, Frithjof, Odin, and Ägir were converted into merchant ships and served in this capacity throughout the 1920s. The rest were broken up for scrap by the early 1920s.

These coastal defense ships turned out to be a temporary diversion for the German fleet. In 1888, before any of the Siegfrieds or Odins had been laid down, Caprivi was selected to replace Chancellor Otto von Bismarck, who had been forced out of the position by the new Kaiser, Wilhelm II; Caprivi in turn was replaced by Vice Admiral Alexander von Monts. Monts, a veteran naval officer, opposed Caprivi's policy on coastal defense, and instead proposed building four new 10,000-metric-ton (9,800-long-ton; 11,000-short-ton) Brandenburg-class battleships. These ships replaced what would have been the last two of the coastal defenders for which Caprivi had called. This set Germany on the trend of building large, ocean-going battleships for the next two decades. Indeed, Grand Admiral Alfred von Tirpitz characterized the period the Siegfried and Odin classes were built, up to the passage of the First Naval Law in 1898, as the "wasted decade".

Key
| Armament | The number and type of the primary armament |
| Armor | The thickness of the belt armor |
| Displacement | Ship displacement at full combat load (Note: Historian Erich Gröner states that full load was defined as "[equal to] type displacement plus full load fuel oil, diesel oil, coal, reserve boiler feed water, aircraft fuel, and special equipment.") |
| Propulsion | Number of shafts, type of propulsion system, and top speed generated |
| Service | The dates work began and finished on the ship and its ultimate fate |
| Laid down | The date the keel began to be assembled |
| Commissioned | The date the ship was commissioned |

== Siegfried class ==
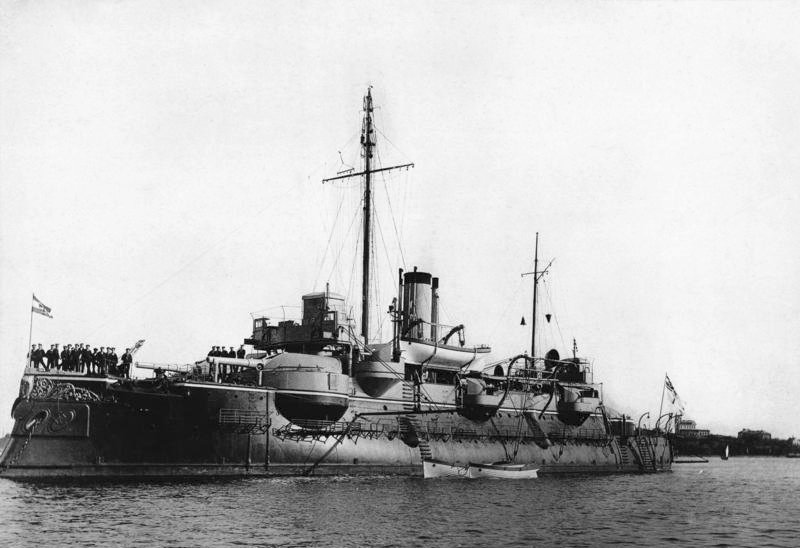
Beowulf at anchor

In 1883, when General Leo von Caprivi became the chief of the Imperial Navy, he discarded the fleet policy of his predecessor, Albrecht von Stosch, in favor of creating a fleet that could defend Germany's coast. (Note: Stosch had instead favored building an ocean-going fleet that could operate on the high seas; under his tenure, Germany had built the third-largest ironclad fleet in the world, behind only the British Royal Navy and the French Navy.) To that end, he called for the construction of new coastal defense ships that were larger than the unsuccessful Wespe-class gunboats but smaller than the Sachsen-class ironclads. They were to be sufficiently seaworthy to permit use in the North Sea, with armament and armor strong enough to allow them to engage larger, foreign battleships. Caprivi requested ten such vessels, though only eight would be built, the first six to the Siegfried design.

The six Siegfried class ships were used in fleet maneuvers throughout the 1890s, until they were reconstructed at the end of the decade. The modernization included re-boilering and lengthening, both of which improved the ships' speed. They were mobilized at the outbreak of World War I in August 1914, but remained on active service for only a year; in August 1915, they were withdrawn and used for secondary roles, primarily as barracks ships. All of the ships, save Frithjof, were scrapped after the end of the war. Frithjof was converted into a merchant ship instead, and operated until 1930, when she too was broken up for scrap.

Summary of the Siegfried class
| Ship | Armament | Armor | Displacement | Propulsion | Service | | |
| Ship | Armament | Armor | Displacement | Propulsion | Laid down | Commissioned | Fate |
|---|---|---|---|---|---|---|---|
| Siegfried | 3 × 24 cm (9.4 in) guns | 240 mm (9.4 in) | 3,741 t (3,682 long tons) | 2 shafts, 2 triple expansion engines, 15 kn (28 km/h; 17 mph) | 1888 | 29 April 1890 | Scrapped, 1920 |
| Beowulf | 3 × 24 cm (9.4 in) guns | 240 mm (9.4 in) | 3,741 t (3,682 long tons) | 2 shafts, 2 triple expansion engines, 15 kn (28 km/h; 17 mph) | 1890 | 1 April 1892 | Scrapped, 1921 |
| Frithjof | 3 × 24 cm (9.4 in) guns | 240 mm (9.4 in) | 3,741 t (3,682 long tons) | 2 shafts, 2 triple expansion engines, 15 kn (28 km/h; 17 mph) | 1890 | 23 February 1893 | Scuttled, 1930 |
| Heimdall | 3 × 24 cm (9.4 in) guns | 240 mm (9.4 in) | 3,741 t (3,682 long tons) | 2 shafts, 2 triple expansion engines, 15 kn (28 km/h; 17 mph) | 1891 | 7 April 1894 | Scrapped, 1921 |
| Hildebrand | 3 × 24 cm (9.4 in) guns | 240 mm (9.4 in) | 3,741 t (3,682 long tons) | 2 shafts, 2 triple expansion engines, 15 kn (28 km/h; 17 mph) | 1890 | 28 October 1893 | Ran aground and sunk, 1919 |
| Hagen | 3 × 24 cm (9.4 in) guns | 240 mm (9.4 in) | 3,741 t (3,682 long tons) | 2 shafts, 2 triple expansion engines, 15 kn (28 km/h; 17 mph) | 1891 | 2 October 1894 | Scrapped, 1919 |

== Odin class ==
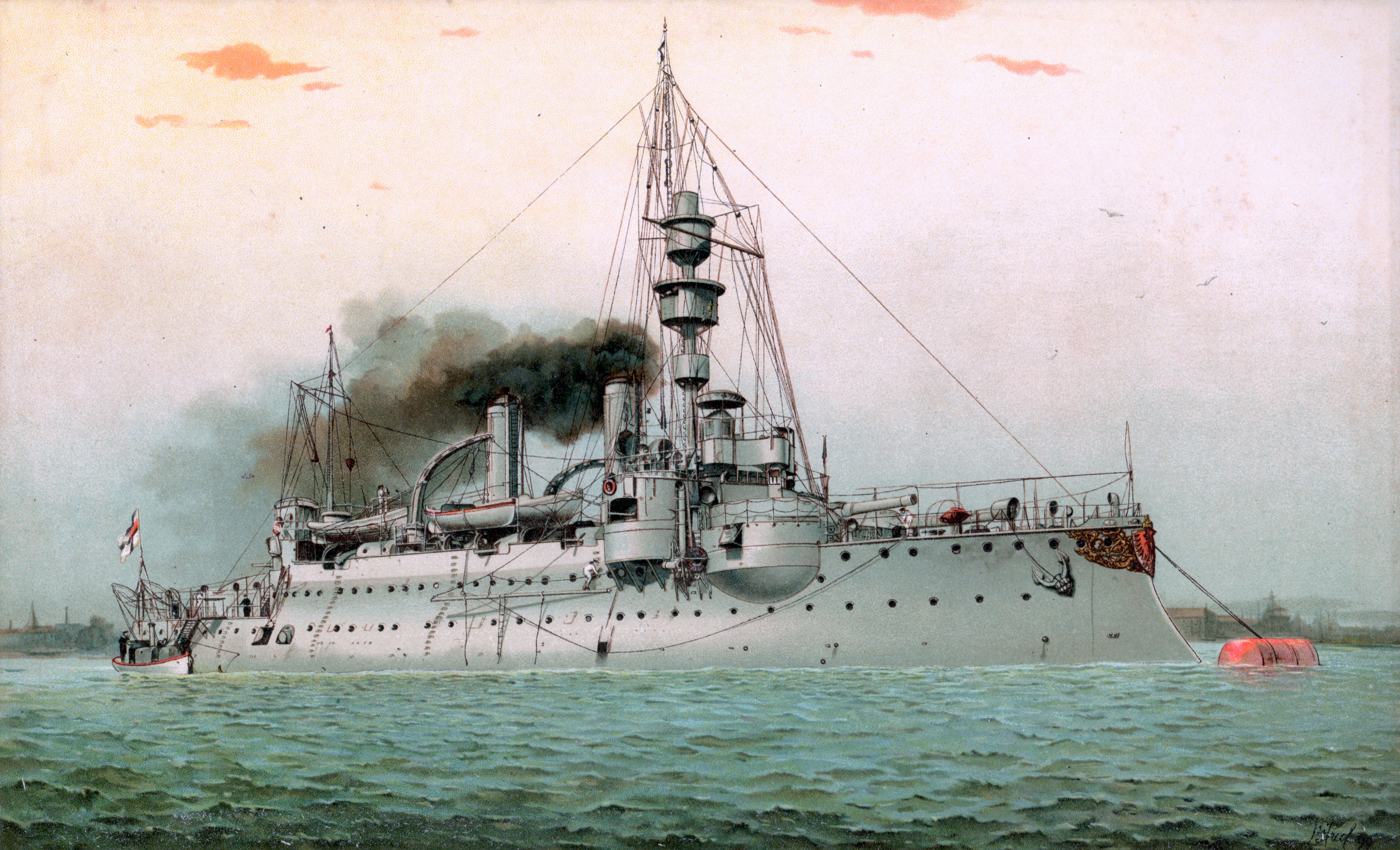
Lithograph of SMS Ägir in 1902

The Odin class, the seventh and eighth of Caprivi's proposed ten coastal defenders, was a modified version of the Siegfried design; the primary differences were a slightly improved armor layout, a second funnel, and two military masts. In 1888, before the two Odins were laid down, Caprivi's successor, Vice Admiral Alexander von Monts, ordered the construction of the four large battleships of the Brandenburg class, to replace what would have been two more Odin-class coastal defense ships; this marked the end of Germany's coastal battleship program.

The two Odin-class ships were also rebuilt, in 1901–1904, and received the same modifications as the Siegfried-class vessels. Their service histories were largely identical to the Siegfrieds; they served with the fleet from their commissioning, and were mobilized at the outbreak of war in August 1914 before being relegated to secondary duties in August 1915. Both ships were rebuilt as merchantmen after the end of the war; Odin served in this capacity until she was scrapped in 1935, while Ägir's career was cut short when she ran aground off the Swedish island of Gotland in December 1929.

Summary of the Odin class
| Ship | Armament | Armor | Displacement | Propulsion | Service | | |
| Ship | Armament | Armor | Displacement | Propulsion | Laid down | Commissioned | Fate |
|---|---|---|---|---|---|---|---|
| Odin | 3 × 24 cm guns | 240 mm | 3,754 t (3,695 long tons) | 2 shafts, 2 triple expansion engines, 15 kn | 1893 | 22 September 1896 | Scrapped, 1935 |
| Ägir | 3 × 24 cm guns | 240 mm | 3,754 t (3,695 long tons) | 2 shafts, 2 triple expansion engines, 15 kn | 1892 | 15 October 1896 | Wrecked, 8 December 1929 |

== See also ==
- List of ironclads
