= SMS Ägir =

Coastal defense ship of the German Imperial Navy

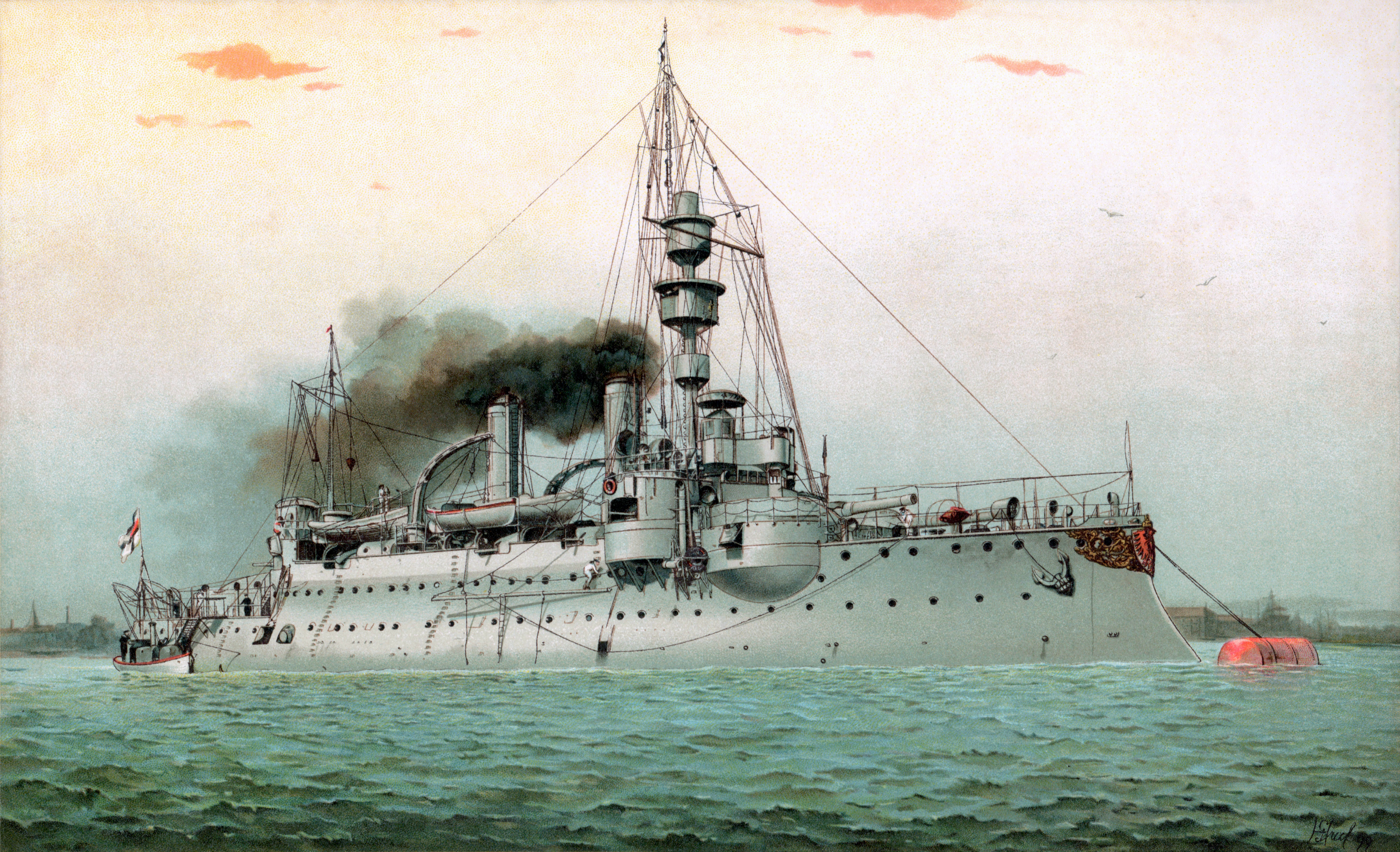
- Lithograph of Ägir in 1899

History

German Empire
- Name: SMS Ägir
- Namesake: Ægir
- Builder: Kaiserliche Werft, Kiel
- Laid down: 28 November 1892
- Launched: 3 April 1895
- Commissioned: 15 October 1896
- Decommissioned: 14 January 1916
- Stricken: 17 June 1919
- Fate: Beached at Gotland, 8 December 1929

General characteristics
- Class & type: Odin-class coastal defense ship
- Displacement: Normal: 3,550 t (3,490 long tons); Full load: 3,754 t (3,695 long tons)
- Length: 79 m (259 ft 2 in)
- Beam: 15.20 m (49 ft 10 in)
- Draft: 5.61 m (18 ft 5 in)
- Installed power: 8 × Thornycroft boilers; 4,800 PS (4,700 ihp)
- Propulsion: 2 × triple-expansion steam engines; 2 × screw propellers
- Speed: 15 knots (28 km/h; 17 mph)
- Range: 2,200 nmi (4,100 km; 2,500 mi) at 10 knots (19 km/h; 12 mph)
- Complement: 20 officers; 256 men
- Armament: 3 × 24 cm (9.4 in) SK L/35 guns; 8–10 × 8.8 cm (3.5 in) guns; 3–4 × 45 cm (17.7 in) torpedo tubes
- Armor: Belt armor: 240 mm (9.4 in); Deck: 70 mm (2.8 in); Conning tower: 120 mm (4.7 in)

SMS Ägir (Note: "SMS" stands for "Seiner Majestät Schiff", or "His Majesty's Ship".) was the second and final member of the Odin class of coastal defense ships (Küstenpanzerschiffe) built for the Imperial German Navy. She had one sister ship, Odin. Ägir was named for the norse god, and was built by the Kaiserliche Werft (Imperial Shipyard) in Danzig between 1893 and 1896. She was armed with a main battery of three 24-centimeter (9.4 in) guns. She served in the German fleet throughout the 1890s and was rebuilt in 1901–1903. She served in the VI Battle Squadron after the outbreak of World War I in August 1914, but saw no action. Ägir was demobilized in 1915 and used as a tender thereafter. After the war, she was rebuilt as a merchant ship and served in this capacity until December 1929, when she was wrecked on the island of Gotland.

== Design ==
Ägir underway

In the late 1880s, the German Kaiserliche Marine (Imperial Navy) grappled with the problem of what type of capital ship to build in the face of limited naval budgets (owing to parliamentary objections to naval spending and the cost of dredging the Kaiser Wilhelm Canal). General Leo von Caprivi, the new Chef der Admiralität (Chief of the Admiralty), was able to secure approval from the Reichstag (Imperial Diet) for ten small coastal defense ships, the first six of which became the Siegfried class, which carried three main battery guns in individual barbette mounts. Proposals for the last four included redesigning the vessels to add another main battery gun in two-gun turrets came to nothing owing to the cost of other naval programs—most notably the Brandenburg-class battleships. The two Odin-class ships were ultimately built to a modified version of the Siegfried design that incorporated improvements to the armor layout and other minor changes. They carried their armament in an unusual layout, with two heavy guns forward that could be independently aimed; tactical doctrine of the day envisioned the ships breaking through an enemy line of battle (as the Austrians had done at the Battle of Lissa in 1866), and the arrangement would have allowed each ship to engage multiple targets.

Ägir was 79 meters (259 ft 2 in) long overall and had a beam of 15.20 m (49 ft 10 in) and a maximum draft of 5.61 m (18 ft 5 in). She displaced 3,550 t (3,490 long tons) normally and up to 3,754 t (3,695 long tons) at full load. Her propulsion system consisted of two vertical 3-cylinder triple-expansion steam engines. Steam for the engines was provided by eight coal-fired Thornycroft boilers. The ship's propulsion system provided a top speed of 15 knots (28 km/h; 17 mph) from 4,800 metric horsepower (4,700 ihp), though she exceeded both figures slightly on speed tests. She carried 370 t (360 long tons; 410 short tons) of coal, which gave her a range of approximately 1,490 nautical miles (2,760 km; 1,710 mi) at 10 knots (19 km/h; 12 mph). Because she had twice the number of electrical generators as her sister, Ägir was nicknamed "Elektrische Anna" (Electric Anna). The ship had a crew of 20 officers and 256 enlisted men.

The ship was armed with three 24 cm (9.4 in) K L/35 guns mounted in three single-gun barbettes fitted with gun shields. Two were placed side by side forward, and the third was located aft of the main superstructure. They were supplied with a total of 204 rounds of ammunition. The ship was also equipped with a secondary battery of ten 8.8 cm (3.5 in) SK L/30 guns in single mounts spaced along the center part of the vessel, five guns per broadside. Ägir also carried three 45 cm (17.7 in) torpedo tubes, two in swivel mounts on the deck amidships and one in the bow, submerged below the waterline. The ship was protected by an armored belt that was 240 mm (9.4 in) thick in the central citadel, and an armored deck that was 70 mm (2.8 in) thick. The conning tower had 120 mm (4.7 in) thick sides.

=== Modifications ===
In 1903–1904, Ägir was extensively rebuilt. Her old boilers were replaced with eight new Marine type boilers and her length was increased to 86.15 m (282.6 ft). This increased her displacement to 4,376 t (4,307 long tons; 4,824 short tons) at full load. The lengthened hull, which improved her hydrodynamic shape, and the improved boilers increased her speed by a full knot, to 15.5 knots (28.7 km/h; 17.8 mph). Her coal storage was increased to 580 t (570 long tons; 640 short tons), which allowed her to steam for an additional 800 nmi (1,500 km; 920 mi). The modernization work was completed by 1903, at which point she returned to active service.

== Service history ==
=== Construction – 1899 ===
Ägir sometime before 1904

Ägir was laid down at the Kaiserliche Werft (Imperial Shipyard) in Kiel on 28 November 1892 under the contract name "T". (Note: German warships were ordered under provisional names. Additions to the fleet were given a single letter; ships intended to replace older or lost vessels were ordered as "Ersatz (name of the ship to be replaced)".) She was launched on 3 April 1895, and was christened by Kaiser Wilhelm II at the ceremony. Fitting-out work was completed by October 1896, and she was commissioned on 15 October 1896 for sea trials, which lasted until April 1897. Her commander during her trials period was Korvettenkapitän (KK—Corvette Captain) Johannes Wallmann. After completing her trials, Ägir had her crew reduced and she was assigned to the Reserve Division of the Baltic Sea, where she became the 2nd flagship on 29 September. The unit was at that time based in Kiel. In July, KK Oskar von Truppel took command of the ship for a month before her crew was again reduced in August. Upon the ship's reactivation in September, KK Max Rollmann became the ship's captain. Ägir embarked on a short training cruise to Wilhelmshaven in November.

The ship conducted shooting practice in 1898 and participated in the annual training maneuvers with the rest of the German fleet in August and September. During the exercises, which were held in the Baltic and North Seas, she served as the flagship of II Battle Squadron, which was temporarily formed for the maneuvers. The unit included her sister ship Odin and four of the Siegfried-class ships, along with the two Blitz-class avisos and a flotilla of torpedo boats. Konteradmiral (Rear Admiral) Paul Hoffmann flew his flag aboard Ägir. After the end of the exercises, KK Hugo von Pohl relieved Rollmann in October. In December, she and Odin visited Copenhagen, Denmark, on a training cruise.

From late April to 31 May 1899, Ägir was activated for operations with I Battle Squadron in place of the armored corvette Oldenburg, which had accidentally run aground and needed repairs. Ägir participated in a cruise with the rest of the squadron to Britain, where they represented Germany at an international fleet review held for Queen Victoria's 80th birthday. The ships then cruised south to visit Portugal. During a cruise in the Kattegat in June, Ägir was among the vessels that came to the assistance of the Norddeutscher Lloyd steamship SS Kaiserin Maria Theresia, which had run aground. She also helped pull free the protected cruiser Hansa, which had also grounded in the Great Belt. The next month, KK Max Bachem replaced Pohl. During the fleet maneuvers that year, Ägir served as the flagship of IV Division, II Squadron, under the command of KAdm Conrad von Bodenhausen. The ship's participation in the exercises was cut short on 28 August, when she collided with the British steamer SS Aberfoyle off Darßer Ort during a night training exercise. Aberfoyle struck Ägir below her forward main battery gun on the starboard side below the waterline in the accident, causing a serious leak. She was forced to return to the Kaiserliche Werft in Kiel for repairs. The work was completed quickly, allowing Ägir to participate in the latter stage of the maneuvers. Following the conclusion of the exercises, she returned to the Reserve Division.

=== 1900–1914 ===
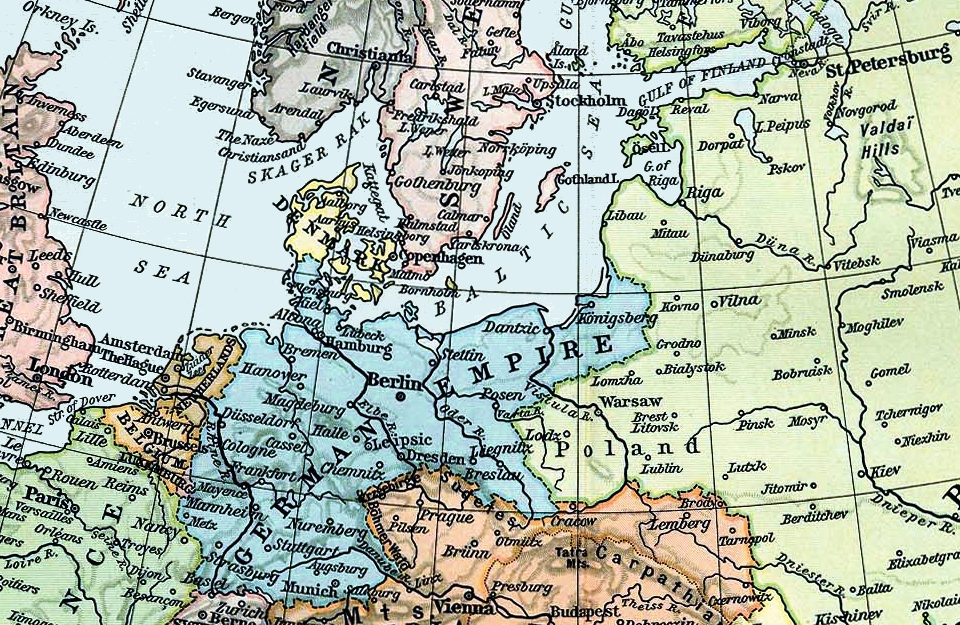
Map of the North and Baltic Seas in 1911

On 2 June, Ägir and Odin assisted the passenger liner SS Deutschland, which had run aground in the Stettiner Haff. The rest of the year passed relatively uneventfully, apart from the fleet maneuvers in August and September, as usual. On 25 September, the Reserve Division was relocated to Danzig, where Ägir was decommissioned. She continued to operate with the Reserve Division in 1901, and during its active period, the squadron was commanded by KAdm Hugo von Schuckmann, who flew his flag aboard Ägir. KK Gerhard Gerdes took command of the vessel when she was reactivated in July. While on divisional exercises in the Strander Bucht on 6 August, Ägir suffered a boiler room fire that badly injured five crewmen. II Squadron was reformed for the fleet maneuvers later that month, and Ägir resumed her role as the squadron flagship for Vizeadmiral (Vice Admiral) Volkmar von Arnim. The ship was initially delayed from participating in the exercises by machinery problems. After the exercises concluded in mid-September, Ägir returned to the Reserve Division of the Baltic. KK von Witzleben replaced Gerdes after the maneuvers, and in October, Ägir embarked on a training cruise in the western Baltic along the coast of East Prussia.

In April 1902, Ägir conducted torpedo practice with the coastal defense ship Hagenin the Bay of Kiel. Another training cruise in the Baltic followed in May, by which time KK Hartwig von Dassel had relieved Witzleben temporarily. In June, Witzleben had returned to the vessel, and she went to visit Larvik, Norway. She had returned to Danzig by 30 June, where she was decommissioned for an extensive reconstruction at the Kaiserliche Werft there. The work began in February 1903 and concluded in September 1904. The ship was recommissioned on 10 October and returned to her old unit, which had by this time been expanded into a full squadron. She conducted sea trials through March 1905. During this period, she was assigned to the Naval Artillery Inspectorate along with the coastal defense ship Frithjof to serve as training ships for gunnery and torpedo practice. On 2 April, after a cruise in the Baltic, Ägir stopped in Danzig, where her crew assisted in the suppression of a fire at the Klawitter shipyard. Over the following months, she took part in the cruises and training exercises with the other training vessels of the fleet.

In July, the ship took part in experiments with various devices to measure weather and air currents. In June and July, Ägir joined the fleet for a summer cruise to visit numerous ports in Norway, Sweden, and Denmark. From 20 to 24 July, she stopped in Copenhagen with the rest of the fleet. The ship took part in the fleet maneuvers in August and September as usual, after which KK Hugo Louran became the ship's commander. In November she made a short training cruise from Danzig to Kiel. The year 1906 followed the same pattern, including exercises with the fleet's training ships in the first half of the year, a cruise to Norway in July, and the large-scale maneuvers in August and September. KK Maximilian Rogge served as the ship's commander from March to September. He was thereafter replaced by KK Walter Engelhardt. In mid-December, Ägir towed the tanker SS Geestemünde, which had struck an uncharted shoal off the Vistula estuary. For the next three years, the ship's activity consisted primarily of training exercises; during this period, she was assigned to III Battle Squadron, which was at that time temporarily established each year for the annual fleet maneuvers. Engelhardt remained the ship's captain until March 1909, when KK Friedrich Kloebe relieved him. On 15 September 1909, Ägir was decommissioned in Danzig and was assigned to the inactive reserve fleet.

=== World War I ===
An unidentified member of the Siegfried or Odin class on patrol during World War I, c. 1915

Following the outbreak of World War I in July 1914, Ägir was mobilized for wartime service. She was recommissioned on 12 August and assigned to VI Battle Squadron with the other seven coastal defense ships of the Odin and Siegfried classes. Ägir briefly served as the flagship of the squadron's deputy commander, RAdm Ehler Behring before he was transferred to command a different unit in the Baltic. The ships of VI Squadron conducted readiness training for the next month, and on 14 September they were transferred to the North Sea to guard Germany's coast. For the next several months, the ships alternated between the mouth of the Weser river and Jade Bay, the latter being the location of Germany's primary naval base in the North Sea, Wilhelmshaven. In December, the squadron flagship, Hildebrand, went to assist the steamer Answald, which had run aground in the outer Jade; Hildebrand grounded as well and was seriously damaged. While Hildebrand was in drydock for repairs, Ägir became the squadron flagship.

On 31 August 1915, the squadron was disbanded, and the next day Ägir was assigned to the harbor flotilla based in the Weser. She remained in service until 14 January 1916, when she was decommissioned in Wilhelmshaven. She was then disarmed and converted into a barracks ship for shipyard workers in Wilhelmshaven, a role she filled to the end of the war.

=== Postwar conversion and wreckage ===
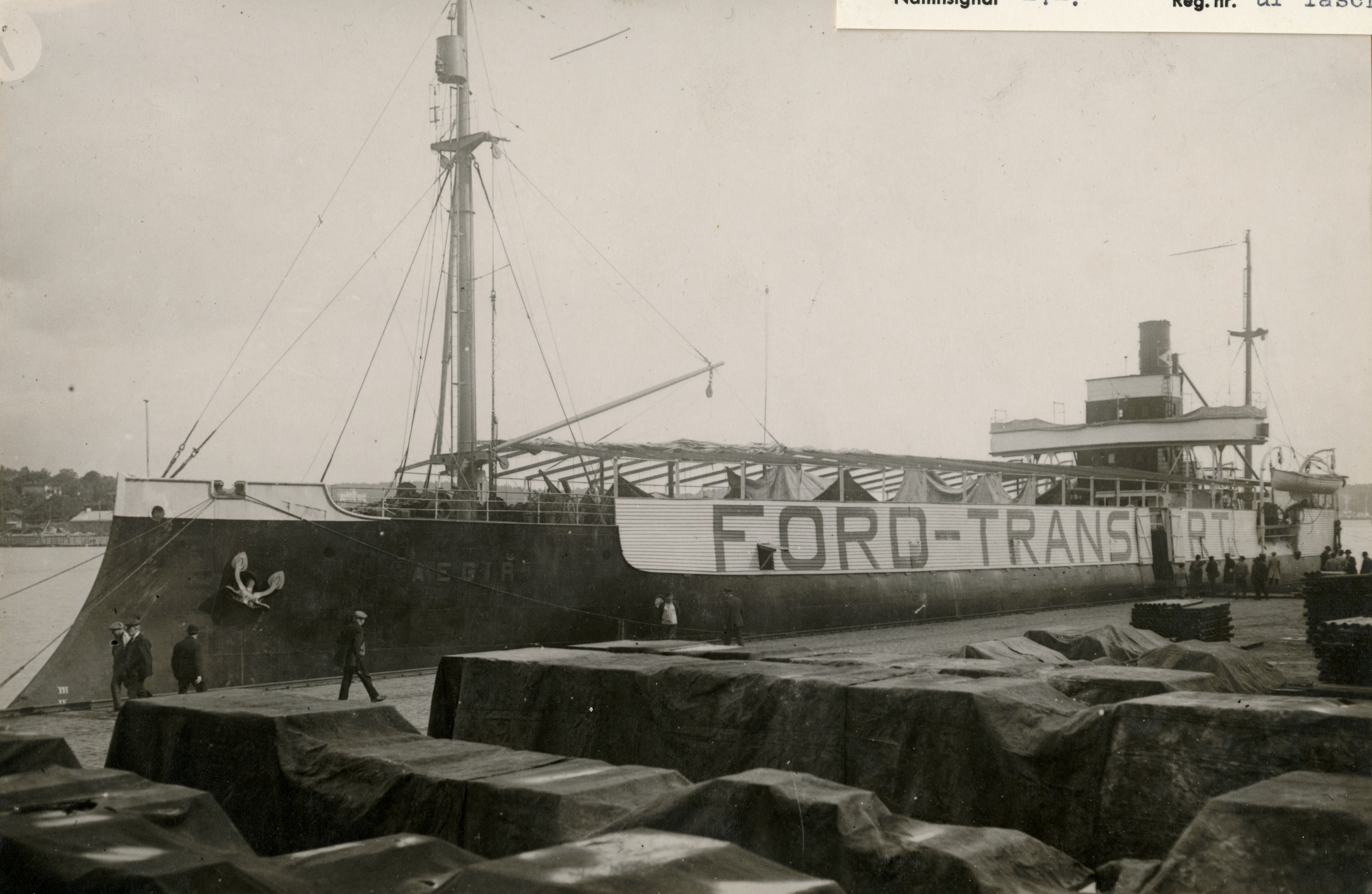
Photo from the 1920s of Ägir after her conversion into a merchant vessel

Following Germany's defeat in November 1918, Ägir was stricken from the naval register on 17 June 1919. The navy thereafter sold the ship to be converted into a merchant vessel; the work was done at the Deutsche Werke shipyard in Rüstringen. She was operated by A. Bernstein Co., out of Hamburg, and was used to ship train engines to Leningrad, Soviet Union.

Her last journey was transporting Ford cars and parts for cars and motorcycles from England to Stockholm and Helsinki. On 6 December 1929, she ran aground in thick fog south of Stora Karlsö just west of Gotland. Two salvage boats quickly reached her, but as she was firmly lodged on the shallows the captain turned them down and preferred to wait for assistance from Germany. Two days later, the weather changed into a storm that tore a hole in the bottom of the ship, which began to sink. Personnel at Stora Karlsö Lighthouse managed to save 15 of the crew members before the ship was lost on 8 December; three more were saved in a lifeboat. Most of the cargo was eventually salvaged.

Her bow ornament is preserved at the Laboe Naval Memorial.
