= SMS Odin =

Coastal defense ship of the German Imperial Navy

- A 1902 lithograph of Odin firing a salute

History

German Empire
- Name: Odin
- Namesake: Odin
- Builder: Kaiserliche Werft in Danzig
- Laid down: 15 March 1893
- Launched: 3 November 1894
- Commissioned: 22 September 1896
- Decommissioned: 16 January 1916
- Stricken: 6 December 1919
- Fate: Scrapped, 1935

General characteristics
- Class & type: Odin-class coastal defense ship
- Displacement: Normal: 3,550 t (3,490 long tons); Full load: 3,754 t (3,695 long tons)
- Length: 79 m (259.2 ft)
- Beam: 15.20 m (49.9 ft)
- Draft: 5.61 m (18.4 ft)
- Installed power: 4 × fire-tube boilers; 4,800 PS (4,700 ihp)
- Propulsion: 2 × triple-expansion steam engines; 2 × screw propellers
- Speed: 14.4 knots (26.7 km/h; 16.6 mph)
- Range: 2,200 nmi (4,100 km; 2,500 mi) at 10 knots (19 km/h; 12 mph)
- Complement: 20 officers; 256 enlisted men
- Armament: 3 × 24 cm (9.4 in) guns; 10 × 8.8 cm (3.5 in) guns; 3 × 45 cm (17.7 in) torpedo tubes
- Armor: Belt armor: 240 mm (9.4 in); Deck: 70 mm (2.8 in); Conning tower: 120 mm (4.7 in)

SMS Odin (Note: "SMS" stands for "Seiner Majestät Schiff", or "His Majesty's Ship".) was the lead ship of her class of coastal defense ships (Küstenpanzerschiffe) built for the Imperial German Navy. She had one sister ship, Ägir. Odin, named for the eponymous Norse god, was built by the Kaiserliche Werft (Imperial Shipyard) in Danzig between 1893 and 1896, and was armed with a main battery of three 24-centimeter (9.4 in) guns. She served in the German fleet throughout the 1890s and was rebuilt in 1901–1903. She served in the VI Battle Squadron after the outbreak of World War I in August 1914, but saw no action. Odin was demobilized in 1915 and used as a tender thereafter. After the war, she was rebuilt as a merchant ship and served in this capacity until 1935, when she was broken up for scrap.

== Design ==
In the late 1880s, the German Kaiserliche Marine grappled with the problem of what type of capital ship to build in the face of limited naval budgets (owing to parliamentary objections to naval spending and the cost of dredging the Kaiser Wilhelm Canal). General Leo von Caprivi, the new Chef der Admiralität (Chief of the Admiralty), was able to secure approval from the Reichstag (Imperial Diet) for ten small coastal defense ships, the first six of which became the Siegfried class, which carried three main battery guns in individual barbette mounts. Proposals for the last four included redesigning the vessels to add another main battery gun in two-gun turrets came to nothing owing to the cost of other naval programs—most notably the Brandenburg-class battleships. The two Odin-class ships were ultimately built to a modified version of the Siegfried design that incorporated improvements to the armor layout and other minor changes. They carried their armament in an unusual layout, with two heavy guns forward that could be independently aimed; tactical doctrine of the day envisioned the ships breaking through an enemy line of battle (as the Austrians had done at the Battle of Lissa in 1866), and the arrangement would have allowed each ship to engage multiple targets.

Odin was 79 meters (259 ft) long overall and had a beam of 15.20 m (49.9 ft) and a maximum draft of 5.61 m (18.4 ft). She displaced 3,550 t (3,490 long tons) normally and up to 3,754 t (3,695 long tons) at full load. Her propulsion system consisted of two vertical 3-cylinder triple-expansion steam engines. Steam for the engines was provided by four coal-fired boilers that were vented through a single funnel. The ship's propulsion system were rated for a top speed of 15 knots (28 km/h; 17 mph) from 4,800 metric horsepower (4,700 ihp), though she failed to reach either figure in service, making just 14.4 knots (26.7 km/h; 16.6 mph) during her initial speed tests. She carried 370 t (360 long tons; 410 short tons) of coal, which gave her a range of approximately 1,490 nautical miles (2,760 km; 1,710 mi) at 10 knots (19 km/h; 12 mph). Odin had a crew of 20 officers and 256 enlisted men.

The ship was armed with three 24 cm (9.4 in) K L/35 guns mounted in three single-gun barbettes fitted with gun shields. Two were placed side by side forward, and the third was located aft of the main superstructure. They were supplied with a total of 204 rounds of ammunition. The ship was also equipped with a secondary battery of ten 8.8 cm (3.5 in) SK L/30 guns in single mounts spaced along the center part of the vessel, five guns per broadside. Odin also carried three 45 cm (17.7 in) torpedo tubes, two in swivel mounts on the deck amidships and one in the bow, submerged below the waterline. The ship was protected by an armored belt that was 240 mm (9.4 in) thick in the central citadel, and an armored deck that was 70 mm (2.8 in) thick. The conning tower had 120 mm (4.7 in) thick sides.

=== Modifications ===
Odin was heavily rebuilt in 1901–1903. Her old boilers were replaced with eight new Marine type boilers and her length was increased to 86.15 m (282.6 ft). This increased her displacement to 4,376 t (4,307 long tons; 4,824 short tons) at full load. The lengthened hull, which improved her hydrodynamic shape, and the improved boilers increased her speed by a full knot, to 15.5 knots (28.7 km/h; 17.8 mph). Her coal storage was increased to 580 t (570 long tons; 640 short tons), which allowed her to steam for an additional 800 nmi (1,500 km; 920 mi). The modernization work was completed by 1903, at which point she returned to active service.

== Service history ==
=== Peacetime career ===
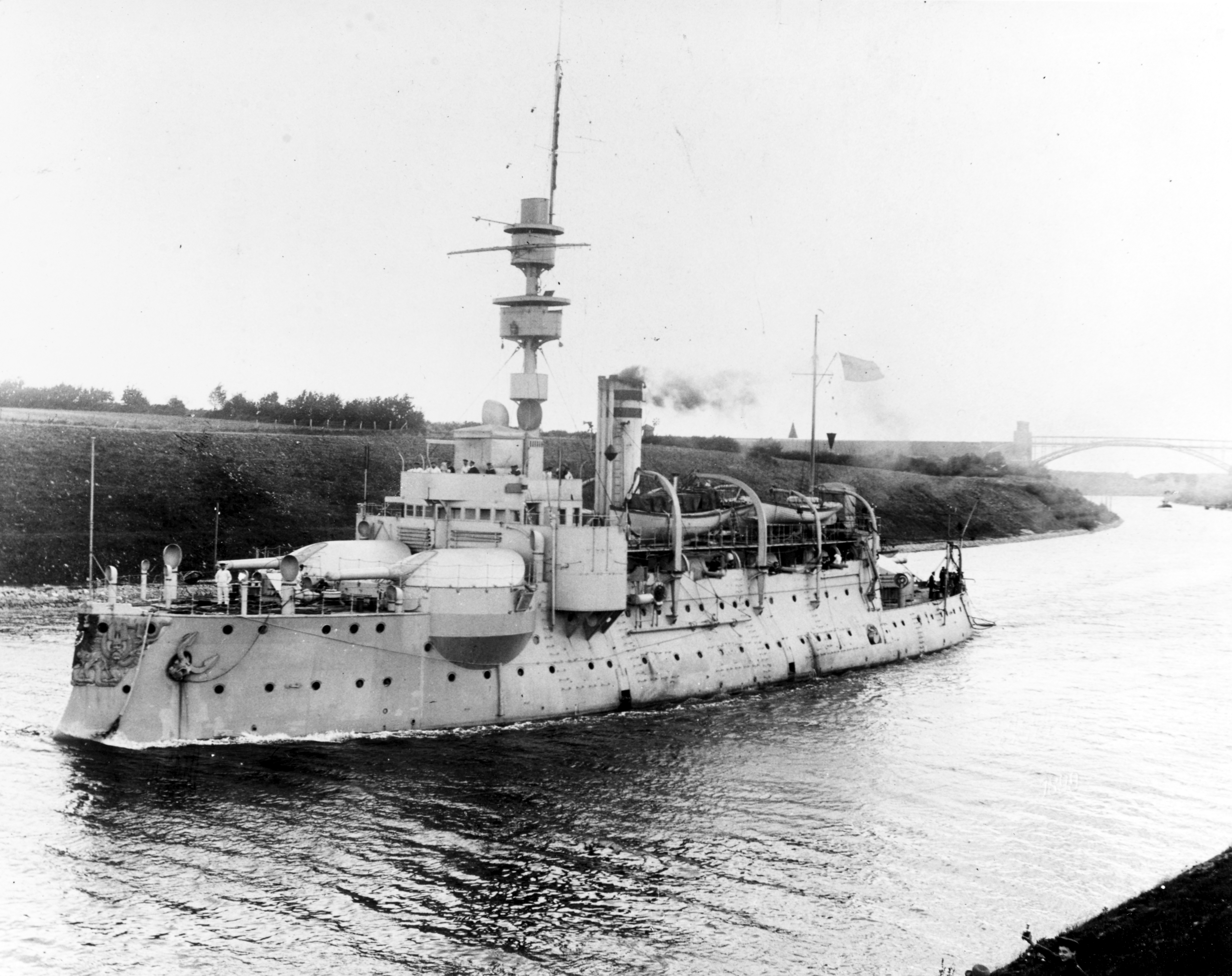
Odin in 1899 before her reconstruction

Odin was laid down at the Kaiserliche Werft (Imperial Shipyard) in Danzig on 15 March 1893, under the provisional designation "V". (Note: German warships were ordered under provisional names. Additions to the fleet were given a single letter; ships intended to replace older or lost vessels were ordered as "Ersatz (name of the ship to be replaced)".) She was launched on 3 November 1894, and the shipyard director, Kapitän zur See (Captain at Sea) Graf von Haugwitz, christened the ship after the Norse deity Odin at the ceremony. The ship was completed on 7 July 1896, after which sea trials commenced. She was commissioned into the German fleet on 22 September 1896, under the command of Korvettenkapitän (KK—Corvette Captain) Johannes Wallmann, and she completed acceptance trials two days later. Final modifications were made over the course of the following month, along with further tests, and on 14 October she was assigned to the Reserve Division of the Baltic Sea, based in Kiel.

On 26 July 1898, Odin was recommissioned to take part in the annual fleet maneuvers; she was assigned to II Battle Squadron of the Home Fleet, which was temporarily organized for the exercises with the ships of the reserve divisions. In early December, she embarked on a training cruise to Christiania, Norway. The year 1899 followed the same pattern; she spent the first half of the year in the Reserve Division, and was assigned to II Division for the annual maneuvers. She conducted a winter training cruise to Copenhagen, Denmark, and Apenrade and Swinemünde, Germany. While cruising in the Kattegat, she came to the assistance of the Norddeutscher Lloyd steamer SS Kaiserin Maria Theresia, which had run aground. She also helped pull free the protected cruiser Hansa, which had also grounded in the Great Belt.

In February 1900, Kapitänleutnant (Captain Lieutenant) Wilhelm Souchon briefly commanded the ship. Odin conducted wireless telegraphy experiments with the armored cruiser Friedrich Carl on 20 March 1900. In June, she came to the assistance of the HAPAG steamer SS Deutschland, which had grounded off Stettin. For the fleet maneuvers she returned to II Squadron, thereafter returning to the Reserve Division on 8 October; the unit was at that time relocated from Kiel to Danzig. During that period, she served as the 2nd flagship of the division. The next year, Odin spent the first half of the year conducting various training activities, including shooting practice, and an overhaul. She was present for the Kiel Week sailing regatta in June, and on 1 August, she returned to II Squadron for the annual maneuvers. Following their conclusion, she was decommissioned in Danzig on 21 September for an extensive reconstruction; she was the last member of either her class or the Siegfried class to be so modernized. The work was carried out at the Kaiserliche Werft there. The modernization work was completed in 1903.

The ship was recommissioned on 2 October and assigned to II Squadron; by that time, the fleet had been reorganized as the Active Battle Fleet. She thereafter embarked on a tour with the unit that visited a number of ports in Norway and in Scotland. During the voyage, on the way to Lerwick, Scotland, Odin accidentally rammed the torpedo boat S98, badly damaging her. After participating in the normal training routine in 1904, which concluded with the fleet maneuvers in August and September, Odin was removed from the unit on 15 September, her place in the squadron having been taken by the new pre-dreadnought battleship Braunschweig. Odin was decommissioned on 10 October in Danzig and assigned to what was now the Reserve Squadron of the Baltic Sea. She was reactivated once more from July to September 1909 for the fleet maneuvers that year. During that period, KK Ernst Goette served as the ship's captain.

=== World War I ===
An unidentified member of the Siegfried or Odin class on patrol during World War I, c. 1915

Following the outbreak of World War I in July 1914, Odin was recommissioned on 12 August as part of the general mobilization for war. She was assigned to VI Battle Squadron, along with her sister Ägir and the six Siegfried-class coastal defense ships. After completing their mobilization, the unit was initially deployed to guard Germany's North Sea coast on 15 September, alternating between the mouth of the Weser river and the Jade Bay, where Wilhelmshaven, Germany's primary naval base in the North Sea, was located. The squadron remained on station until 31 August 1915, when it was disbanded, and its ships dispersed. Odin continued to patrol in the area, being assigned to the harbor defense flotilla in the mouth of the Ems river the following day.

Odin was eventually withdrawn from front line service on 9 January 1916, and was thereafter sent to Danzig, where she was decommissioned on 16 January. Her crew was transferred to other vessels and Odin was used as a barracks ship in Wilhelmshaven through to the end of the war. She initially supported the U-boats of I U-boat Flotilla until 25 July 1917, when she was transferred to III U-boat Flotilla. Following Germany's defeat in November 1918, she was used to support IV Minesweeping Flotilla during its efforts to clear the North Sea of naval mines. Odin was stricken from the naval register on 6 December 1919 and sold. In 1922, she was rebuilt as a merchant ship at the Deutsche Werke shipyard in Rüstringen. She was operated by Arnold Bernstein Co., out of Hamburg. She continued in this role until 1935, still under her original name, when she was broken up for scrap.
