= Odin-class coastal defense ship =

Coastal defense ship class of the German Imperial Navy

- A 1902 lithograph of Odin firing a salute

Class overview
- Name: Odin class
- Operators: Imperial German Navy
- Preceded by: Siegfried class
- Succeeded by: None
- Built: 1893–1896
- In commission: 1896–1919
- Completed: 2
- Lost: 1
- Retired: 1

General characteristics
- Type: Coastal defense ship
- Displacement: Normal: 3,550 t (3,490 long tons); Full load: 3,754 t (3,695 long tons)
- Length: 79 m (259 ft 2 in)
- Beam: 15.20 m (49 ft 10 in)
- Draft: 5.61 m (18.4 ft)
- Installed power: 4 × fire-tube boilers; 4,800 PS (4,700 ihp)
- Propulsion: 2 × triple-expansion steam engines; 2 × screw propellers
- Speed: 15 knots (28 km/h; 17 mph)
- Range: 2,290 nautical miles (4,240 km; 2,640 mi) at 10 knots (19 km/h; 12 mph)
- Crew: 20 officers; 256 enlisted men
- Armament: 3 × 24 cm (9.4 in) K L/35 guns; 10 × 8.8 cm (3.46 in) SK L/30 guns; 3 × 45 cm (18 in) torpedo tubes
- Armor: Belt armor: 240 mm (9.4 in); Deck: 70 mm (2.8 in); Conning tower: 120 mm (4.7 in)

The Odin class was a pair of coastal defense ships built for the German Kaiserliche Marine (Imperial Navy) in the late 19th century. The class comprised two ships: Odin, named after the Norse god Odin, and Ägir, named after the Norse god of the same name. The ships were very similar to the preceding Siegfried-class coastal defense ships, and are sometimes considered to be one class of ships.

Like the preceding Siegfried-class ships, Odin and Ägir were obsolete by the time World War I had started. Regardless, they were still used in their primary role until 1915, at which point they were withdrawn from active service. The ships performed a variety of secondary duties until the end of the war. On 17 June 1919, both ships were struck from the naval register and sold to the A. Bernstein Company in Hamburg. The shipping company had the ships rebuilt as freighters; Odin served in this capacity until she was scrapped in 1935, however Ägir accidentally grounded near the Karlsö lighthouse on the island of Gotland in 1929 and proved to be a total loss.

== Design ==
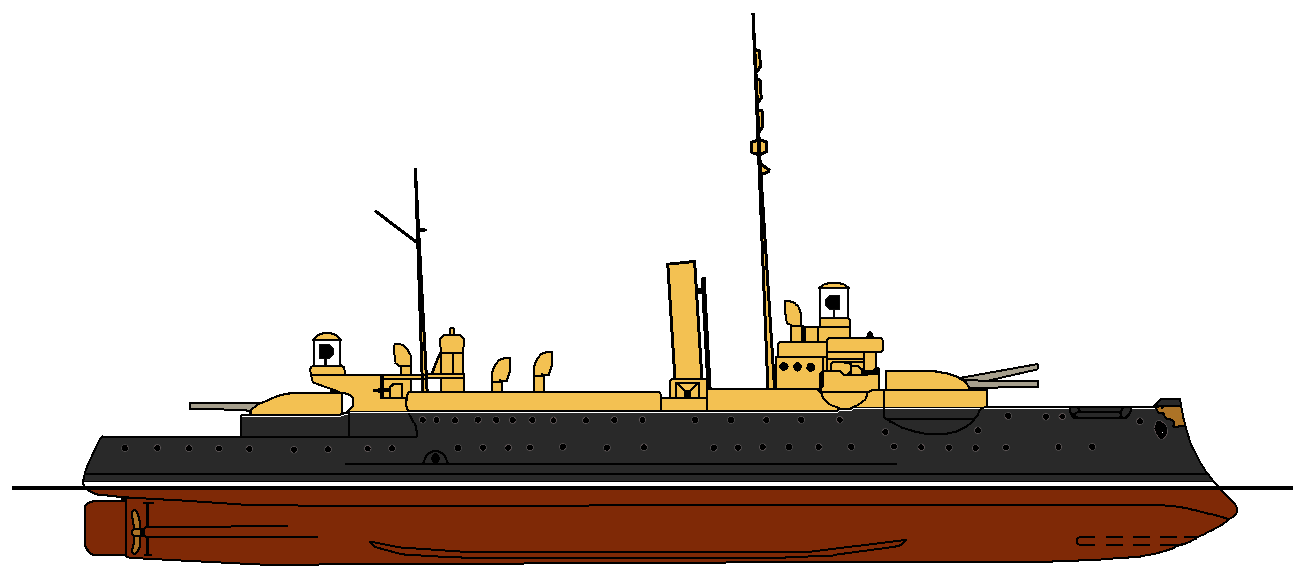
Illustration of Siegfried as originally configured

In the late 1880s, the German Kaiserliche Marine grappled with the problem of what type of capital ship to build in the face of limited naval budgets (owing to parliamentary objections to naval spending and the cost of dredging the Kaiser Wilhelm Canal). General Leo von Caprivi, the new Chef der Admiralität (Chief of the Admiralty), requested a series of design proposals, which ranged in size from small 2,500-long-ton (2,500 t) coastal defense ships armed with a battery of two 21 cm (8.3 in) guns to heavily armed 9,800-long-ton (10,000 t) ocean-going battleships equipped with seven 30.5 cm (12 in) guns. Caprivi ordered ten coastal defense ships to guard the entrances to the canal, since even opponents of the navy in the Reichstag (Imperial Diet) agreed that such vessels were necessary. The initial design, the Siegfried class, was based on the smallest proposal but scaled up to add a third main battery gun, the caliber of which was increased from 21 cm to 24 cm (9.4 in). Two of these guns were carried in shielded barbettes side-by-side forward, as German naval theorists still favored ramming attacks that required a capability for end-on fire.

By the time the next group of ships were to be ordered to complete Caprivi's program in 1892, naval theorists had shifted away from end-on attacks toward traditional line-ahead tactics that required a heavy broadside. At the same time, the German navy had begun building the Brandenburg-class battleships that reflected this evolution in naval thinking. Caprivi had resigned in 1889, and following a reorganization of the German naval command structure by Kaiser Wilhelm II, Friedrich von Hollmann, the State Secretary of the Reichsmarineamt (RMA), was now in control of naval construction. Hollmann considered proposals to redesign what was to become the Odin class into a more traditional pre-dreadnought arrangement: a fourth 24 cm gun would be added, but rather than the individual barbettes, the guns would be carried in a pair of twin-gun turrets, one forward and one aft. The full length belt armor would be reduced to a short belt capped with armored transverse bulkheads to offset the weight of the additional gun. New, more effective Krupp armor would be employed to save weight as well, since less steel could be used to achieve the same level of protection.

The RMA initially planned to build four of the ships to complete the ten that the Reichstag had authorized. The proposal came to nothing, however, as the cost of the Brandenburgs proved to be twenty-five percent higher than expected. As a result, the seventh and eighth coastal defense ships—Odin and Ägir—were built to a modified version of the Siegfried design that incorporated the updated armor layout, along with other minor changes that included the installation of military masts and the omission of anti-torpedo nets. The ninth and tenth vessels, provisionally named W and X were slated for the 1893–1894 budget year but were rejected by the Reichstag.

=== General characteristics ===
The Odin-class ships were 76.40 meters (250 ft 8 in) long at the waterline and 79 m (259 ft 2 in) long overall. They had a beam of 15.20 m (49 ft 10 in) and a draft of 5.61 m (18 ft 5 in) forward and 5.47 m (17 ft 11 in) aft. Like the preceding Siegfried class, Odin and Ägir were substantially rebuilt from 1901 to 1903 and 1903 to 1904, respectively. The hulls were lengthened somewhat, to 84.80 m (278 ft 3 in) at the waterline and 86.15 m (282 ft 8 in) overall. The beam was also slightly increased, to 15.40 m (50 ft 6 in). Forward draft decreased slightly, to 5.59 m (18 ft 4 in), while the aft draft increased slightly, to 5.49 m (18 ft). The two ships had a designed displacement of 3,550 metric tons (3,490 long tons) and a maximum weight of 2,754 t (2,711 long tons). After the reconstruction, displacement was increased to 4,100 t (4,000 long tons) designed, and a maximum of 4,376 t (4,307 long tons) for Odin and 4,292 t (4,224 long tons) for Ägir.

Odin and Ägir used the same transverse and longitudinal steel frame construction as the Siegfried-class ships. The ships had eight watertight compartments and a double bottom for about 60% of the length of the hull. As in the Siegfrieds, a ninth watertight compartment was added when the ships were lengthened. Their hulls featured a pronounced tumblehome. The ships were described as good sea boats; they had gentle motion and were very responsive to commands from the helm. The ships lost significant speed in heavy seas, however. The ships had a crew of 20 officers and 256 enlisted men, with an additional 6 officers and 22 men when serving as a flagship. The refit increased crew requirements, to an additional 31 sailors normally, and the extra flagship crew increased to 9 officers and 34 men. The ships carried a number of smaller boats, including one picket boat, one pinnace, two cutters, one yawl, and one dinghy.

=== Propulsion ===
Odin in dry dock showing the arrangement of the forward guns and the bow torpedo tube

Odin and Ägir were equipped with the same propulsion system that was in Siegfried: two sets of 3-cylinder triple expansion engines, each in its own engine room. These engines drove a pair of three-bladed screws that were 3.50 m (11 ft 6 in) in diameter. Odin had eight marine type boilers, while Ägir's engines were powered by eight Thornycroft boilers. The ships had similar maximum speeds, with Odin, at 14.4 knots (26.7 km/h; 16.6 mph), somewhat slower than her design speed of 15 knots (28 km/h; 17 mph) and Ägir slightly faster at 15.1 knots (28.0 km/h; 17.4 mph). Their engines were rated at 4,800 indicated horsepower (3,600 kW), though on trials Odin managed only 4,650 ihp (3,470 kW) while Ägir reached 5,129 ihp (3,825 kW).

Odin had three electric generators that provided between 29 and 26 kilowatts at 67 volts, while Ägir was equipped with six generators that provided between 243 and 250 kW at 120 V. Because of her increased number of electrical generators, Ägir was nicknamed "Electrische Anna" ("Electric Anna"). The ships stored up to 270 t (270 long tons; 300 short tons) of coal which enabled a range of 2,200 nautical miles (4,100 km; 2,500 mi) at a cruising speed of 10 knots (19 km/h; 12 mph). After the refit, fuel bunkerage was increased, to 370 t (360 long tons; 410 short tons) of coal. This increased the sailing range to 3,000 nmi (5,600 km; 3,500 mi) at 10 knots. After 1909, capacity to store 100 t (98 long tons) of fuel oil was added.

=== Armament ===
The ships' primary armament consisted of three 24-centimeter (9.4 in) K L/35 guns. In an arrangement that was very unusual for such large guns, two of the guns were mounted in a pair of MPL C/88 barbettes forward side-by-side, while the third was mounted in a single barbette aft. The guns could train 150 degrees to either side of the centerline, and depress to -4 degrees and elevate to 25 degrees. This enabled a maximum range of 13,000 m (14,000 yd). The guns had an ammunition storage of 174 rounds, or 58 shells per gun. The guns had a rate of fire of around 2 shells per minute. The 1895 design for the armor-piercing shell weighed 140 kg (310 lb).

The ships also had a secondary battery of ten 8.8 cm (3.46 in) SK L/30 guns with 2,500 rounds of ammunition. The 8.8 cm gun fired a 10 kg (22 lb) projectile at a muzzle velocity of 590 m/s (1,900 ft/s). The guns could sustain a rate of fire of approximately 15 rounds per minute. The ships were also equipped with three 45 cm (18 in) torpedo tubes. Two were placed laterally in above water swivel mounts and the third was submerged in the bow. The torpedo tubes were supplied with a total of 8 torpedoes.

=== Armor ===
The ships used a similar Krupp compound steel and teak armor protection scheme as in the preceding Siegfried class. The upper section of the main armored belt was 220 millimeters (8.7 in) thick in the central citadel of the ships, where the ships' vitals were located. Behind this was 180 mm (7.1 in) of teak, which gave a total thickness of 400 mm (16 in). The bow and stern were unprotected. The lower section followed a similar pattern of steel armor distribution, although the thickness of the central portion of the belt was decreased to 120 mm (4.7 in). The main armored deck was between 50 mm (2.0 in) and 70 mm (2.8 in) thick; more important areas of the ships were covered by the thicker armor. The conning tower roof was 30 mm (1.2 in) thick and the sides were 120 mm (4.7 in). The barbettes for the main battery and cupolas for the secondary guns ranged in thickness between 30 and 200 mm (1.2 and 7.9 in), backed by 200 mm (7.9 in) of teak.

== Ships in class ==
Ship name	Commissioned	Decommissioned	Fate
Odin	22 September 1896	31 August 1915	Sold for scrap, 1935
Ägir	15 October 1896	14 January 1916	Wrecked, 8 December 1929

== Service history ==
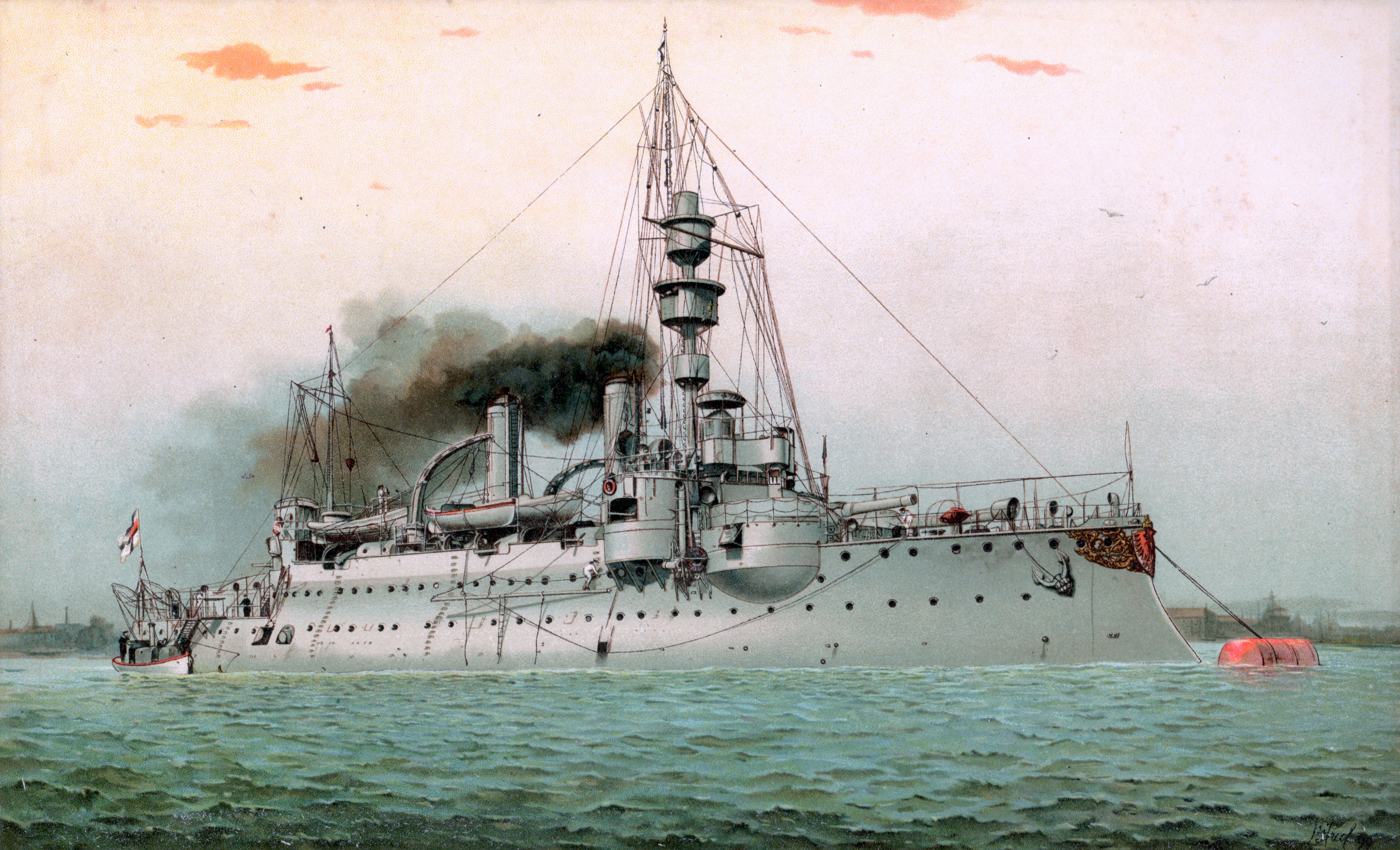
Lithograph of Ägir in 1902

Odin and Ägir saw only limited service in their intended roles. The revolutions in capital ship building in the first decade of the 20th century rapidly made these ships obsolete. The Second Naval Law, passed on 27 March 1908, reduced the service life of all capital ships from 25 years to 20 years. This meant that the Odin-class ships, along with a number of other vessels, were to be replaced as soon as possible. Odin and Ägir were replaced by the Kaiser-class battleships König Albert and Prinzregent Luitpold respectively.

As the new battleships were intended for offensive operations, the Odin class was still retained for coast defense duties. The ships served in this capacity through the start of World War I, until they were withdrawn from active service in 1915, along with their half-sisters of the Siegfried class. After she was pulled from combat duties, Odin served as a tender in Wilhelmshaven. She was struck from the naval register on 6 December 1919 and sold to A. Bernstein Co., a shipping company based in Hamburg. By 1922, the ship had been rebuilt as a freighter, and she served in this capacity until she was scrapped in 1935.

Ägir was also stationed in Wilhelmshaven after she was withdrawn from her coast defense duties, though she served as a barracks ship there. She was stricken from the navy list on 17 June 1919, and also sold to A. Bernstein Co. for use as a freighter. On 8 December 1929, the ship grounded off the Karlsö lighthouse on the Swedish island of Gotland. The situation proved to be unsalvageable. Her bow ornament is now on display at the Laboe Naval Memorial.
