= Brandenburg-class battleship =

Battleship class of the German Imperial Navy

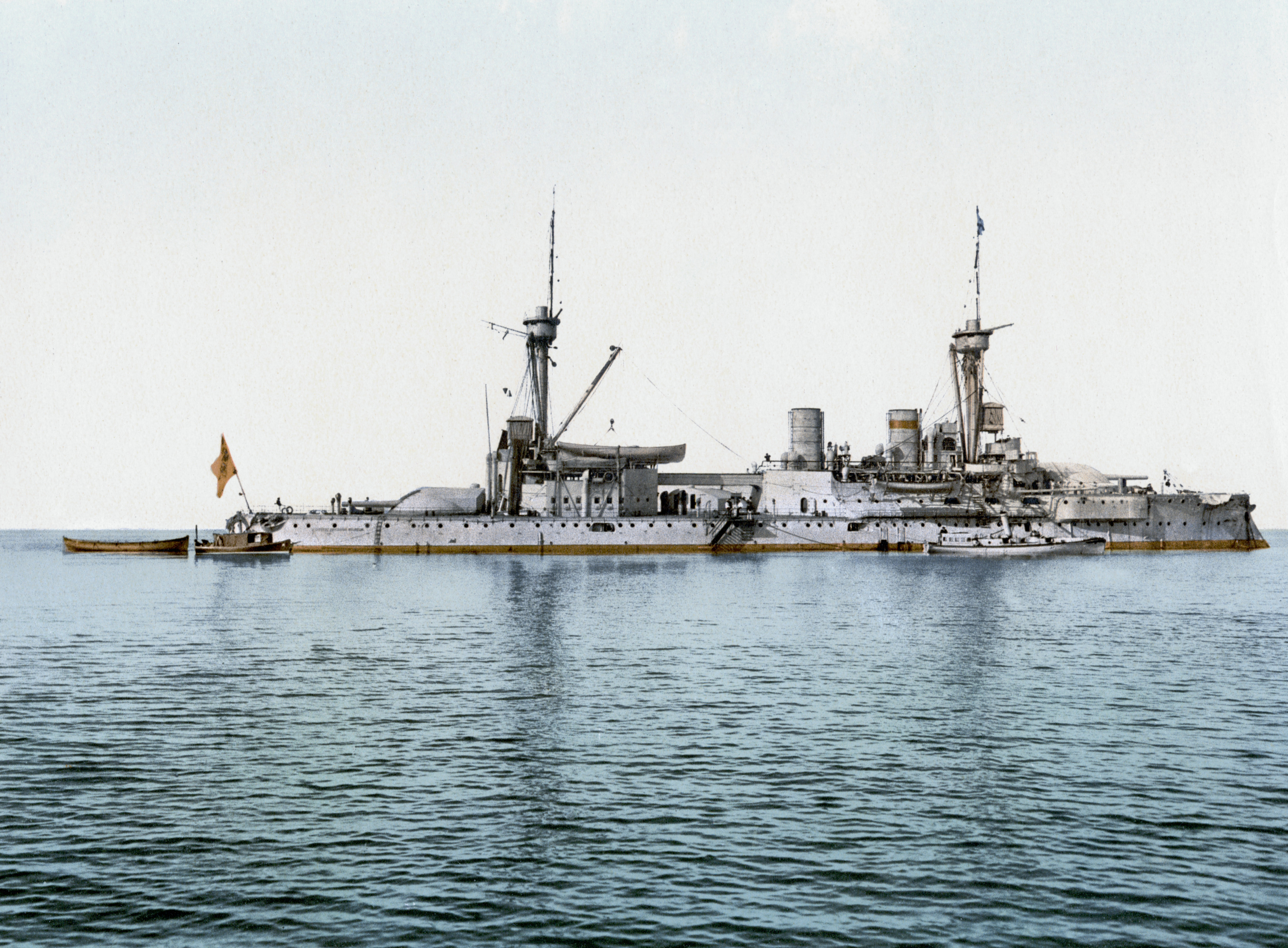
- SMS Kurfürst Friedrich Wilhelm

Class overview
- Builders: AG Vulcan Stettin (1); Friedrich Krupp Germaniawerft (1); Kaiserliche Werft Wilhelmshaven (1)
- Operators: Imperial German Navy; Ottoman Navy; Turkish Navy
- Preceded by: None
- Succeeded by: Kaiser Friedrich III class
- Built: 1890–1894
- In commission: 1893–1933
- Completed: 4
- Lost: 1
- Scrapped: 3

General characteristics
- Type: Pre-dreadnought battleship
- Displacement: Normal: 10,013 t (9,855 long tons); Full load: 10,670 t (10,500 long tons)
- Length: 115.7 m (379 ft 7 in) loa
- Beam: 19.5 m (64 ft)
- Draft: 7.6 to 7.9 m (24 ft 11 in to 25 ft 11 in)
- Installed power: 10,000 PS (9,900 ihp); 12 × Scotch marine boilers
- Propulsion: 2 × screw propellers; 2 × triple-expansion steam engines
- Speed: 16.5 knots (30.6 km/h; 19.0 mph)
- Range: 4,500 nmi (8,300 km; 5,200 mi) at 10 knots (19 km/h; 12 mph)
- Complement: 38 officers; 530 enlisted men
- Armament: 4 × 28 cm (11 in) MRK L/40 guns; 2 × 28 cm MRK L/35 guns; 6 × 10.5 cm (4.1 in) SK L/35 QF guns; 8 × 8.8 cm (3.5 in) SK L/30 QF guns; 6 × 45 cm (17.7 in) torpedo tubes
- Armor: Belt: 300 to 400 mm (11.8 to 15.7 in); Barbettes: 300 mm (11.8 in); Deck: 60 mm (2.4 in); Conning tower: 300 mm

The Brandenburg class consisted of four pre-dreadnought battleships built for the German Kaiserliche Marine (Imperial Navy), the first modern battleships of the fleet. The four ships of the class—Brandenburg, Wörth, Weissenburg, and Kurfürst Friedrich Wilhelm—were the first ocean-going capital ships built for the German fleet in nearly two decades, owing to reluctance in the Reichstag (Imperial Diet) to fund large projects. They followed a series of small coastal defense ships, and though in retrospect they anticipated the buildup that created the High Seas Fleet, they were ordered as part of a construction program that reflected the strategic and tactical confusion that affected many navies in the 1880s. The design process that resulted in the Brandenburg class was very lengthy, with proposals that ranged from outdated casemate ships to versions with two twin-gun turrets placed side by side. The designers ultimately settled on ships that were armed with an unusual main battery of six 28 cm (11 in) guns at a time when all foreign battleships were built with four or fewer heavy guns.

All four ships served with I Squadron of the German fleet for the first several years of their careers, with Kurfürst Friedrich Wilhelm the squadron flagship. During this period, they conducted routine training exercises and visited foreign countries, frequently in company with Kaiser Wilhelm II aboard his yacht. In 1900, they were deployed to China to help combat the Boxer Uprising, but they arrived after the bulk of the fighting was over and thus saw little action there. After returning to Germany they were modernized beginning in 1902, thereafter resuming their peacetime activities. Brandenburg and Wörth remained in service with the German fleet until 1912, when they were laid up. In 1910, Kurfürst Friedrich Wilhelm and Weissenburg were sold to the Ottoman Navy and were renamed Barbaros Hayreddin and Turgut Reis. The now-Ottoman ships saw extensive service during the First Balkan War, providing fire support to Ottoman ground forces fighting in Thrace, as well as engaging the Greek fleet at the Battles of Elli and Lemnos in December 1912 and January 1913, respectively.

Following the outbreak of World War I, the German ships were reactivated for use as guard ships protecting the German North Sea coast. The Ottoman vessels meanwhile were used to support the fortresses guarding the Dardanelles during the Dardanelles campaign against British and French forces. Barbaros Hayreddin was torpedoed and sunk by the British submarine HMS E11 in April 1915, though the other members of the class survived the war. Brandenburg and Wörth were disarmed and reduced to secondary duties, eventually being broken up in 1919, while Turgut Reis lingered on as a training ship until 1933. She became a barracks ship until 1950 when she was sold for scrap, and was slowly dismantled over the following decade.

== Background ==
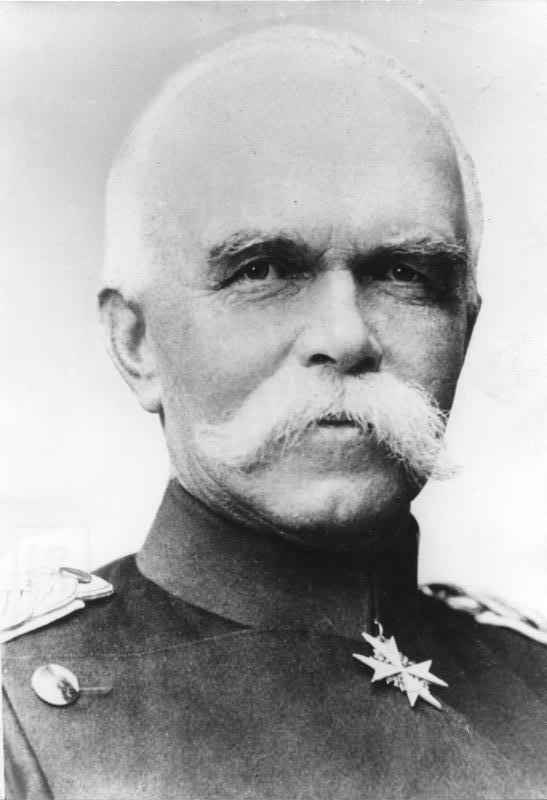
Leo von Caprivi, the Chef der Admiralität (Chief of the Admiralty) during the 1880s

In March 1883, General Leo von Caprivi became the Chef der Admiralität (Chief of the Admiralty) following Albrecht von Stosch's resignation. Caprivi was required to submit a memorandum to the Reichstag on his plans by March 1884. A general of the Imperial German Army, he was inexperienced in naval matters and he convened a council with senior naval officers on 16 January 1884 to gather opinions on future naval construction programs. At the time, he was constrained by the fleet plan of 1873 that had been created under Stosch's direction and had been approved by the Reichstag. The plan governed the size and composition of the German fleet, calling for fourteen ocean-going ironclad warships, a total that was reached with the launching of the casemate ship Oldenburg in 1884. The nominal completion of the 1873 plan further restrained Caprivi, as in the view of many members of the Reichstag, naval budgets could be reduced, since no new ships would be needed until the oldest ironclads began to reach thirty years of age in the mid-1890s. At the January council meeting, Caprivi emphasized the need for careful consideration of new designs, noting that the navy could not afford "the luxury of failed experiments", owing to parliamentary refusal to authorize funding for new ships.

Concerns with a two-front war against France and Russia dominated Caprivi's thinking, which resulted in his decision to opt for a strategy of coastal defense in the memorandum; he noted that without a powerful battle fleet, the sea-going ironclads would have little utility against the numerically superior French fleet. He also pointed out that at the time, shell designers and armor manufacturers were competing to defeat each other, which necessitated spiraling costs for navies that attempted to keep pace with the latest technological developments. He also saw that the torpedo could be used to easily sink large armored warships and would be an effective weapon for coastal defense. As a result of these considerations, Caprivi recommended building a large number of smaller coastal defense ships and torpedo boats to defend Germany's coastline in the event of war. Aware of parliamentary objections to increased naval spending, he avoided plans for the construction of expensive battleships. Coincidentally, the French Navy, then at the height of the dominance of the Jeune École (Young School), came to the same conclusions with respect to their competition with the British Royal Navy. Indeed, the 1870s and 1880s marked a period of tactical and strategic confusion in naval thinking in the world's major navies for the same reasons that Caprivi had highlighted in his memorandum.

Despite the memorandum submitted to the Reichstag that eschewed capital ship construction, Caprivi secretly discussed new ironclads at length with senior naval officers. He instructed Konteradmiral (KAdm—Rear Admiral) Max von der Goltz, then the Director of the Admiralty's Naval Department, to prepare a list of thirteen questions concerning the characteristics of a new capital ship and then to circulate them among naval officers to gather views on the topic. The questions included requirements for speed, cruising radius, maximum draft, whether sailing rigs should be included, the number, type, and arrangement of main battery guns, and the armor type and layout. Goltz met with several other officers, including Hans von Koester, August von Thomsen, Hans Sack, Wilhelm Büchsel, Carl Barandon, Conrad von Bodenhausen, Gustav Schmidt, and Curt von Maltzahn on 20 October 1885 to discuss the questions. They settled on a ship armed with four 30.5 cm (12 in) guns arranged in the lozenge pattern favored by contemporary French capital ship designers, a thick armored belt and armored deck, and an ability to steam for 5,000 nautical miles (9,300 km; 5,800 mi). Other questions, including the speed and crew size, were left unanswered.

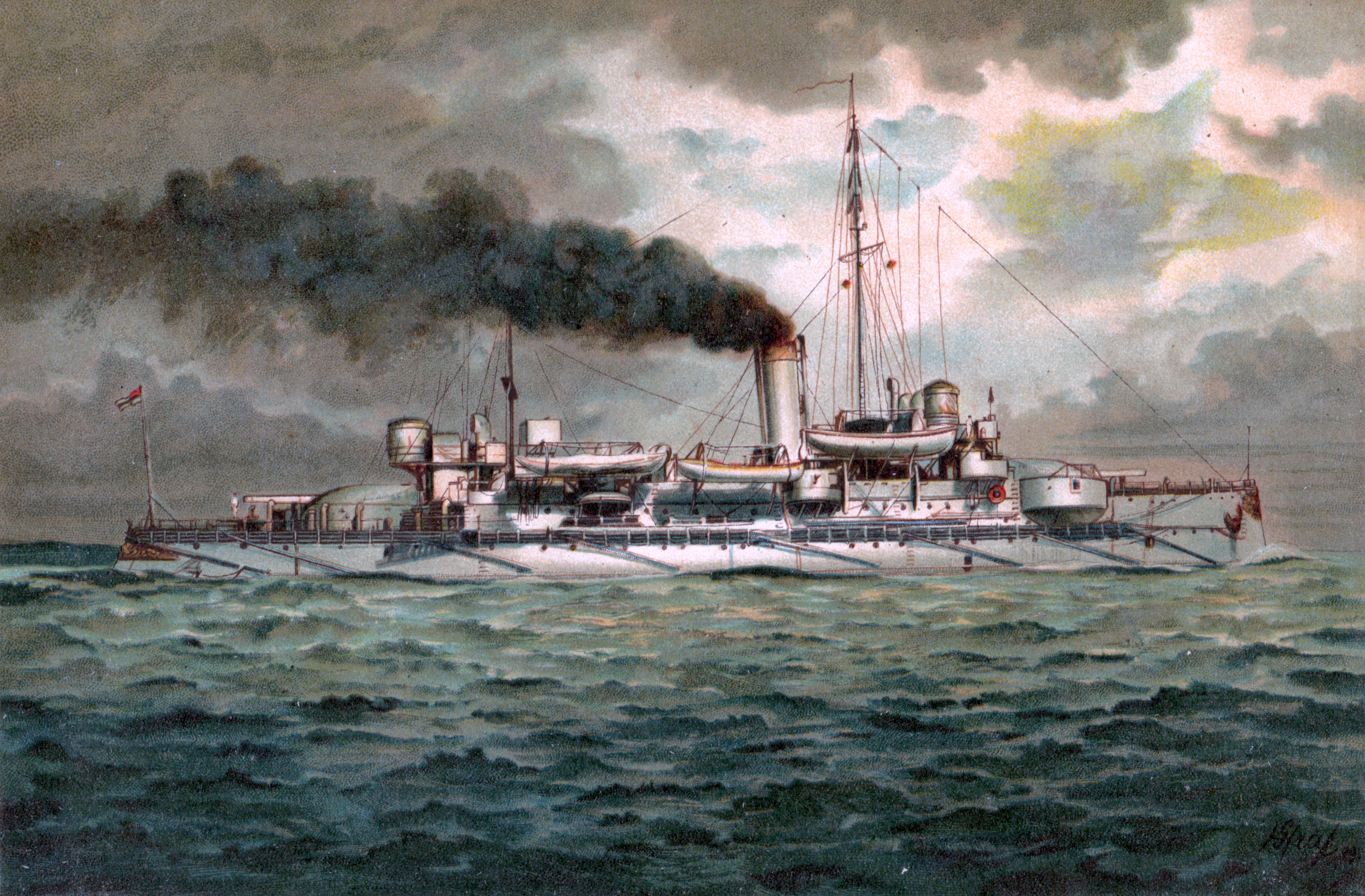
A lithograph of the Siegfried-class coastal defense ship SMS Heimdall

At the same time, Caprivi requested design proposals from the Naval Construction Office, which submitted plans for ships that ranged in size from small 2,500 t (2,500-long-ton) coastal defense ships armed with a battery of two 21 cm (8.3 in) guns to heavily armed 10,000 t (9,800-long-ton) ocean-going battleships equipped with seven 30.5 cm guns. The Reichstag still refused to authorize expensive new ships, especially in light of the cost of creating the Kaiser Wilhelm Canal, though Caprivi was able to convince enough members that the entrances of the canal would be vulnerable to attack and that coastal defense ships would be necessary to guard them. The Reichstag accordingly approved funds for ten such vessels, which ultimately became the six Siegfried- and two Odin-class coastal defense ships; the last two vessels were later cancelled in 1893. The first ship, SMS Siegfried, was authorized for the 1887–1888 budget year. In early 1887, Kapitän zur See (Captain at Sea) Friedrich von Hollmann, who was now Caprivi's chief of staff, presented plans for the 1889–1890 budget year that included the construction of one of the sea-going battleships requested by Goltz's committee, with a second vessel scheduled for the 1892–1893 year. Caprivi replied that funding would have to be approved by the Reichstag, and that there was still testing necessary to determine what type of armor they should carry.

In 1888, Kaiser Wilhelm I died and his successor, the terminally ill Kaiser Friedrich III, remained on the throne for just 99 days before dying as well. The new Kaiser, Wilhelm II, was an ardent supporter of the navy, which was to have profound impacts on the future of the service. Shortly thereafter, Caprivi resigned and was replaced by Vizeadmiral (Vice Admiral) Alexander von Monts in July; in March 1889, Wilhelm II reorganized the naval command structure, creating the Reichsmarineamt (RMA), which was now in control of naval construction. The navy initially requested a pair of battleships in line with Hollmann's projected budget, but Wilhelm II intervened to demand four new ships for the 1889–1890 budget. German Chancellor Otto von Bismarck secured funding for the ships through the larger army expansion bill, though the Reichstag delayed funding for the latter three members of the class.

== Design ==
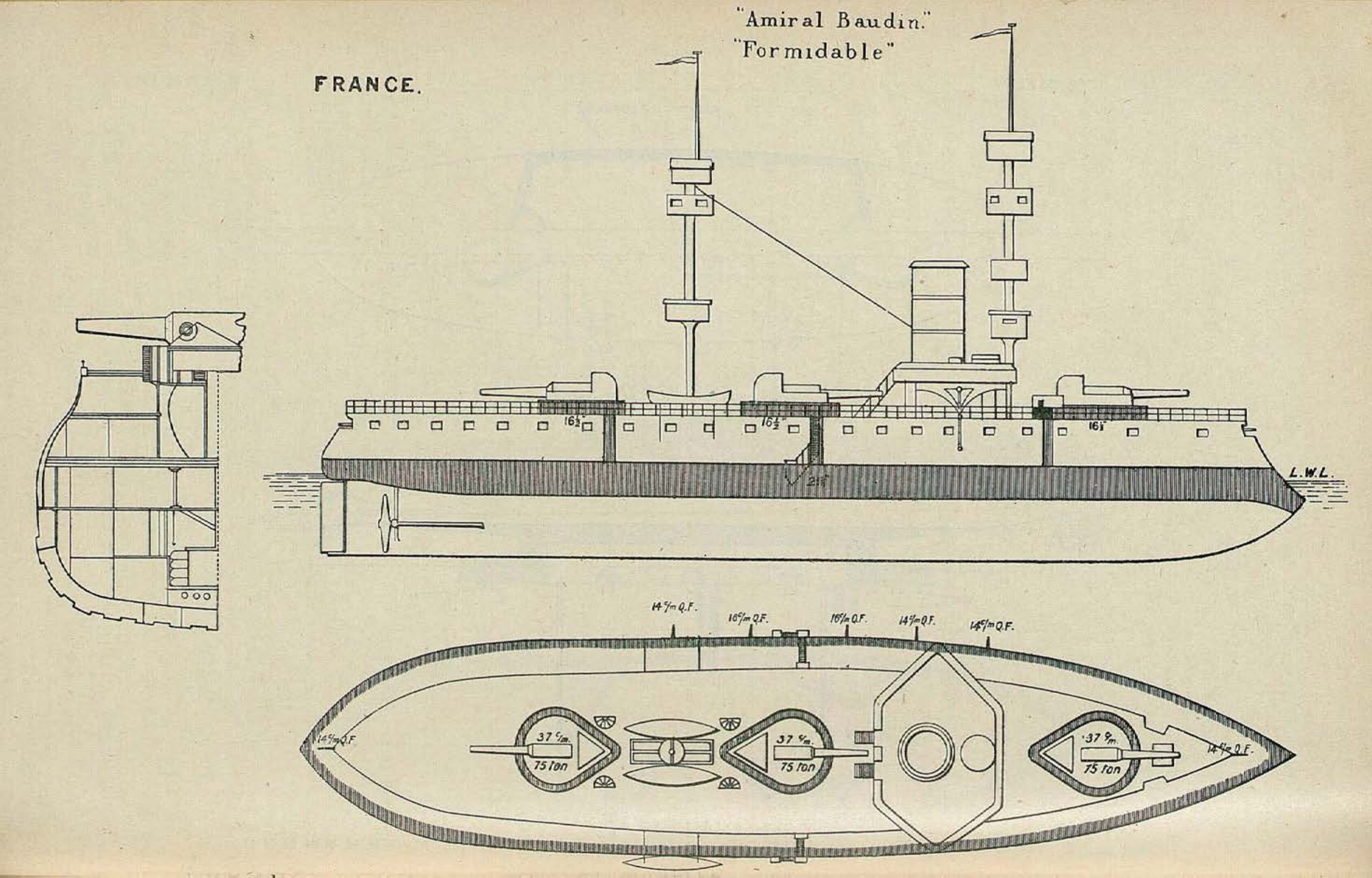
The French Amiral Baudin class, which heavily influenced the Brandenburg design

The design for what was to become the Brandenburg class was prepared by Chief Constructor Alfred Dietrich; he originally used Oldenburg as a starting point. In his first memorandum on the project, he noted that the Oldenburg design would have to be enlarged to provide room for more powerful propulsion machinery and increased coal storage, and armor would have to be strengthened, among other changes. Displacement was originally fixed at 8,500 t (8,400 long tons). In a subsequent memorandum dated 8 August 1888, Dietrich raised the possibility of increasing the caliber of the main battery from 24 cm (9.4 in) to 26 cm (10 in). Dietrich met with Monts on 15 August, who requested that the new ship be armed with four 28 cm (11 in) guns, since the 26 cm guns were perceived to be too small to effectively engage the latest Russian ships being built. This version was submitted two days later to Wilhelm II, who approved it.

Dietrich initially considered the latest Russian battleships being built—the Ekaterina II and the Imperator Aleksandr II classes—which arranged their main battery to emphasize end-on fire. He briefly examined the possibility of mounting two gun turrets forward, similar to the Ekaterina II design, but the beam necessary to accommodate guns of that size along with the hull armor would have made the ship too large to be docked in most German dry docks. Variants with four to six single-gun turrets were also prepared, as was a version with two twin turrets and two single-gun wing turrets. By this time, the displacement limit had been raised to 10,000 t (9,800 long tons), though the RMA agreed to allow an increase to 11,400 t (11,200 long tons), as that was the maximum displacement that could be accommodated by existing infrastructure.

As Dietrich continued to work on the plans, he examined other foreign contemporaries, including the French Amiral Baudin-class ironclad battleships that carried three main battery guns in individual barbette mounts, all on the centerline. He proposed an armament of six heavy guns in three two-gun turrets in the same arrangement. While this would reduce the end-on fire capability, the RMA determined that the heavier broadside outweighed the reduction in firing arcs ahead or astern. The ships were to have carried a uniform battery of six 28 cm MRK L/35 guns, (Note: In Imperial German Navy gun nomenclature, "MRK" stands for Marine Ring Kanone, meaning that it was a naval gun of built-up construction, while the L/35 denotes the length of the gun. In this case, the L/35 gun is 35 caliber, meaning that the gun barrel is 35 times as long as it is in diameter.) but during construction a longer 40-caliber version, the MRK L/40 variant, became available. The fore and aft turrets received the longer guns, but the center turret did not have enough space to fit them owing to the closeness of the aft superstructure, so the shorter guns were retained.

The Brandenburgs were the first ocean-going capital ships to be built for the German fleet in almost twenty years. Their construction caused significant concern in Russia, which was a possible naval opponent in the Baltic Sea; the Russians decided to strengthen their Baltic Fleet with as many as ten new battleships, though funding proved to be insufficient and the program was significantly pared down. The Brandenburg class was significantly smaller and less powerful than the contemporary British Royal Sovereign class, but roughly equal with the series of French battleships begun with Charles Martel and with the Russian Navarin (the French ships being faster but much less heavily armed and the Russian ship being slower but armed with heavier main guns). Though they were the first modern battleships built in Germany, presaging the Tirpitz-era High Seas Fleet, the authorization for the ships came as part of a construction program that reflected the strategic and tactical confusion of the 1880s caused by theories like the Jeune École.

=== General characteristics ===
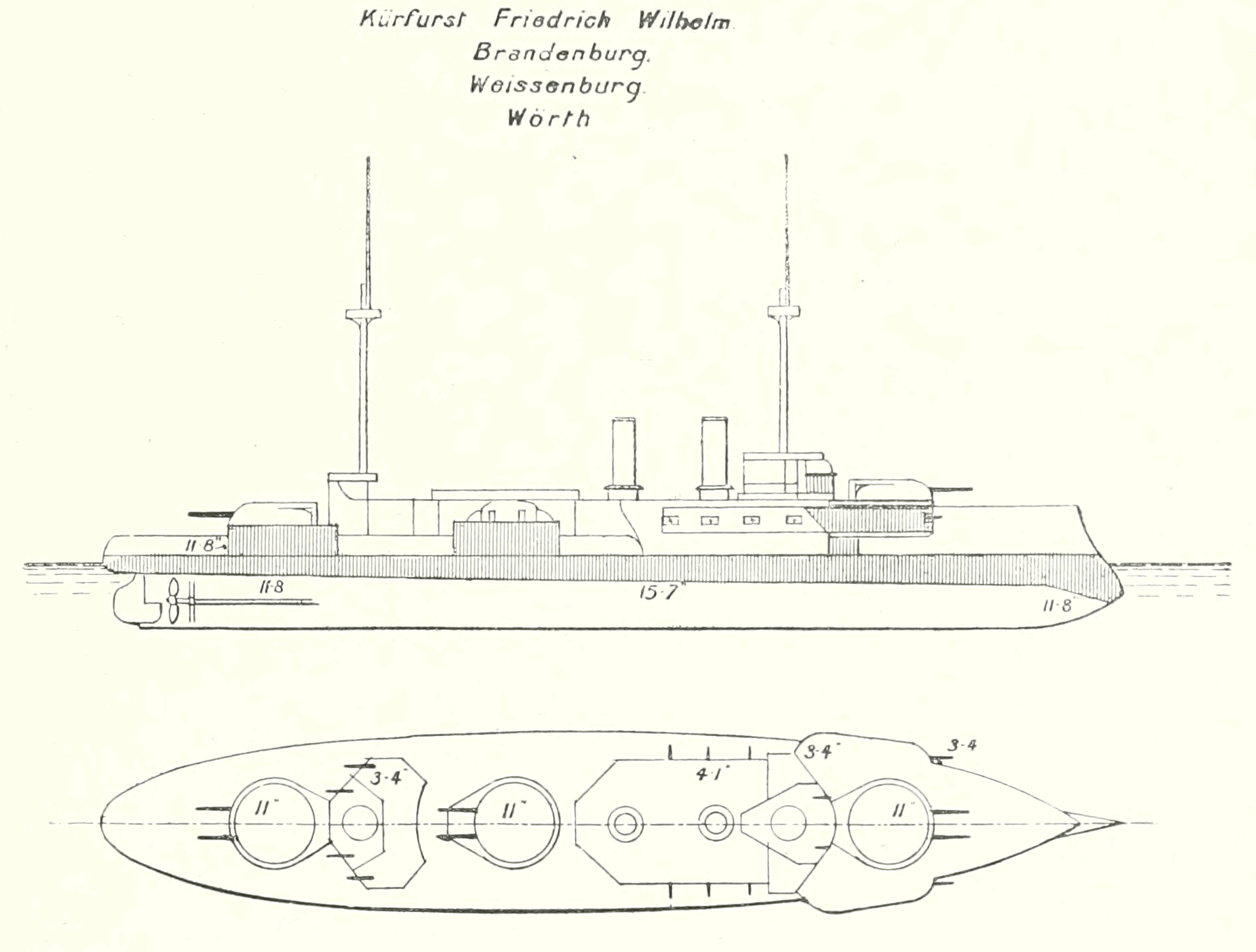
Right elevation and plan of the Brandenburg class as depicted in The Naval Annual 1902

The ships of the Brandenburg class were 108 m (354 ft 4 in) long between perpendiculars, 113.9 m (373 ft 8 in) long at the waterline, and 115.7 m (379 ft 7 in) long overall. They had a beam of 19.5 m (64 ft) which was increased to 19.74 m (64 ft 9 in) with the addition of torpedo nets, and had a draft of 7.6 m (24 ft 11 in) forward and 7.9 m (25 ft 11 in) aft. The Brandenburgs displaced 10,013 t (9,855 long tons) at their designed weight, and up to 10,670 t (10,500 long tons) at full load. As was the standard for German warships of the period, the hulls of the Brandenburg-class ships were constructed from both transverse and longitudinal steel frames, over which the steel side plates were riveted. The vessels had thirteen watertight compartments and a double bottom that ran for 48% of the length of the hull. Their hulls featured a tumblehome shape above the main deck, and as was common for warships of the era, a ram bow. The ships had a raised forecastle deck that extended to the aft funnel, thereafter reducing to the main deck level.

The German navy regarded the ships as excellent sea-boats and the Brandenburgs had easy motion. They were also responsive to commands from the bridge and had a moderate turning circle. Despite their generally positive handling characteristics, the ships were "wet" at high speeds despite the forecastle deck and suffered from severe pitching. The ships lost up to 30% of their speed at hard rudder. Their metacentric height was 1.05 m (3 ft 5 in), and their maximum stability moment was 31.5 degrees.

The ships' crew numbered 38 officers and 530 enlisted men, though while serving as the squadron flagship the standard crew was augmented by an additional 9 officers and 54 men. After their refits, their standard crew consisted of 30 officers and 561 enlisted sailors, with an additional 9 officers and 48 enlisted men as flagships. They carried a number of small boats, including a pair of picket boats, two launches, one pinnace, two cutters, two yawls, and two dinghies.

=== Machinery ===
The ships' propulsion system consisted of two 3-cylinder triple-expansion engines with steam provided by twelve coal-fired, transverse Scotch marine boilers. The engines each had their own engine rooms and drove two 3-bladed screw propellers that were 5 m (16 ft) in diameter. The boilers were also split into two boiler rooms and they were ducted into a pair of funnels. Electrical power was provided by three generators. The equipment varied from ship to ship; power output ranged from 72.6 to 96.5 kilowatts at 67 volts. The ships each had a single rudder.

The engines were rated at 10,000 metric horsepower (9,900 ihp) for a top speed of 16.5 knots (30.6 km/h; 19.0 mph), though in service the ships varied in both power and speed. Kurfürst Friedrich Wilhelm, the vessel with the lowest power, 9,686 PS (9,553 ihp), nevertheless reached 16.9 knots (31.3 km/h; 19.4 mph), the same speed as Wörth, the vessel with the highest power output, 10,228 PS (10,088 ihp). Brandenburg was the slowest member of the class, falling short of the designed speed at 16.3 knots (30.2 km/h; 18.8 mph). Coal storage amounted to 650 t (640 long tons) under peacetime conditions, but additional hull spaces could be used to increase capacity to 1,050 t (1,030 long tons) in time of war. The ships had a cruising radius of 4,500 nautical miles (8,300 km; 5,200 mi) at a cruising speed of 10 knots (19 km/h; 12 mph).

=== Armament ===
Weissenburg; note the closeness of the center turret to the superstructure, which necessitated the shorter guns and limited the firing arc

==== Main battery ====
The Brandenburg-class battleships carried a battery of six 28 cm guns of two different calibers; the forward and aft turrets mounted 40-caliber guns while the amidships turret required the use of shorter 35-caliber guns to allow the turret to rotate. The turrets consisted of a rotating platform that held the guns, protected by an armored barbette on all sides. An armored hood with curved sides above the barbette protected the guns and crews, but the curved shape of the front of the hood necessitated large openings through which to raise and depress the guns, which proved to be a liability since enemy shells could enter through them, as happened to Barbaros Hayreddin (ex-Kurfürst Friedrich Wilhelm) in 1913.

The 35-caliber guns had a muzzle velocity of 685 m/s (2,250 ft/s), while the longer guns had a velocity of 715 m/s (2,350 ft/s); the differing velocities produced different ballistics, but the designers were not concerned with the problem, owing to the short ranges at which the ships were expected to fight and the primitive state of fire control in the 1880s. Propellant charges consisted of brown powder. Both types of guns used the same C/92 barbette mount that allowed for depression to −4 degrees and elevation to 25 degrees. The 35-caliber guns had a maximum range of 11,450 m (37,570 ft), while the higher velocity of the longer guns increased their range to 15,090 m (49,510 ft).

The turrets were hydraulically operated and required the rotating gun houses to return to the centerline to reload the guns. In their original configuration, the guns had a rate of fire of one shot every three minutes, but after their refits in the early 1900s, the ships' loading equipment was modernized to improve the rate to one shot per minute. Ammunition magazines stored a total of 352 shells; these were 240 kg (530 lb) projectiles that had a 56.6 kg (125 lb) bursting charge.

==== Secondary and tertiary guns ====
The Brandenburg class's secondary armament initially consisted of six 10.5 cm (4.1 in) SK L/35 quick-firing guns in individual casemates arranged in an armored battery below the forward superstructure. These guns had recently been adapted by Krupp from existing guns to employ quick-firing technology. The guns were in C/91 pivot mounts that allowed elevation to 30.3 degrees, for a maximum range of 10,800 m (35,400 ft). Their rate of fire was theoretically 10 rounds per minute, but in practice it was limited to 7.5 shots per minute. Muzzle velocity was 600 m/s (2,000 ft/s), though with the C/07 shells introduced in 1907, this increased to 620 m/s (2,000 ft/s). During their modernization, another pair of guns was added and ammunition storage increased from 600 rounds to 1,184 shells, which were a mixture of armor piercing and high explosive (HE) rounds.

For close-range defense against torpedo boats, the ships also carried eight 8.8 cm (3.5 in) SK L/30 quick-firing guns. These were also mounted in casemates, four in sponsons abreast the forward main battery turret and four in the rear superstructure. They were carried in C/89 mounts with an elevation range of −10 to 20 degrees; at maximum elevation, the guns could reach targets at 7,300 m (24,000 ft). Muzzle velocity was 590 m/s (1,900 ft/s). These guns were supplied with a total of 2,000 shells, though as with the 10.5 cm guns, ammunition storage was increased during the modernization, to 2,384 rounds. These were originally all C/83 common shells, though they were replaced by C/01 semi-armor-piercing (SAP) shells in 1901, and C/07 shells in 1907, which came in HE and SAP varieties. Rate of fire was theoretically fourteen shots per minute, but in practice it was limited to ten rounds per minute.

==== Torpedo tubes ====
In the 1880s, naval tacticians assumed most battles would devolve into a close-range melee, where torpedoes would become the decisive weapon, since they could damage a heavily armored ship below the waterline where the belt armor did not protect it. While the ships were under construction, Hollmann argued in a February 1891 memorandum that the original torpedo armament was not sufficient. He suggested that two torpedo tubes should be installed in the bow below the waterline to increase the forward firepower in the expected melee. There was no room in the bow to fit two torpedo tubes, however, so they were fitted in above-water mounts. At the same time, many foreign navies were adopting larger torpedoes, including the Royal Navy, which had shifted from its standard 35.6 cm (14 in) torpedo to a 45 cm (17.7 in) version. The Germans followed suit; the older 35 cm (14 in) C/84 torpedo was replaced with a much more powerful 45 cm C/91 version.

The ships received six 45 cm torpedo tubes, four of which were mounted on the sides of the ship in above-water swivel mounts. The other two were in the bow, also above the waterline. The tubes were supplied with a total of 16 torpedoes, which carried a 87.5 kg (193 lb) warhead. They had a top speed of 32 knots (59 km/h; 37 mph) compared to the 24-knot (44 km/h; 28 mph) speed of the C/84 torpedoes; this allowed the torpedoes to travel 400 m (1,300 ft) in 24 seconds instead of the 30 seconds it would have taken the older torpedoes, making aiming at moving targets significantly easier. Their maximum range at 32 knots was 500 m (1,600 ft); when set to 26 knots (48 km/h; 30 mph), their range increased to 800 m (2,600 ft).

=== Armor ===
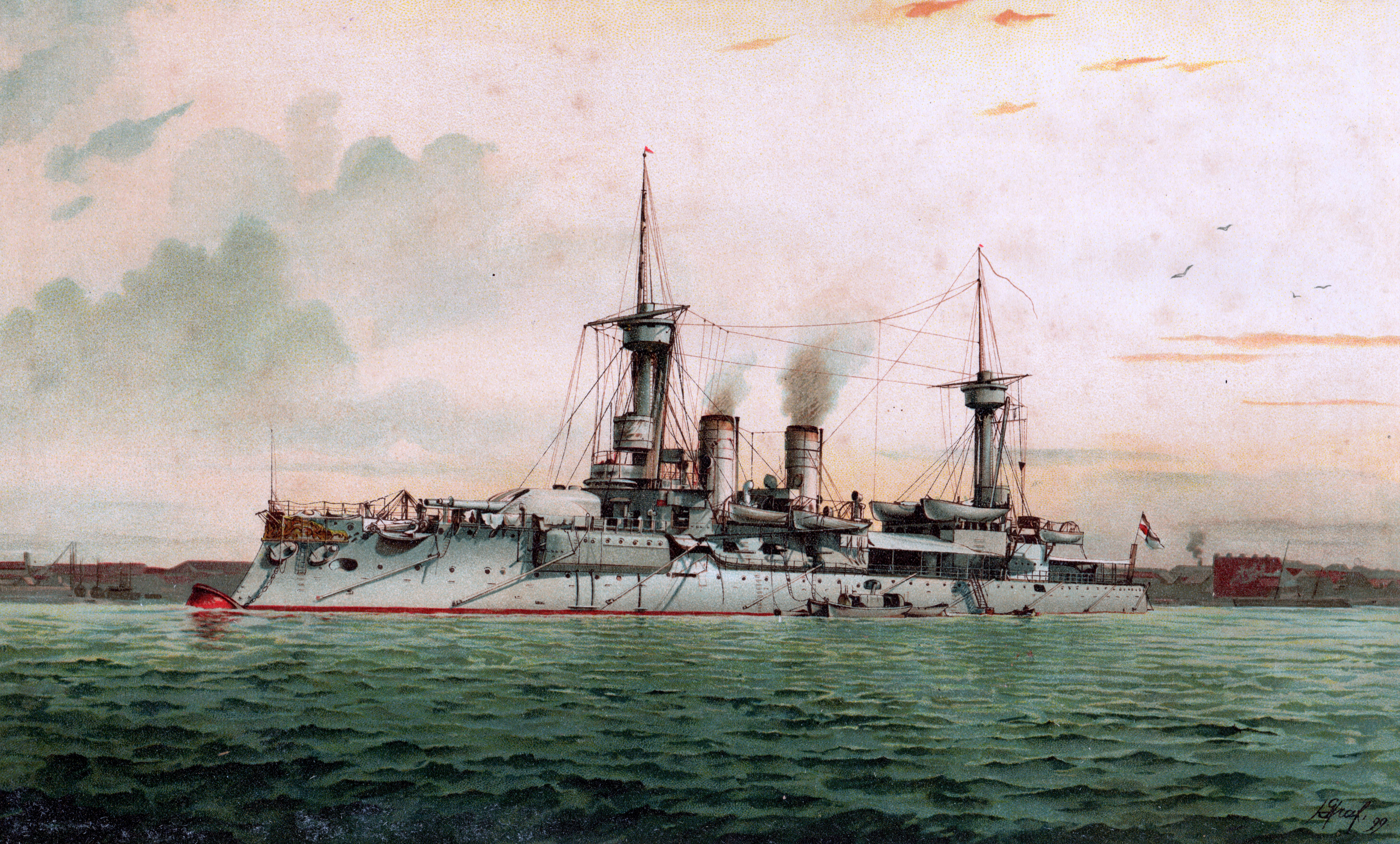
Lithograph of Weissenburg

The first two ships, Brandenburg and Wörth, received compound armor, then the standard type of steel armor, manufactured by Dillinger Hütte, but at the time, Krupp was experimenting with a new nickel-steel armor that was ordered for Weissenburg and Kurfürst Friedrich Wilhelm. The compound armor was constructed by welding hardened steel together with more flexible wrought iron plates to take advantage of the hardness of steel and the greater flexibility of wrought iron to break up and then contain incoming shells. Krupp's nickel steel armor was based on the Harvey process, which enriched the upper layers of the steel with carbon. The process hardened the outer layer while retaining greater flexibility at the back of the plate; the fact that the new armor plate consisted of a single forging instead of multiple plates welded together gave it greater strength. This allowed the use of thinner (and thus lighter) armor belts that provided the same level of protection, which in turn permitted more comprehensive protection for the same weight of armor. Some portions of Brandenburg did receive the new Krupp armor, including the barbettes that held the fore and center main battery turrets. All four ships retained teak backing to their armor belts. The teak was used to help absorb the shock of a torpedo or naval mine detonation.

The side protection system followed the so-called "French principle", using a narrow, full-length armored belt to protect the hull, rather than a shorter citadel system that only protected a ship's ammunition magazines and propulsion machinery spaces. The belt extended from 0.8 m (2 ft 7 in) above the waterline to 1.6 m (5 ft 3 in) below, though toward the bow it was extended further down to reinforce the ram. Above the waterline, the armored belt was 300 mm (11.8 in) forward and as the belt moved further aft, it stepped up to 330 mm (13 in), then to 380 mm (15 in), and finally to 400 mm (15.7 in) in the central portion of the ship where it protected the magazines and machinery spaces. Further aft, it tapered to 350 mm (13.8 in) and then to 300 mm toward the stern. Below the waterline, the armored belt was significantly thinner; like the upper belt, it tapered toward the ends. It started at 150 mm (5.9 in) at the bow, increasing to 180 mm (7.1 in), then to 190 mm (7.5 in), and then to 200 mm (7.9 in) thick amidships, and tapered down to 180 mm (7.1 in) on the aft end of the belt. The teak backing for the belt amounted to 200 mm, and the whole assembly was bolted together.

The Brandenburgs had an armored deck 60 mm (2.4 in) thick that was connected to the upper edge of the belt; it was effective only at deflecting short-range shells and could not have resisted plunging fire or a shell that detonated on impact. The forward conning tower had 300 mm sides and a 30 mm (1.2 in) roof. The barbettes for the main battery turrets were 300 mm thick and backed with 210 mm (8.3 in) of teak. The gun houses for the main battery had 50 mm (2 in) roofs and sides that consisted of three 40 mm (1.6 in) layers, for a total of 120 mm (4.7 in). The 10.5 cm and 8.8 cm guns received gun shields that consisted of two plates of steel bolted together; each shield consisted of a 20 mm (0.79 in) plate and a 22 mm (0.87 in) plate.

=== Modifications ===
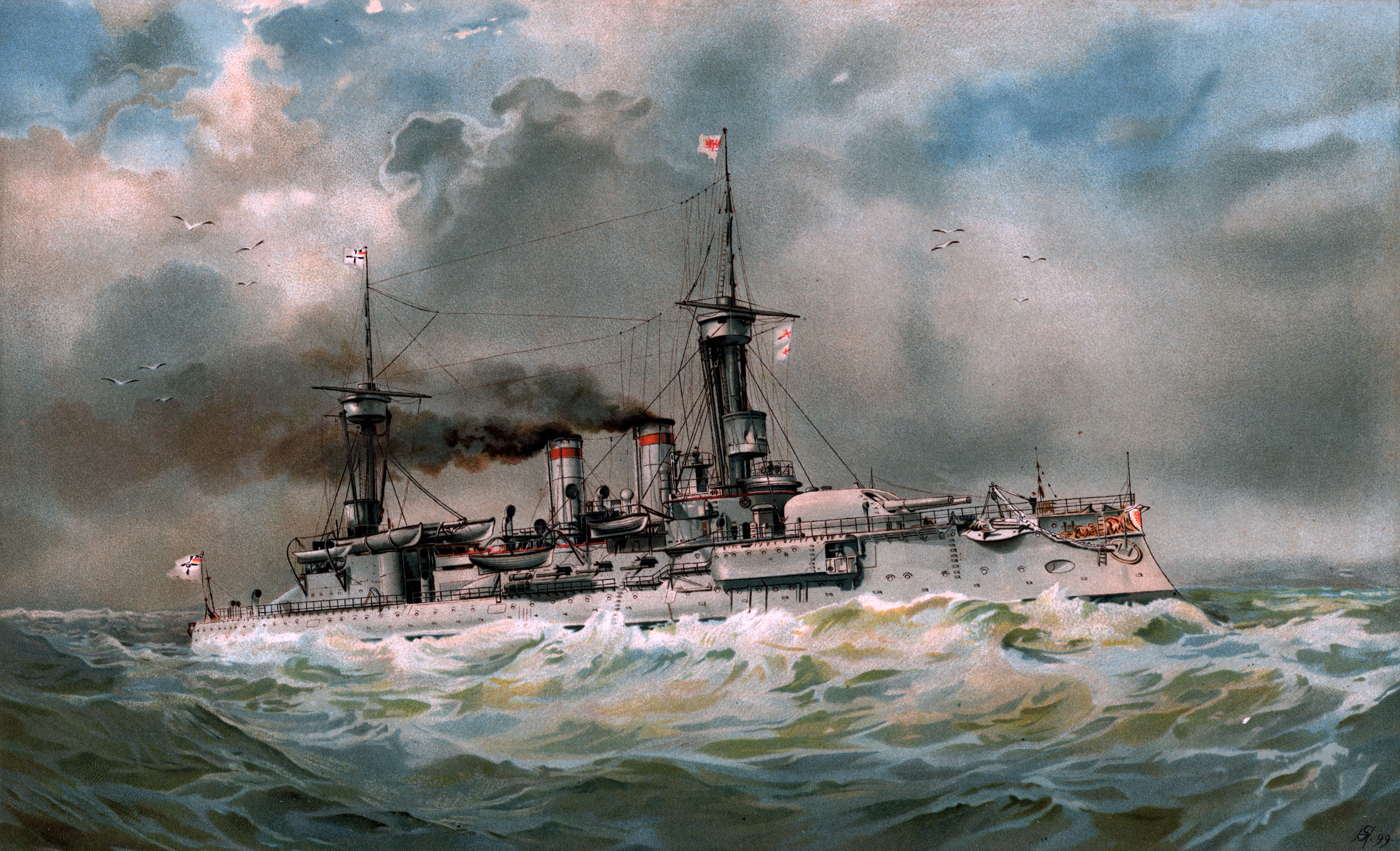
A 1902 lithograph of Brandenburg

Over the course of their careers, the ships underwent a series of modifications. After entering service in 1894–1895, the vessels had their funnels increased in height by 1.5 to 3 m (4 ft 11 in to 9 ft 10 in) to reduce smoke interference with the mainmast spotting top. Beginning in 1896, the German navy began to acquire 3.7 cm (1.5 in) Maxim guns to supplement the 8.8 cm guns in anti-torpedo-boat defense. Though these were very light weapons, firing a 0.66 kg (1.5 lb) projectile, the Germans believed that a hail of fire would prevent torpedo boat crews from approaching close enough to launch their torpedoes. The guns had a maximum rate of fire of 100 rounds per minute, but using deliberate fire the rate was 33 shots per minute. Four of these guns were installed in the fighting tops of the ships' masts. Before their deployment to East Asia in 1900, all four ships received wireless telegraphy sets, making them the first ships of the German fleet to carry radio sets.

Between 1902 and 1904, the four ships were extensively modified. During the modernization, a second, armored conning tower was added in the aft superstructure, along with a gangway. The new tower had sides 120 mm (4.7 in) thick and a 20 mm (0.79 in) roof. The work included increasing the ship's coal storage capacity and adding another pair of 10.5 cm guns. The plans had initially called for the center 28 cm turret to be replaced with an armored battery of medium-caliber guns, but this proved to be prohibitively expensive. The ships' torpedo armament was significantly reduced; two of the broadside tubes were removed, as were both bow tubes, while one above-water tube was installed in the stern in a trainable mounting. Total torpedo storage amounted to five torpedoes. Their masts had their searchlight platforms removed. The refit reduced the ships' displacement by 500 to 700 t (490 to 690 long tons).

Later in her career, Wörth received two searchlights mounted on the roof of the fighting top of her foremast, along with a third on the roof of her aft bridge. An enclosed spotting top was installed in 1915. Both she and Brandenburg were disarmed in 1916 after they were removed from active service.

== Construction ==
Lithograph of Kurfürst Friedrich Wilhelm, 1899

Construction data
Ship	Contract name	Builder	Laid down	Launched	Completed
Brandenburg	Armored Ship A	AG Vulcan, Stettin	May 1890	21 September 1891	19 November 1893
Wörth	Armored Ship B	Germaniawerft, Kiel	3 March 1890	6 August 1892	31 October 1893
Weissenburg	Armored Ship C	AG Vulcan, Stettin	May 1890	14 December 1891	14 October 1894
Kurfürst Friedrich Wilhelm	Armored Ship D	Kaiserliche Werft Wilhelmshaven	March 1890	30 June 1891	29 April 1894

As the members of the class entered service in late 1893, they conducted sea trials that lasted into 1894. Kurfürst Friedrich Wilhelm's tests revealed problems with her propulsion machinery that required lengthy repairs for much of 1894. Brandenburg suffered a boiler explosion during sea trials on 16 February 1894 that killed forty-four men: twenty-five crew members, eighteen shipyard workers, and one from the commission evaluating the trials. The accident had been caused by an incorrectly manufactured valve in the starboard engine. The four ships were among the last German vessels to undergo builder's trials before formal acceptance by the Kaiserliche Marine; after Wörth, most German capital ships underwent testing after commissioning.

== Service history ==
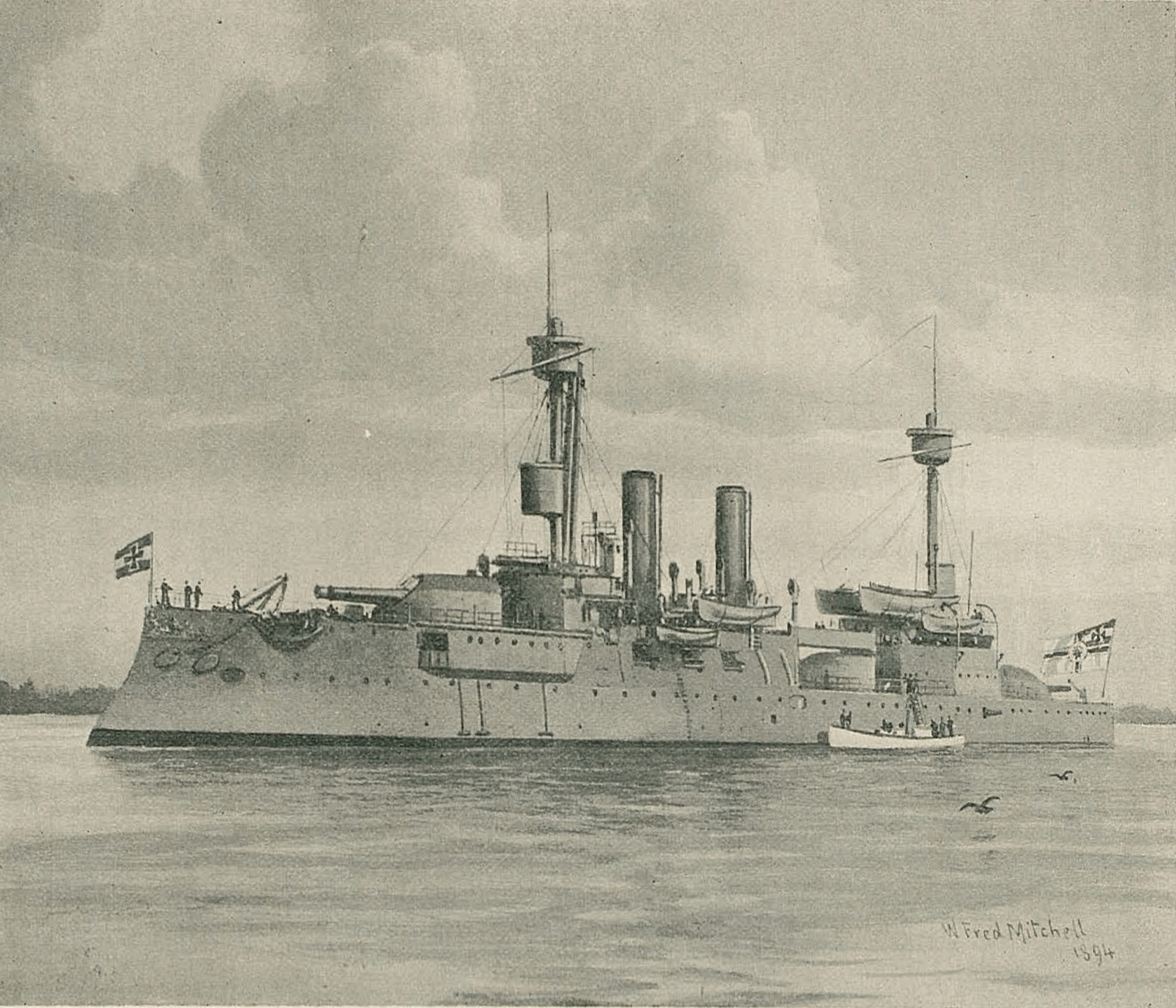
Illustration of Brandenburg by William Frederick Mitchell, c. 1894

=== Early career ===
As the members of the class entered service beginning in 1894, they were assigned to I Division of I Squadron, and Kurfürst Friedrich Wilhelm became the squadron flagship. Throughout the rest of the 1890s, the ships conducted routine training exercises, visits to foreign countries, and training cruises. Maneuvers included tactical training, shooting practice, and joint operations with Imperial German Army units to practice coastal defense. The ships were involved in a number of accidents: Brandenburg collided with the aviso Jagd in August 1896 and in November 1899, Wörth struck a submerged rock and was badly damaged. As the largest warships of the German fleet, they frequently escorted Wilhelm II's yacht Hohenzollern on state visits or to sailing regattas, most notably Cowes Week in Britain.

During the Boxer Uprising in 1900, Chinese nationalists laid siege to the foreign embassies in Beijing and murdered Baron Clemens von Ketteler, the German minister. The widespread violence against westerners in China led to an alliance between Germany and seven other Great Powers: the United Kingdom, Italy, Russia, Austria-Hungary, the United States, France, and Japan. The allied forces in the country were insufficient to defeat the Boxers, so the Kaiser ordered an expeditionary force, which consisted of the four Brandenburgs, six cruisers, 10 freighters, three torpedo boats, and six regiments of marines, under the command of Generalfeldmarschall (Field Marshal) Alfred von Waldersee, to deploy to China. By the time the German fleet had arrived in late August 1900, the siege of Beijing had already been lifted by forces from other members of the Eight-Nation Alliance that had formed to deal with the Boxers. As a result, the task force suppressed local uprisings around Jiaozhou Bay, where Germany maintained the Jiaozhou Bay Leased Territory. In the end, the operation cost the German government more than 100 million marks. On 26 May 1901, the German high command recalled the expeditionary force to Germany, arriving in mid-August.

After returning from China, the ships resumed their typical peacetime routine. By this time, the Kaiser Friedrich III and Wittelsbach classes of battleships had begun to enter service, so the four Brandenburgs were decommissioned to be modernized. By late 1907, all four members of the class were reduced to the Reserve Squadron, with Kurfürst Friedrich Wilhelm again serving as the flagship. The ships operated together there for the following three years before Kurfürst Friedrich Wilhelm and Weissenburg were sold to the Ottoman Empire in September 1910.

=== Brandenburg and Wörth ===
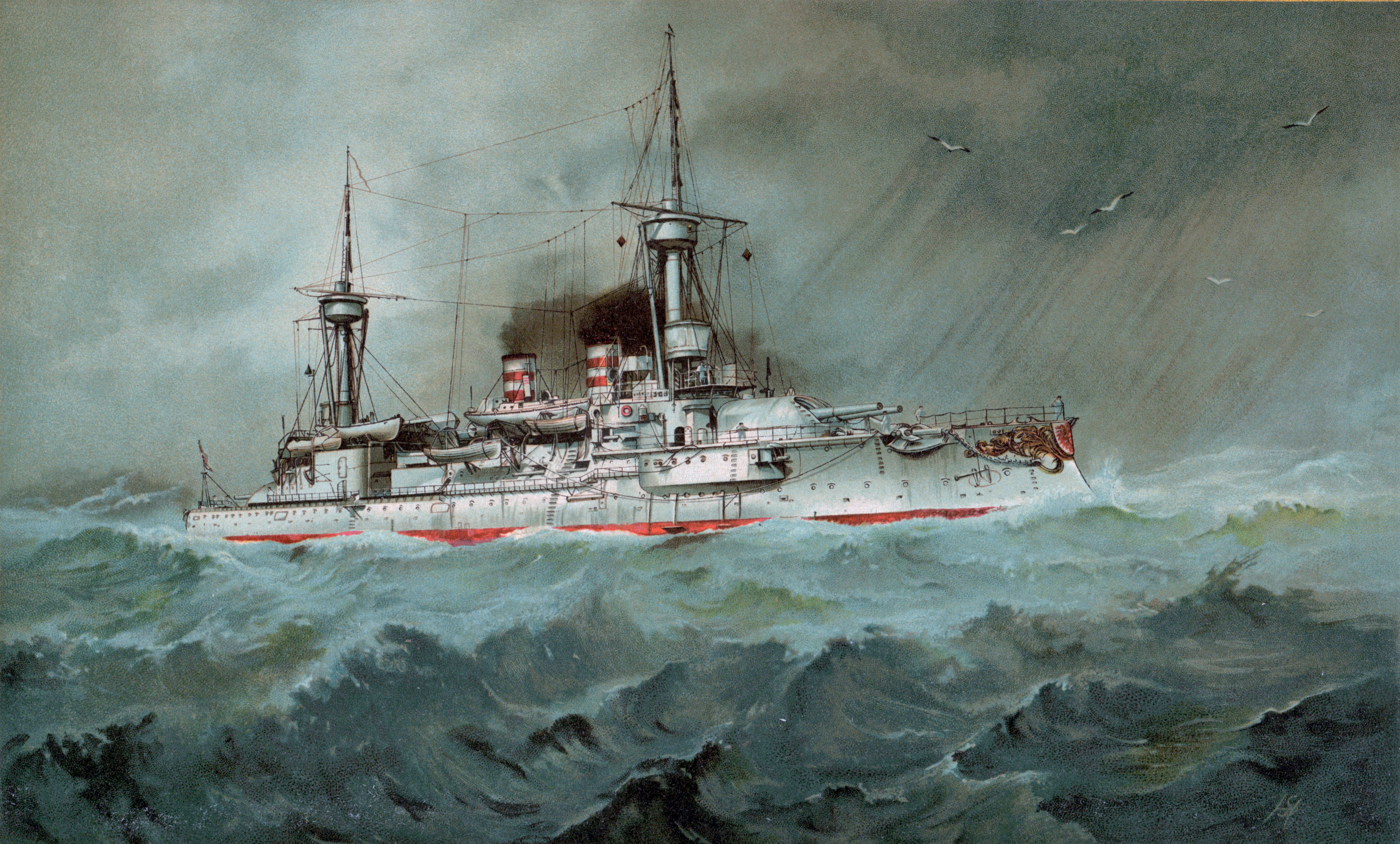
A 1902 lithograph of Wörth

Brandenburg and Wörth remained in the Reserve Squadron through 1911, being periodically reactivated to participate in annual fleet maneuvers in III Squadron. Brandenburg briefly served with the Training and Experimental Ships Unit in mid-1911. At the end of the year, they were decommissioned once again, their place in the unit being taken by other battleships as the latest dreadnought battleships entered service. They were allocated to the Marinestation der Ostsee (Baltic Sea Naval Station) and laid up in Kiel.

They were mobilized in August 1914 following the outbreak of World War I. They were assigned to V Battle Squadron, which was tasked with coastal defense in the North Sea to guard against attacks by the British Royal Navy. V Squadron was moved to the Baltic in September to support an amphibious assault against Russian forces in Windau, but a shortage of transports led to the cancellation of the operation. Crew shortages forced the navy to decommission the V Squadron ships in Kiel in early 1915, but after German forces seized the port of Libau, Brandenburg and Wörth were reactivated and moved there to guard the harbor. Brandenburg was then converted into a water distillation and barracks ship and her guns were removed. Wörth remained in commission as the flagship of KAdm Alfred Begas, the commander of V Squadron, but she saw no action in Libau.

V Squadron was disbanded in January 1916, and Wörth steamed to Danzig where she was decommissioned and converted into a barracks ship. She, too, was disarmed, and her guns were rebuilt into "Kurfürst" railroad guns. Brandenburg's guns were intended to be sent to the Ottoman Empire as spares for Turgut Reis, but there is no evidence they were actually sent. She was to be converted into a target ship, but the war ended before work could be completed. Owing to the severe shortage of merchant shipping after the war, plans were proposed to rebuild Wörth into a freighter, but the plans came to nothing. Both ships were struck from the naval register on 13 May 1919 and sold to ship breakers, both vessels being dismantled in Danzig.

=== Barbaros Hayreddin and Turgut Reis ===
On entering service with the Ottoman Navy, Kurfürst Friedrich Wilhelm and Weissenburg became Barbaros Hayreddin and Turgut Reis, respectively. After entering service with the Ottoman fleet, the ships suffered from chronic machinery problems, as their crews were not trained to properly maintain their propulsion systems, which reduced their speed to 8 to 10 knots (15 to 19 km/h; 9 to 12 mph). At the outbreak of the Italo-Turkish War in September 1911, the Ottoman fleet withdrew into the safety of the Dardanelles to avoid confrontation with the much stronger Italian Regia Marina (Royal Navy). Having been neglected by their crews during the conflict, they were in even worse condition by the end of the war in October 1912, with their telephone systems out of service and many of their watertight doors unable to close. Their rangefinders and the ammunition hoists for their main battery guns had been removed.

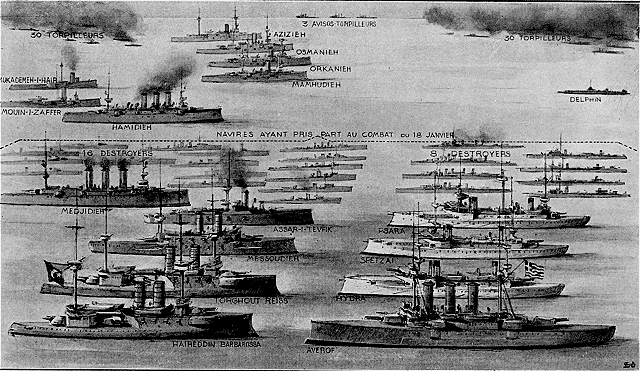
Illustration of the order of battle at the Battle of Lemnos

With the Italo-Turkish War all but over by early October, the Balkan League declared war on the Ottomans, having been encouraged by Italy's easy victory. Both ships were pressed into action, initially to support Ottoman forces defending against the advance of Bulgarian troops in Thrace. In December, the fleet was reorganized to challenge the Greek Royal Hellenic Navy in the Aegean Sea; Barbaros Hayreddin was the flagship of the armored division. The division sortied to attack the Greek fleet in December, leading to the Battle of Elli, where the Greek armored cruiser Georgios Averof used her superior speed to outmaneuver the Ottoman squadron, placing it in a cross-fire between Georgios Averof on one side and the three Hydra-class ironclads on the other. The Ottomans retreated back to the Dardanelles in disorder. A second attempt to break the Greek blockade of the Dardanelles occurred on 18 January 1913, resulting in the Battle of Lemnos. Barbaros Hayreddin and Turgut Reis were both hit several times but suffered relatively minor damage before withdrawing once again to the Dardanelles. The Ottoman fleet spent the rest of the war operating in the Sea of Marmora and the Black Sea against Bulgarian forces, helping to protect the Çatalca garrison through March.

In August 1914, when World War I broke out in Europe, the Ottomans initially remained neutral, but they entered the war on the side of the Central Powers in November. Barbaros Hayreddin and Turgut Reis were partially disarmed in late 1914 and early 1915 to improve the defenses in the Dardanelles, though they retained their main batteries so they could be used as floating batteries to support the Dardanelles fortresses during the Dardanelles campaign. By March 1915, the Ottoman command had decided to keep only one vessel on station at a time so vessels could be withdrawn for maintenance and resupply. In April, the British and French fleets launched the Gallipoli campaign. The British submarine HMS E11 torpedoed and sank Barbaros Hayreddin on 8 August as she moved into position to bombard Allied forces fighting at Gallipoli. The sinking caused the Ottomans to withdraw Turgut Reis, and she remained out of service until January 1918 when she was reactivated to tow the battlecruiser Yavuz Sultan Selim, which had run aground after the Battle of Imbros.

Turgut Reis was again decommissioned in October and remained out of service until she underwent a refit in 1924–1925, thereafter serving as a training ship, by this time with only one of her main battery turrets aboard the vessel. Decommissioned for the final time in 1933, she spent the next seventeen years as a barracks ship, ultimately being slowly broken up between 1950 and 1957.
