= SMS Beowulf =

Coastal defense ship of the German Imperial Navy

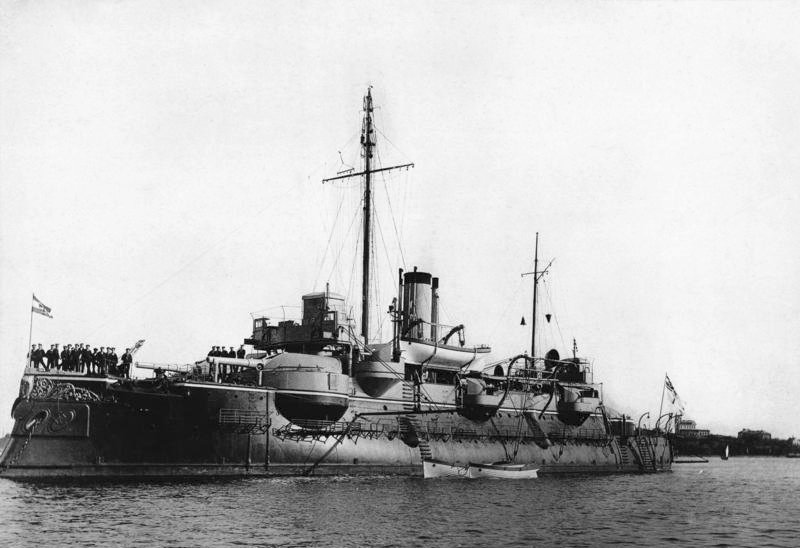
- SMS Beowulf

History

German Empire
- Name: Beowulf
- Namesake: Beowulf
- Builder: AG Weser's works in Bremen
- Laid down: January 1890
- Launched: 8 November 1890
- Commissioned: 1 April 1892
- Decommissioned: 30 November 1918
- Stricken: 17 June 1919
- Fate: Scrapped at Danzig, 1921

General characteristics
- Class & type: Siegfried-class coast defense ship
- Displacement: Normal: 3,500 t (3,400 long tons); Full load: 3,741 t (3,682 long tons)
- Length: 79 m (259 ft 2 in)
- Beam: 14.90 m (48 ft 11 in)
- Draft: 5.74 m (18.8 ft)
- Installed power: 4 × fire-tube boilers; 4,800 PS (3,500 kW)
- Propulsion: 2 × triple-expansion steam engines; 2 × screw propellers
- Speed: 15.1 knots (28.0 km/h; 17.4 mph)
- Range: 4,800 nmi (8,900 km; 5,500 mi) at 10 knots (19 km/h; 12 mph)
- Complement: 20 officers; 256 enlisted men
- Armament: 3 × 24 cm (9.4 in) guns; 8 × 8.8 cm (3.5 in) guns; 4 × 35 cm (13.8 in) torpedo tubes
- Armor: Waterline belt: 240 mm (9.4 in); Deck: 30 mm (1.2 in); Conning tower: 80 mm (3.1 in)

SMS Beowulf was the second vessel of the six-member Siegfried class of coastal defense ships (Küstenpanzerschiffe) built for the German Imperial Navy. Her sister ships were Siegfried, Frithjof, Heimdall, Hildebrand, and Hagen. Beowulf was built by the AG Weser shipyard between 1890 and 1892, and was armed with a main battery of three 24-centimeter (9.4 in) guns. She served in the German fleet throughout the 1890s and was rebuilt in 1900 – 1902. She served in the VI Battle Squadron after the outbreak of World War I in August 1914, but saw no action. Beowulf was demobilized in 1915 and used as a target ship for U-boats thereafter. She was ultimately broken up for scrap in 1921.

== Design ==
In the late 1880s, the German Kaiserliche Marine (Imperial Navy) grappled with the problem of what type of capital ship to build in the face of limited naval budgets (owing to parliamentary objections to naval spending and the cost of dredging the Kaiser Wilhelm Canal). General Leo von Caprivi, the new Chef der Admiralität (Chief of the Admiralty), requested a series of design proposals, which ranged in size from small 2,500 t (2,461-long-ton) coastal defense ships to heavily armed 10,000 t (9,800-long-ton) ocean-going battleships. Caprivi ordered ten coastal defense ships to guard the entrances to the canal, since even opponents of the navy in the Reichstag (Imperial Diet) agreed that such vessels were necessary. The first six of these, the Siegfried class, were based on the smallest proposal. They carried their armament in an unusual layout, with two heavy guns forward that could be independently aimed; tactical doctrine of the day envisioned the ships breaking through an enemy line of battle (as the Austrians had done at the Battle of Lissa in 1866), and the arrangement would have allowed each ship to engage multiple targets.

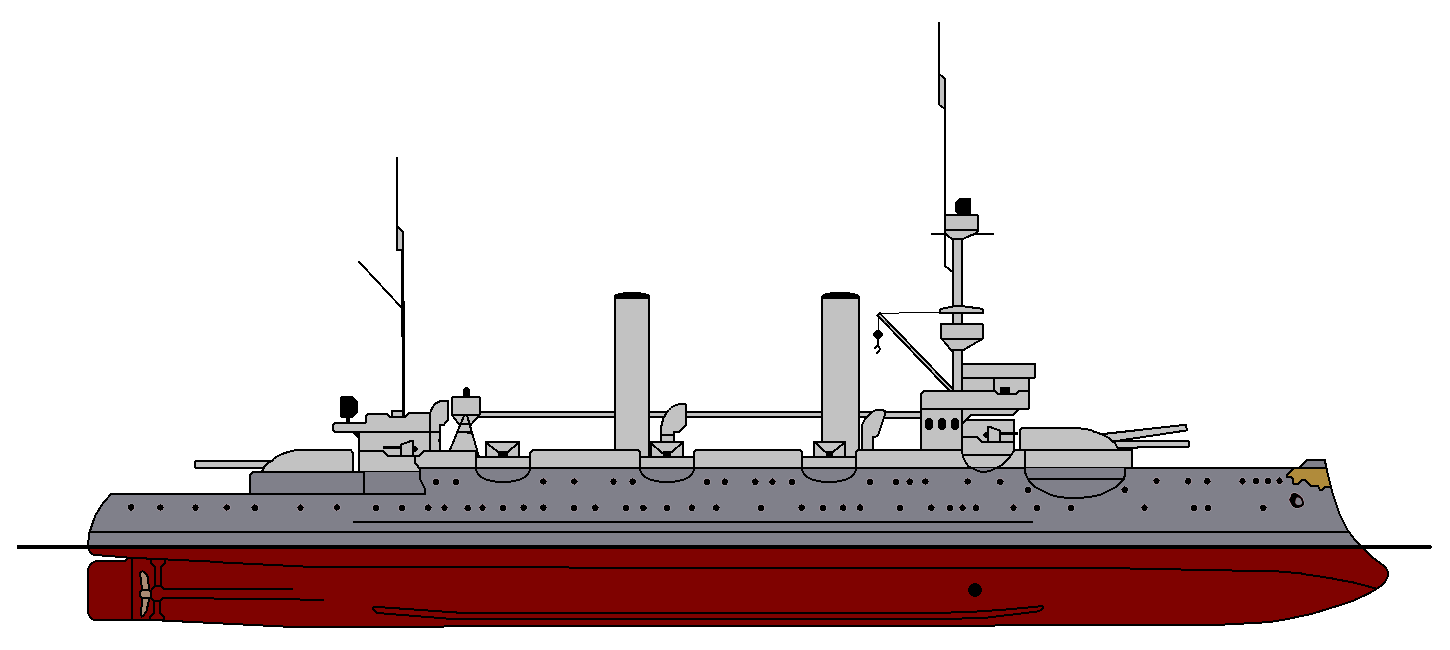
Profile drawing of Hagen in 1910

Beowulf was 79 meters (259 ft) long overall and had a beam of 14.90 m (48.9 ft) and a maximum draft of 5.74 m (18.8 ft). She displaced 3,500 t (3,400 long tons) normally and up to 3,741 t (3,682 long tons) at full load. Her hull had a long forecastle deck that extended most of the vessel's length. She was also fitted with a pronounced ram bow. Beowulf had a crew of 20 officers and 256 enlisted men.

Her propulsion system consisted of two vertical 3-cylinder triple-expansion engines, each driving a screw propeller. Steam for the engines was provided by four coal-fired fire-tube boilers that were vented through a single funnel. The ship's propulsion system provided a top speed of 15.1 knots (28.0 km/h; 17.4 mph) from 4,800 metric horsepower (3,500 kW) and a range of approximately 1,490 nautical miles (2,760 km; 1,710 mi) at 10 kn (19 km/h; 12 mph).

The ship was armed with a main battery of three 24 cm (9.4 in) K L/35 guns mounted in three single gun turrets. Two were placed side by side forward, and the third was located aft of the main superstructure. They were supplied with a total of 204 rounds of ammunition. For defense against torpedo boats, the ship was also equipped with a secondary battery of eight 8.8 cm (3.5 in) SK L/30 guns in single mounts. Beowulf also carried four 35 cm (13.8 in) torpedo tubes, all in swivel mounts on the deck. One was at the bow, another at the stern, and two amidships. The ship was protected by an armored belt that was 240 mm (9.4 in) in the central citadel, and an armored deck that was 30 mm (1.2 in) thick. The conning tower had 80 mm (3.1 in) thick sides.

=== Modifications ===
In 1897, the ship had her anti-torpedo nets removed. Beowulf was extensively rebuilt between 1900 and 1902 in an attempt to improve her usefulness. The ship was lengthened to 86.13 m (282.6 ft), which increased displacement 4,320 t (4,250 long tons; 4,760 short tons) at full load. The lengthened hull space was used to install additional boilers; her old fire-tube boilers were replaced with more efficient water-tube boilers, and a second funnel was added. The performance of her propulsion machinery increased to 15.1 knots (28.0 km/h; 17.4 mph) from 5,078 metric horsepower (3,735 kW), with a maximum range of 3,400 nmi (6,300 km; 3,900 mi) at 10 knots. Her secondary battery was increased to ten 8.8 cm guns, and the 35 cm torpedo tubes were replaced with three 45 cm (17.7 in) tubes. Her crew increased to 20 officers and 287 enlisted men. Work was completed by 1900.

== Service history ==
=== Construction – 1894 ===
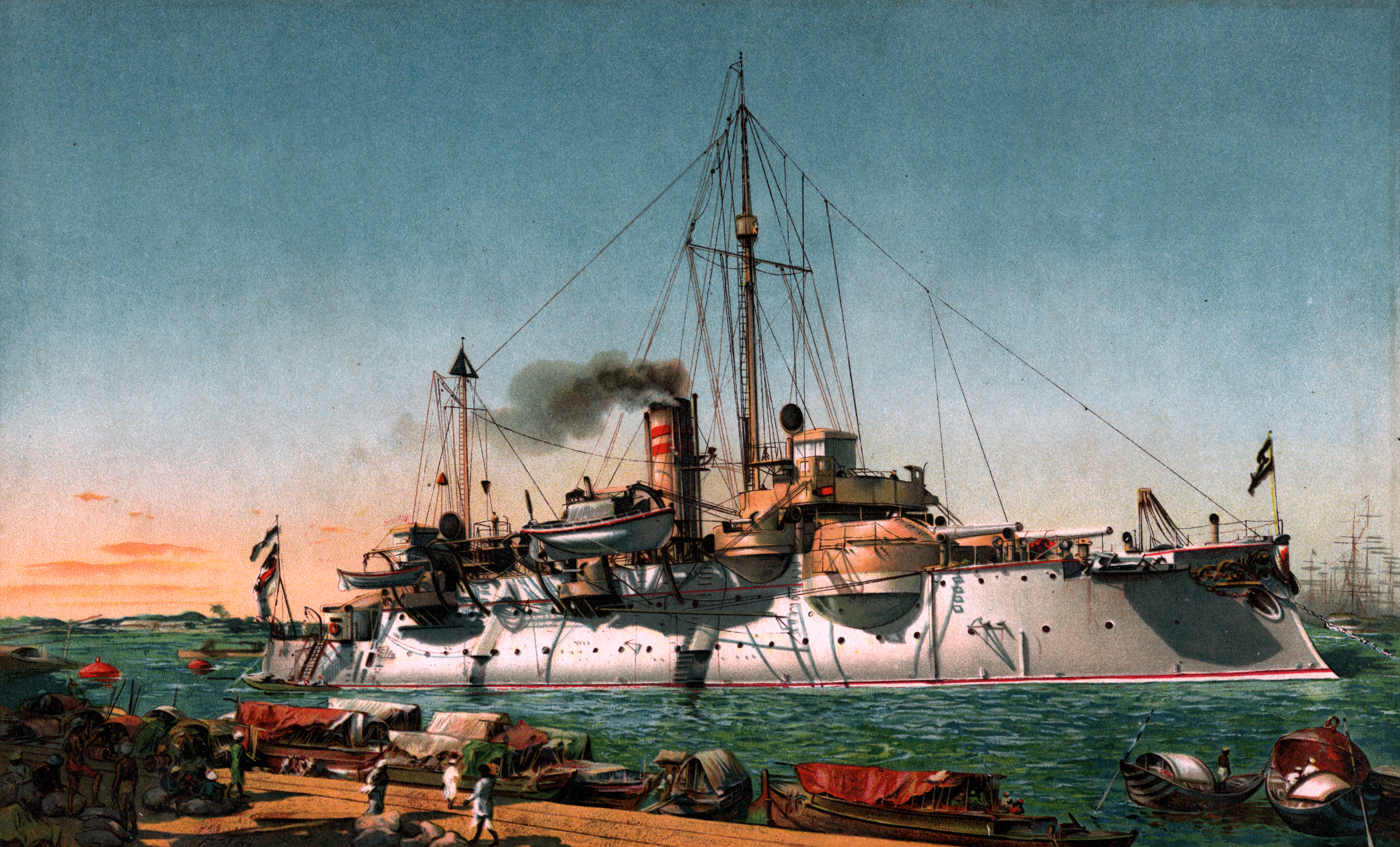
Lithograph of Beowulf in 1902

Beowulf was laid down in January 1890 at the AG Weser shipyard in Bremen under the contract name "P". (Note: German warships were ordered under provisional names. Additions to the fleet were given a single letter; ships intended to replace older or lost vessels were ordered as "Ersatz (name of the ship to be replaced)".) She was launched on 8 November 1890, christened after the legendary Geatish hero Beowulf by Konteradmiral (KAdm—Rear Admiral) Hans von Koester. She was completed in late 1891 and began sea trials thereafter, before being formally commissioned on 1 April 1892. Her first captain was Kapitän zur See (KzS—Captain at Sea) Prince Heinrich of Prussia, the brother of Kaiser Wilhelm II. The ship's trials were interrupted by the need for the ship to join the maneuver squadron to replace her sister ship Siegfried after the latter vessel suffered a boiler explosion that necessitated lengthy repairs. She joined I Division of the fleet for its annual training exercises, along with the three ironclads Baden, Bayern, and Württemberg. At this time, the capital ships of the fleet were organized into a maneuver squadron for training exercises each year, spending the winter out of commission. In April, she embarked Wilhelm II, Frederick Augustus II, Grand Duke of Oldenburg, and Vizeadmiral (Vice Admiral) Friedrich von Hollmann, the chief of the Reichsmarineamt (Imperial Navy Office), for a voyage from Wilhelmshaven to the island of Helgoland in the German Bight and back.

The ship then went to Kiel to resume her trials, though these were interrupted again by a naval review held to welcome Tsar Alexander III of Russia and his son Nicholas, both of whom came aboard along with Wilhelm II to visit Beowulf. The ship then completed her trials and rejoined the maneuver squadron on 19 June, which relocated to the North Sea shortly thereafter. The ship was sent to escort Wilhelm II aboard his yacht Kaiseradler for a voyage from 30 July to 8 August to Britain to observe the Cowes Regatta, held off the Isle of Wight. On the way back, Beowulf lay off Amrum for four days before proceeding to Kiel, where she joined the rest of the maneuver squadron on 17 August. There, the annual, large-scale fleet maneuvers began. Following the conclusion of the exercises, Beowulf returned to Wilhelmshaven on 29 September, where she was reassigned to II Division, replacing the old ironclad Friedrich der Grosse. That month, Prince Heinrich was replaced by Korvettenkapitän (KK—Corvette Captain) Kries, though his tenure as the ship's captain was brief, and he was in turn replaced in December by KK Rudolf von Eickstedt.

Unlike in previous years, where the fleet was decommissioned over the winter months, Beowulf remained on active service through the winter of 1892–1893, when she and Siegfried joined the elderly ironclads König Wilhelm and Deutschland for a winter training cruise in the Mediterranean Sea. Beowulf was assigned to II Division for the 1893 training year; the unit also included her recently commissioned sister Frithjof and several old ironclads. On the first set of maneuvers, Beowulf and the other capital ships performed as the hostile French fleet, which was "attacked" by torpedo boats in the North Sea. The second set of maneuvers took place in the Baltic Sea, and Beowulf and the ironclads again simulated a French fleet. After the end of the annual exercises, she was assigned to the Reserve Division of the North Sea on 1 October with a reduced crew. On 1 February 1894, Beowulf became the flagship of the Reserve Division, and after her crew was replenished under the command of KK August Gruner, conducted short training cruises in the North and Baltic Seas. On 19 August, she was assigned to IV Division of II Squadron, which was created for the duration of the fleet maneuvers. Beowulf was decommissioned on 2 October for repairs to her boilers, which were leaking badly; the work was carried out in the Kaiserliche Werft (Imperial Shipyard) in Wilhelmshaven.

=== 1895–1914 ===
Beowulf early in her career

Beowulf remained out of service until 1 August 1895, when she was recommissioned for the annual fleet maneuvers with KK Karl Ascher as her captain. She returned to IV Division, II Squadron for the exercises, after which she replaced her sister Hildebrand as the flagship of the Reserve Division in September. At that time, KK Eduard Holzhauer relieved Ascher. She took a pair of short training cruises in the Baltic in October and November. The year 1896 passed without incident of note for Beowulf; as in previous years, she served with IV Division during the fleet maneuvers in August and September. Afterward, KK August von Heeringen replaced Holzhauer as the ship's commander. She conducted individual training in the Strander Bucht in October, but on 13 October, she suffered a serious engine breakdown. Beowulf went to Kiel for temporary repairs to allow her to steam to Wilhelmshaven, where she was decommissioned for permanent repairs.

She was recommissioned on 3 August 1897 to participate in the fleet maneuvers, this time in III Division, II Squadron. The ship suffered another breakdown on 13 September, forcing her to return to Wilhelmshaven; repair work lasted until 1 October. When she returned to service, she came under the command of KK Hugo Emsmann. Beowulf spent the rest of the year on training cruises; while cruising off Norway on 15 November, she was caught in a severe storm that forced her to take shelter in the port of Arendal for three days. On 31 May 1898, Beowulf got underway in company with Frithjof for a visit to Norway; the ships stopped in Molde, Ålesund, and Stavanger over the course of the voyage, which concluded in Wilhelmshaven on 11 June. She spent the rest of the year with the normal routine of training exercises with the fleet and individually. In July, KK Wilhelm Kindt temporarily replaced Emsmann as the ship's captain for the duration of the fleet maneuvers, when Emsmann returned to the vessel. KK Hermann Lilie took command of the ship in November. From 12 to 19 November, she visited Gravesend, Britain.

The ship conducted her normal peacetime training exercises in the first half of 1899, thereafter joining III Division for the annual maneuvers from 1 August to 16 September. She was decommissioned in early 1900 for an extensive reconstruction, which was carried out at the Kaiserliche Werft in Danzig. Work began on 15 May and was completed by mid-1902; after completing sea trials, she was recommissioned on 1 July under the command of KK Carl Paschen. She participated in the annual fleet maneuvers the next month, and after their conclusion in mid-September, she was decommissioned in Danzig on 25 September. Beowulf was not scheduled to be reactivated for the 1903 training year, but after Hagen suffered a breakdown that required extensive repairs, Beowulf was recommissioned to take her place in II Squadron on 8 July with KK Hartwig von Dassel in command. The fleet exercises concluded on 15 September, and unlike in previous years, Beowulf remained in service in II Squadron, though KK Franz von Holleben replaced Dassel at that time. She took part in a cruise to the Netherlands and Norway with the rest of the squadron in 1904. After the fleet maneuvers that year, Beowulf was replaced in the squadron by the pre-dreadnought battleship Wörth on 23 September and she was allocated to the Reserve Squadron. She was briefly reactivated in 1909 for the annual maneuvers, serving in III Battle Squadron under the command of KzS Gottfried von Dalwigk zu Lichtenfels.

=== World War I ===
An unidentified member of the Siegfried or Odin class on patrol during World War I, c. 1915

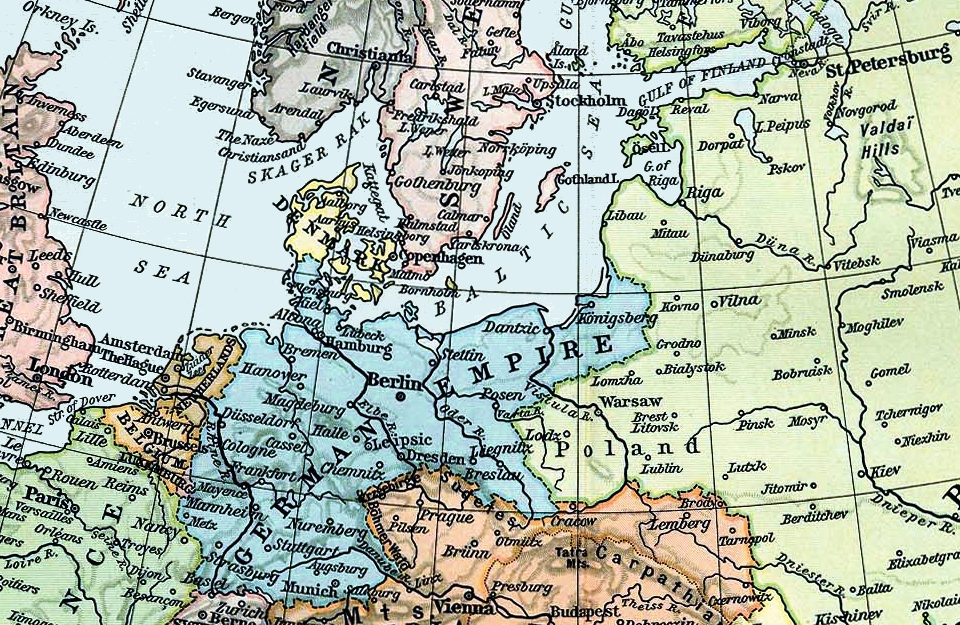
Map of the North and Baltic Seas in 1911

Following the outbreak of World War I in July 1914, Beowulf and her sister ships were mobilized for wartime service. The ship was recommissioned on 12 August under the command of FK Ebert and assigned to VI Battle Squadron, initially attached to the High Seas Fleet, though they were tasked with coastal defense duties. The ships were deployed to guard Germany's North Sea coastline, primarily the mouths of the Ems and Weser rivers and Jade Bay, the location of Wilhelmshaven, the main German naval base in the North Sea.

In May 1915, Beowulf participated in a combined naval and ground assault on the port of Libau in the Baltic. The attack took place on 7 May, and consisted of Beowulf, the armored cruisers Prinz Adalbert, Roon, and Prinz Heinrich, and the light cruisers Augsburg, Thetis, and Lübeck. They were escorted by a number of destroyers, torpedo boats, and minesweepers. The cruisers of IV Scouting Group of the High Seas Fleet was detached from the North Sea to provide cover for the operation. The bombardment went as planned, though the destroyer V107 struck a mine in Libau's harbor, which blew off her bow and destroyed the ship. German ground forces were successful in their assault and they took the city. Beowulf then steamed to Memel, where she lay from 10 to 21 May, before departing for Libau. She then sortied to bombard Russian positions at Windau on 28 June. After the pre-dreadnoughts Brandenburg and Wörth arrived in Libau to relieve Beowulf on 12 July, she departed for Danzig for maintenance, which included a thorough re-tubing of her boilers.

Work on the ship was completed on 8 September, allowing her to return to guard duties in the North Sea three days later. She largely operated off Borkum during this period. On 31 August, VI Squadron was disbanded, though Beowulf remained on patrol duty, now assigned to the Coastal Defense Division of the Ems, operating here until 28 February 1916. Having been withdrawn from front-line service, she had her crew reduced on 2 March, and she was thereafter employed as a target ship for U-boats and as a tender for the light cruiser Hamburg, the flagship of the Leader of U-boats. At that time, Kapitänleutnant (Captain Lieutenant) Franz Strauch relieved Ebert as the ship's commander. On 12 March 1917, Beowulf was decommissioned in Danzig.

She was recommissioned on 12 December for use as an icebreaker, and was thus employed from January to March 1918. During that period, she supported the German intervention in the Finnish Civil War, which was centered on the two dreadnought battleships Westfalen and Rheinland. Men from Beowulf's crew were used to commission two formerly Russian gunboats, Golub and Pingvin, which were renamed Beo and Wulf; these vessels were later used by the early Finnish Navy after the war. Beowulf later left Helsingfors, Finland, for maintenance at Libau that lasted from 27 May to 24 July. While Beowulf was still undergoing repairs, she became the flagship of KAdm Ludolf von Uslar on 1 June, who was then the commander of naval forces in the eastern Baltic, though he rarely came aboard the vessel during his tenure. The ship left Libau on 8 August, steaming first to Helsingfors and then to Reval to join preparations for the planned Operation Schlussstein, though the operation was cancelled on 1 September. Following Germany's defeat on 11 November, Beowulf returned to Danzig, where she was decommissioned on 30 November. On 17 June 1919, she was stricken from the naval register and was later sold to Norddeutsche Tiefbaugesellschaft of Berlin. Beowulf was broken up for scrap in 1921 in Danzig.
