= Kaiserliche Werft Wilhelmshaven 947 =

No. 947
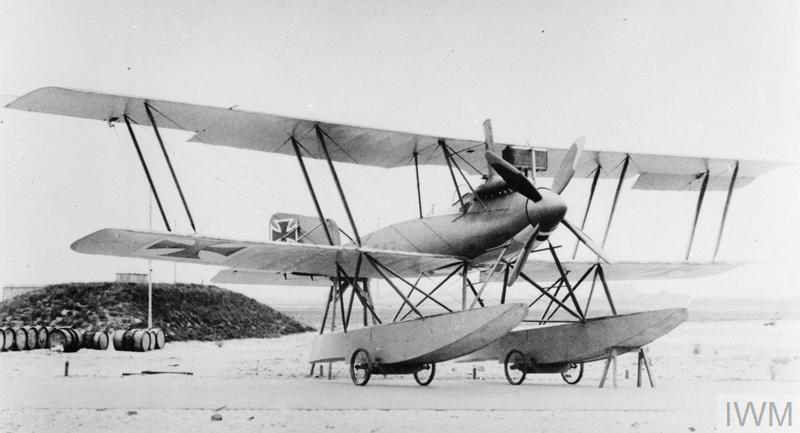
- A forward oblique view of the Kaiserliche Werft Wilhelmshaven 947

General information
- Type: Maritime reconnaissance floatplane
- National origin: Germany
- Manufacturer: Kaiserliche Werft Wilhelmshaven
- Number built: 1

History
- First flight: 1916

The Kaiserliche Werft Wilhelmshaven 947 was a maritime reconnaissance floatplane built for the Imperial German Navy's (Kaiserliche Marine) Naval Air Service (Marine-Fliegerabteilung) during the First World War, the sole example of its type. It was one of only three armed aircraft built by the Kaiserliche Werft Wilhelmshaven amongst a variety of trainer seaplanes that they had produced for the Navy during the course of the war. Number 947 was a two-bay biplane of conventional design, with twin pontoon undercarriage, and two open cockpits in tandem. It received the Naval classification CHFT, indicating an armed aircraft equipped with radio gear capable of both sending and receiving.

The design bore a resemblance to a pair of trainer seaplanes produced at Wilhelmshaven (Nos 461–462) and to a design from Kaiserliche Werft Kiel (Nos 463–466), and all three designs could have been the work of the same designer or designers. The machine was evaluated by the seaplane testing unit (SVK – Seeflugzeug-Versuchskommando) at Warnemünde at some point, but the records that have survived are somewhat contradictory. In any case, no further examples were constructed.

== Specifications ==
Data from Kroschel & Stützer 1994, p.145, Gray & Thetford 1962, p.451

General characteristics

- Crew: Two, pilot and observer
- Length: 13.00 m (42 ft 8 in)
- Wingspan: 15.95 m (52 ft 4 in)
- Height: 4.00 m (13 ft 2 in)
- Powerplant: 1 × Mercedes D.IV , 160 kW (220 hp)

Armament

- 1 × trainable 7.9 mm machine gun
