= Kaiserliche Werft Wilhelmshaven 461 =

German seaplane

No. 461–462
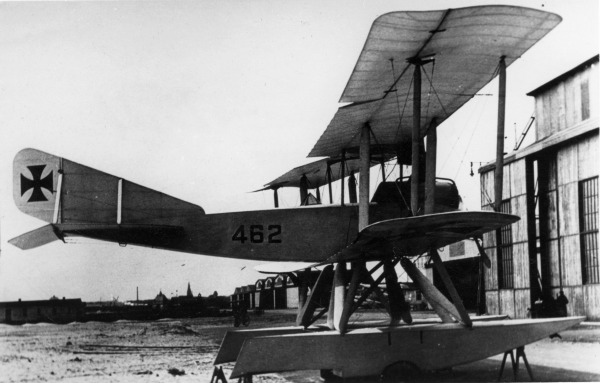
- Kaiserliche Werft Wilhelmshaven 462

General information
- Type: Training seaplane
- National origin: Germany
- Manufacturer: Kaiserliche Werft Wilhelmshaven
- Primary user: Imperial German Navy
- Number built: 2

History
- First flight: 1916

Imperial German Navy seaplanes 461 and 462 were the only two examples of a seaplane design produced for the Navy's flying service during the First World War. Number 461 was built in October 1916 and Number 462 in September 1917 as the German seaplane bases searched for purpose-built training aircraft to supplement their collection of retired combat types.

This particular design, one of several developed by the Kaiserliche Werften, was a conventional, two-bay biplane with wings of unequal span. The pilot and instructor sat in tandem, open cockpits, and the undercarriage consisted of twin pontoons. It is possible that the design was related to one group of seaplane trainers built at Kaiserliche Werft Kiel (No 463–466) and also to that of an armed reconnaissance seaplane (No 947) later built at Wilhelmshaven. However, the rear fuselages and empennages of No 461 and 462 differed significantly from the machines built at Kiel.

== Specifications ==
Data from Kroschel & Stützer 1994, p.154, Gray & Thetford 1962, p.451

General characteristics

- Crew: Two, pilot and instructor
- Length: 9.50 m (31 ft 2 in)
- Wingspan: 14.0 m (48 ft 11 in)
- Height: 3.90 m (12 ft 10 in)
- Wing area: 52 m^{2} (562 sq ft)
- Empty weight: 1,016 kg (2,235 lb)
- Gross weight: 1,585 kg (3,487 lb)
- Powerplant: 1 × Benz Bz.III , 110 kW (150 hp)

Performance

- Maximum speed: 143 km/h (90 mph, 78 kn)
- Rate of climb: 1.6 m/s (310 ft/min)
