= Kaiserliche Werft Kiel 463 =

No. 463–466
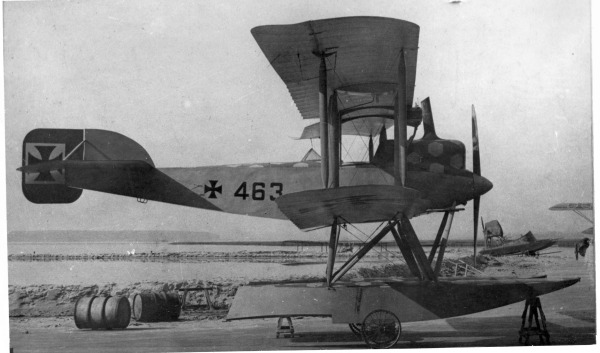

General information
- Type: Training seaplane
- National origin: Germany
- Manufacturer: Kaiserliche Werft Kiel
- Primary user: Imperial German Navy

History
- First flight: 1917

Imperial German Navy seaplanes 463 to 466 were a unique seaplane design produced for the Navy's flying service during the First World War. The seaplane base at Kiel-Holtenau ordered the type as a training aircraft in 1915, and the Navy allocated a batch of four serial numbers to the design. No 463 and its siblings were conventional, two-bay biplanes with unstaggered wings of equal span and two open cockpits in tandem for the pilot and instructor. The undercarriage consisted of twin pontoons. The large, square rudder was hinged to the rear end of the fuselage, and extended below the ventral line of the fuselage. The inline engine was neatly cowled in, with the exhaust being collected together in a single stack that extended above the upper wing.

Kaiserliche Werft Kiel received an order for three machines in October 1915, and the first of these (No 463) was delivered to the seaplane testing unit (SVK – Seeflugzeug-Versuchskommando) at Warnemünde the following summer. It remained there under test for well over one year, and was not finally accepted for service until summer 1918. This lengthy delay was possibly due to the aircraft being used as a trainer at Warnemünde itself.

Two of the seaplane trainers (No 461–462) built at Kaiserliche Werft Wilhelmshaven were possibly built to substantially the same design, as was possibly one of the reconnaissance seaplanes (No 947) built there.

== Specifications ==
Data from Kroschel & Stützer 1994, p.154

General characteristics

- Crew: Two, pilot and instructor
- Powerplant: 1 × Benz Bz.III , 110 kW (150 hp)
