= SMS Hildebrand =

Coastal defense ship of the German Imperial Navy

- SMS Hildebrand early in her career

History

German Empire
- Name: Hildebrand
- Namesake: Hildebrand
- Builder: Kaiserliche Werft in Kiel
- Laid down: 9 December 1890
- Launched: 6 August 1892
- Commissioned: 28 October 1893
- Decommissioned: 16 January 1916
- Stricken: 17 June 1919
- Fate: Sunk off Dutch coast, 1919, scrapped 1933

General characteristics
- Class & type: Siegfried-class coast defense ship
- Displacement: Normal: 3,500 t (3,400 long tons); Full load: 3,741 t (3,682 long tons)
- Length: 79 m (259.2 ft)
- Beam: 14.8 m (48.6 ft)
- Draft: 5.74 m (18.8 ft)
- Installed power: 4 × fire-tube boilers; 4,800 PS (3,500 kW)
- Propulsion: 2 × triple-expansion steam engines; 2 × screw propellers
- Speed: 14.8 knots (27.4 km/h; 17.0 mph)
- Range: 4,800 nmi (8,900 km; 5,500 mi) at 10 knots (19 km/h; 12 mph)
- Complement: 20 officers; 256 enlisted men
- Armament: 3 × 24 cm (9.4 in) guns; 8 × 8.8 cm (3.5 in) guns; 4 × 35 cm (13.8 in) torpedo tubes
- Armor: Waterline belt: 240 mm (9.4 in); Deck: 30 mm (1.2 in); Conning tower: 80 mm (3.1 in)

SMS Hildebrand was the fifth vessel of the six-member Siegfried class of coastal defense ships (Küstenpanzerschiffe) built for the German Imperial Navy. Her sister ships were Siegfried, Beowulf, Frithjof, Heimdall, and Hagen. Hildebrand was built by the Kaiserliche Werft (Imperial Shipyard) at Kiel between 1890 and 1893, and was armed with a main battery of three 24-centimeter (9.4 in) guns. She served in the German fleet throughout the 1890s and was rebuilt in 1900–1902. She served in the VI Battle Squadron after the outbreak of World War I in August 1914, but saw no action. Hildebrand was demobilized in 1915 and used as a barracks ship thereafter. She ran aground while en route to the Netherlands for scrapping in 1919, and was eventually broken up in situ in 1933.

== Design ==
In the late 1880s, the German Kaiserliche Marine (Imperial Navy) grappled with the problem of what type of capital ship to build in the face of limited naval budgets (owing to parliamentary objections to naval spending and the cost of dredging the Kaiser Wilhelm Canal). General Leo von Caprivi, the new Chef der Admiralität (Chief of the Admiralty), requested a series of design proposals, which ranged in size from small 2,500 t (2,461-long-ton) coastal defense ships to heavily armed 10,000 t (9,800-long-ton) ocean-going battleships. Caprivi ordered ten coastal defense ships to guard the entrances to the canal, since even opponents of the navy in the Reichstag (Imperial Diet) agreed that such vessels were necessary. The first six of these, the Siegfried class, were based on the smallest proposal. They carried their armament in an unusual layout, with two heavy guns forward that could be independently aimed; tactical doctrine of the day envisioned the ships breaking through an enemy line of battle (as the Austrians had done at the Battle of Lissa in 1866), and the arrangement would have allowed each ship to engage multiple targets.

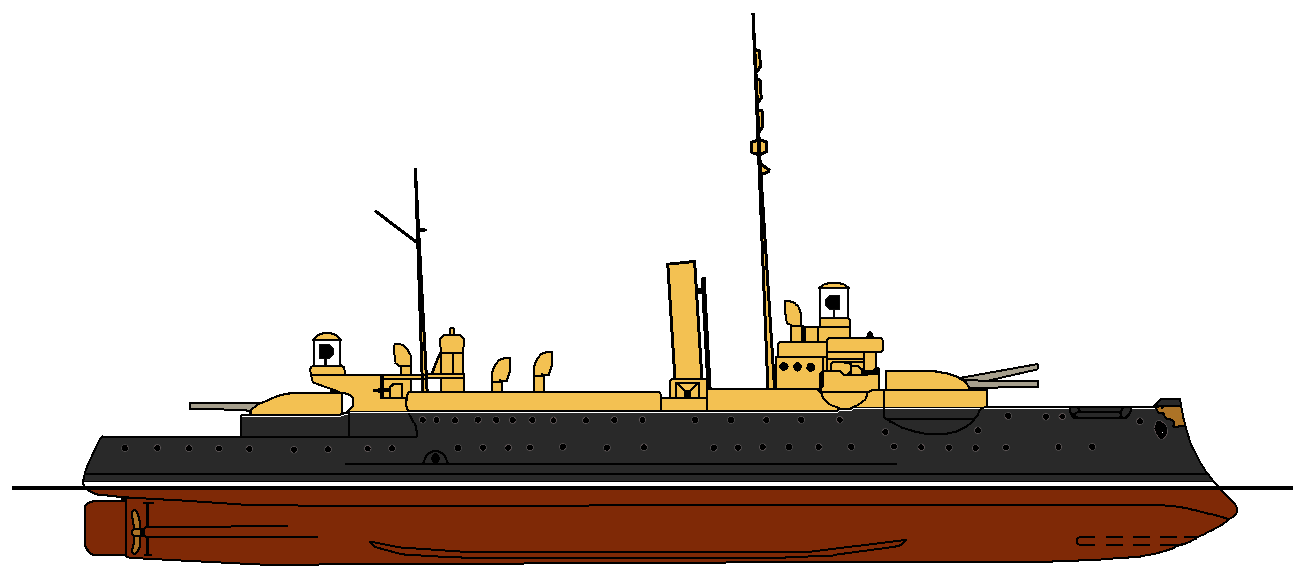
Profile drawing of Siegfried as originally configured; Hildebrand was similar, but had an additional secondary gun amidships

Hildebrand was 79 meters (259 ft) long overall and had a beam of 14.9 m (49 ft) and a maximum draft of 5.74 m (18.8 ft). She displaced 3,500 t (3,400 long tons) normally and up to 3,741 t (3,682 long tons) at full load. Her hull had a long forecastle deck that extended most of the vessel's length. She was also fitted with a pronounced ram bow. Hildebrand had a crew of 20 officers and 256 enlisted men.

Her propulsion system consisted of two vertical 3-cylinder triple-expansion engines, each driving a screw propeller. Steam for the engines was provided by four coal-fired fire-tube boilers that were vented through a single funnel. The ship's propulsion system provided a top speed of 14.8 knots (27.4 km/h; 17.0 mph) from 4,800 metric horsepower (3,500 kW) and a range of approximately 1,490 nautical miles (2,760 km; 1,710 mi) at 10 kn (19 km/h; 12 mph).

The ship was armed with a main battery of three 24 cm (9.4 in) K L/35 guns mounted in three single gun turrets. Two were placed side by side forward, and the third was located aft of the main superstructure. They were supplied with a total of 204 rounds of ammunition. For defense against torpedo boats, the ship was also equipped with a secondary battery of eight 8.8 cm (3.5 in) SK L/30 guns in single mounts. Hildebrand also carried four 35 cm (13.8 in) torpedo tubes, all in swivel mounts on the deck. One was at the bow, another at the stern, and two amidships. The ship was protected by an armored belt that was 240 mm (9.4 in) in the central citadel, and an armored deck that was 30 mm (1.2 in) thick. The conning tower had 80 mm (3.1 in) thick sides.

=== Modifications ===
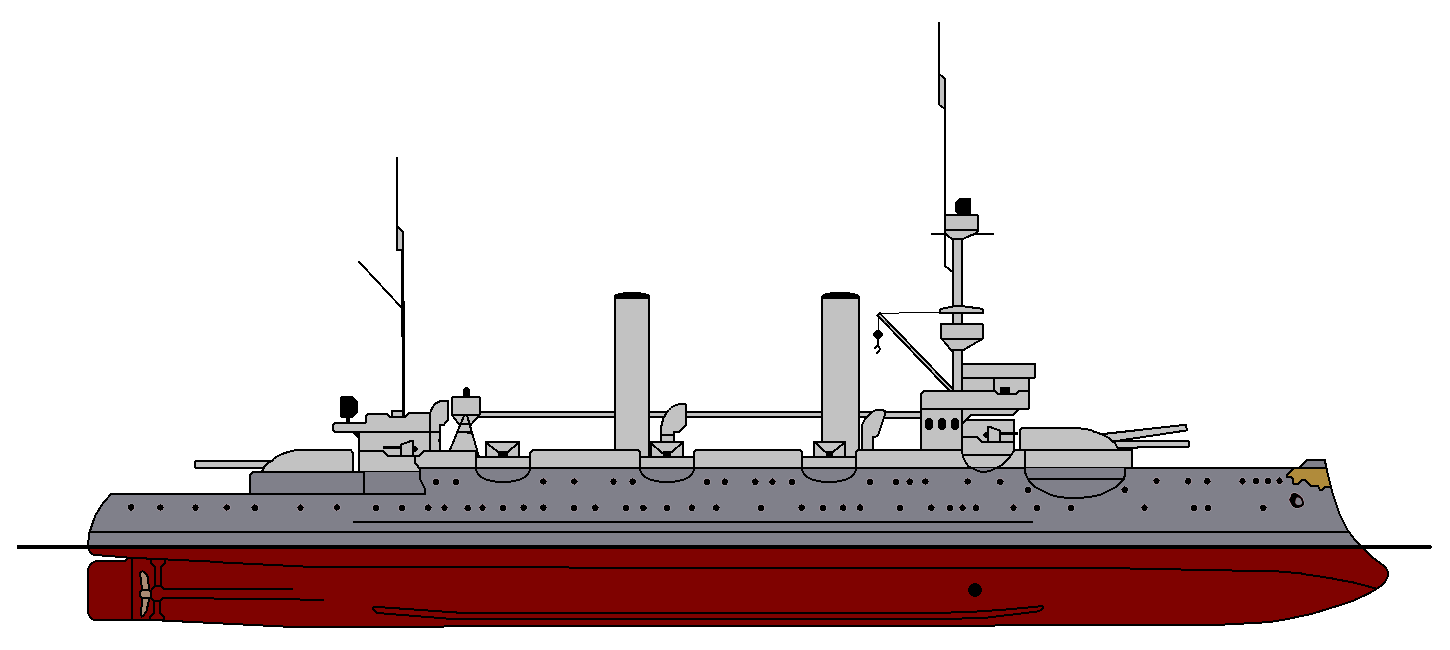
Profile drawing of Hagen in 1910

Hildebrand was modified during construction to serve as a divisional flagship, receiving additional facilities and equipment to support an admiral and his staff. In 1897, the ship had her anti-torpedo nets removed.

Hildebrand was extensively rebuilt between 1901 and 1902 in an attempt to improve her usefulness. The ship was lengthened to 86.13 m (282.6 ft), which increased displacement to 4,236 t (4,169 long tons; 4,669 short tons) at full load. The lengthened hull space was used to install additional boilers; her old fire-tube boilers were replaced with more efficient water-tube boilers, and a second funnel was added. The performance of her propulsion machinery increased to 15.3 knots (28.3 km/h; 17.6 mph) from 5,338 metric horsepower (3,926 kW), with a maximum range of 3,400 nmi (6,300 km; 3,900 mi) at 10 knots. Her secondary battery was increased to ten 8.8 cm guns, and the 35 cm torpedo tubes were replaced with three 45 cm (17.7 in) tubes. Her crew increased to 20 officers and 287 enlisted men. Work was completed by 1900.

== Service history ==
=== Construction – 1899 ===
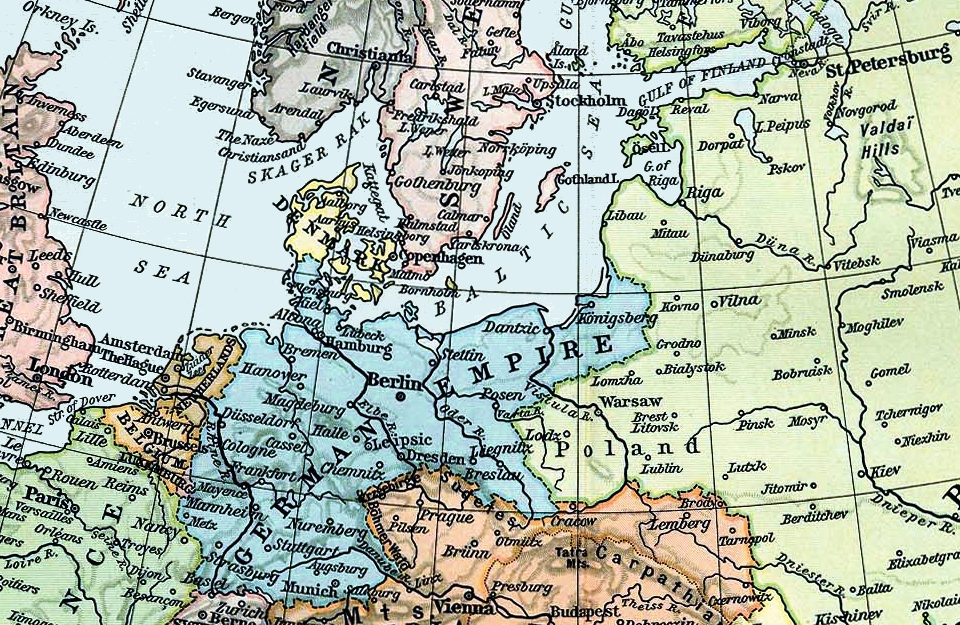
Map of the North and Baltic Seas in 1911

Hildebrand, named for the German legendary character Hildebrand, was laid down in 9 December 1890 at the Kaiserliche Werft (Imperial Shipyard) in Kiel under the contract designation "R". (Note: German warships were ordered under provisional names. Additions to the fleet were given a single letter; ships intended to replace older or lost vessels were ordered as "Ersatz (name of the ship to be replaced)".) She was launched on 6 August 1892, and Vizeadmiral (Vice Admiral) Eduard von Knorr christened the ship at the launching ceremony. The ship was commissioned on 28 October 1893 to begin sea trials, though her initial working up period was interrupted by boiler leaks that had to be repaired. After completing her trials, she was briefly assigned as the guard ship in Kiel from 13 to 16 December, when the torpedo test ship Blücher was ready to take over the role. Hildebrand thereafter returned to the shipyard for repairs before being recommissioned on 1 August 1894; while she was still in the shipyard, Korvettenkapitän (KK–Corvette Captain) Hermann da Fonseca-Wollheim took command of the vessel. Four days later, she was assigned to the Reserve Division of the North Sea, serving as the divisional flagship. At that time, the division commander was Konteradmiral (Rear Admiral) Iwan Friedrich Julius Oldekop.

Hildebrand participated in the fleet maneuvers that year, alongside two of her sister ships in IV Division of the fleet. The division was based in Danzig with some torpedo boats and operated as the German fleet in mock engagements with I Division, which simulated the Russian Baltic Fleet. The exercises concluded on 21 September, and the next day, Hildebrand conducted additional trials in the Baltic Sea until 24 October. She returned to Wilhelmshaven three days later, resuming her role as the Reserve Division's flagship. The first half of 1895 passed with the normal peacetime routine of individual ship training and shooting practice. She joined II Battle Squadron in early June; the unit at that time also included the screw corvette Stein, the flagship of KAdm Otto von Diederichs, and Hildebrand's sister ships Hagen, Heimdall, and Frithjof. Hildebrand remained the flagship of her division in the squadron, again under Oldekop's command from 11 to 26 June. During this period, she was present for the opening of the Kaiser Wilhelm Canal on the 20th. The fleet assembled for annual maneuvers on 19 August; the exercises concluded on 15 September. KK Georg Alexander von Müller served as the ship's captain during the maneuvers. Hildebrand's sister Beowulf replaced her in II Squadron on 27 September, allowing her to return to Wilhelmshaven, where she was decommissioned to return to the Reserve Division.

The ship was recommissioned in 1896 to resume her role as the flagship of IV Division, II Squadron on 9 August for that year's fleet exercises; at that time, the divisional commander was KAdm Walther Koch. The maneuvers were held in the Baltic and North Seas and concluded on 15 September. Hildebrand was again decommissioned in Wilhelmshaven thereafter. Hildebrand was recommissioned in 1897 under the command of KK Georg Janke, as in previous years, to participate in the fleet maneuvers. She served as the flagship of II Squadron as well as the subordinate III Division; the squadron commander was at that time KAdm Paul Hoffmann. The unit was reestablished on 3 August and thereafter steamed to Danzig Bay, where the fleet had assembled by 15 August. The exercises concluded in mid-September and II Squadron was again disbanded on the 21st in Wilhelmshaven. Hildebrand was decommissioned and remained out of service through 1898. The ship was recommissioned for the 1899 fleet maneuvers, once again serving as the II Squadron flagship under KAdm Hoffmann as of 1 August. The exercises lasted from 16 August to 16 September, and Hildebrand was again decommissioned six days later.

=== 1900–1914 ===
Hildebrand was recommissioned on 26 March 1900, under the command of KK Hermann Lilie, to replace Beowulf as the deputy command flagship of the Reserve Coastal Defense Division. Over the following months, she embarked on training cruises, at times in company with the division flagship, Frithjof, including a visit to Norway in May that included stops in Gudvangen from 19 to 22 May and Bergen from 22 to 25 May. She operated with II Squadron during the fleet maneuvers that year, once again resuming her role as squadron flagship, flying the flag of KAdm Volkmar von Arnim. The exercises began on 15 August and concluded a month later and the squadron was again disbanded on 22 September. Hildebrand then moved to Danzig, where she was decommissioned on 2 October in preparation for a major reconstruction at the Kaiserliche Werft there. She was transferred to the Reserve Division of the Baltic Sea at the same time. Work on the ship started in early 1901, and on 16 June, cutting of the hull began. The reconstruction was completed in mid-1902.

The ship was recommissioned on 1 July 1902 and returned to II Squadron on 30 July, taking up the position of deputy commander flagship, flying the pennant of KAdm Carl Galster. She took part in the fleet maneuvers from 17 August to 18 September. Following the end of the exercises, KK Wilhelm Becker took command of the vessel. As in previous years, the squadron was disbanded on 21 September, but Hildebrand remained in commission and thereafter cruised the Baltic, visiting ports as far as Helsingfors. KK Paul Schlieper temporarily relieved Becker from May to July, when now-Fregattenkapitän (FK—Frigate Captain) Becker returned to the vessel. II Squadron was reformed on 4 July 1903 and KAdm Rudolf von Eickstedt, the deputy squadron commander, came aboard Hildebrand on 30 July. The year's training maneuvers began soon thereafter and concluded on 12 September. Immediately afterward, the German fleet was reorganized from the Heimatflotte (Home Fleet) to the Aktiven Schlachtflotte (Active Battle Fleet), and on 22 September, Hildebrand briefly became the flagship of the new II Squadron commander, KAdm Ernst Fritze, until she had to be dry-docked for an overhaul, Fritze thereafter shifting to the pre-dreadnought battleship Kaiser Friedrich III on 8 October and then to the protected cruiser Victoria Louise on the 25th. With work on Hildebrand completed by 31 October, Fritze returned to the vessel and KK Christian Schütz replaced Becker as the ship's commander. At that time, the squadron also included Beowulf, Frithjof, and the coastal defense ship Odin.

Hildebrand remained in the role into 1904; the squadron conducted unit training in mid-1904, followed by a cruise to the Netherlands and Norway in July and August. During the voyage, she stopped in Nieuwediep and Den Helder in the Netherlands and in Bergen, Norway. The ships participated in the annual maneuvers, but following their conclusion, Fritze permanently transferred his flag to Kaiser Friedrich III on 17 September. Hildebrand was then taken to Danzig, where she was decommissioned six days later and allocated to the Reserve Division of the Baltic Sea. Hildebrand was reactivated just once in the next decade, in 1909, to participate in the annual maneuvers as part of III Battle Squadron, part of what was now the High Seas Fleet. The ship was assigned to V Division, along with Beowulf, Siegfried, and Heimdall. The squadron was assembled by 27 July for unit training before the fleet maneuvers began on 16 August. The exercises ended on 6 September, and on the 15th, the squadron was disbanded and Hildebrand was decommissioned in Danzig once more.

=== World War I ===
An unidentified member of the Siegfried or Odin class on patrol during World War I, c. 1915

Following the outbreak of World War I in July 1914, Hildebrand and the other coastal defense ships were mobilized to form VI Battle Squadron. Hildebrand was recommissioned on 12 August, becoming the flagship of the squadron commander, KAdm Richard Eckermann, the same day. The unit consisted of the other five ships of the Siegfried class and the two Odin-class coastal defense ships. The squadron left Danzig on 21 August for Kiel, where they conducted individual and unit training to prepare their crews for wartime service. Eckermann was soon transferred to another position in the High Seas Fleet, and Kapitän zur See (Captain at Sea) Herwarth Schmidt von Schwind replaced him as the squadron commander aboard Hildebrand.

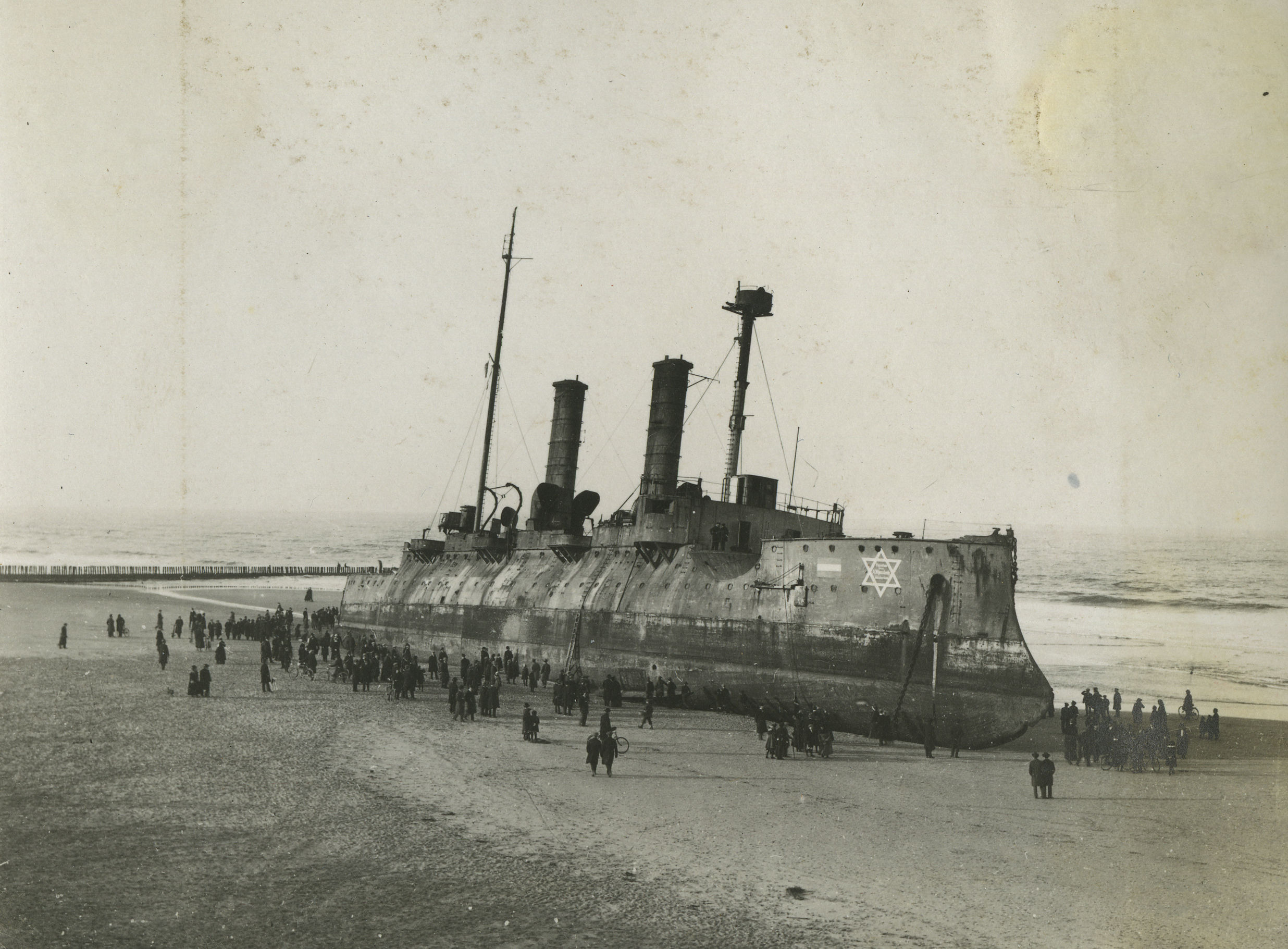
Hildebrand aground, c. 1920

By mid-September, VI Squadron was ready to begin coastal defense patrols in the German Bight, operating primarily in the Jade Bay and the river mouths of Germany's North Sea coast. While there, the squadron was attached to the High Seas Fleet. On 28 September, Hildebrand came to the assistance of Hagen when the latter had run aground off Voslapp and successfully pulled her sister free. When the battlecruisers of I Scouting Group conducted the Raid on Yarmouth on 2–3 November, Hildebrand and the other ships were sent to the outer Jade roadstead to cover their return. Hildebrand was sent to assist the steamship Answald in the outer Jade on 9 December, but was unable to tow her free and instead ran aground herself. Shipyard tugs arrived the next day and pulled both ships free. Hildebrand was seriously damaged in the accident, as both the outer hull plating and the inner plating of the double bottom were badly dented; she was dry-docked at the Kaiserliche Werft in Wilhelmshaven for repairs that lasted from 12 December to 6 April 1915. Schmidt von Schwind transferred his flag to Ägir, which replaced Hildebrand as the squadron flagship for the remainder of the unit's existence.

After returning to service in April 1915, Hildebrand was initially sent to the Jade, before being moved to the mouth of the Elbe. By that time, the German naval command had come to the conclusion that the British Royal Navy would no longer attempt to break into the German Bight or attack coastal shipping in the various river ports. Accordingly, they disbanded VI Squadron on 31 August and dispersed its ships. Hildebrand and Odin were allocated to the harbor flotilla in the Elbe to serve as local guard ships, Hildebrand becoming the flagship of the local command. At the same time, FK Erich von Zeppelin became the ship's captain. Hildebrand saw little activity here and on 9 January 1916, she left for the Baltic, passing through Kiel before arriving in Danzig on 11 January. There, she was decommissioned five days later. She was then used as a distilling ship and an accommodations hulk in Libau and later Windau. While in Windau, her electrical generators were also used to power lights in the harbor. On 17 June 1919, she was stricken from the naval register. She was sold to the Netherlands for scrapping that year, but ran aground off Scheveningen in a severe storm while en route to the breakers on 21 December. The six man crew was successful evacuated from the wreck. In 1933, the vessel was blown up and subsequently broken up in situ.
