= Kaiserliche Werft Wilhelmshaven 945 =

No. 945
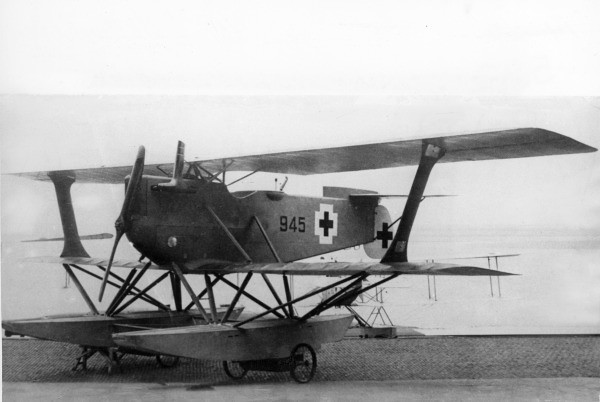

General information
- Type: Fighter seaplane
- National origin: Germany
- Manufacturer: Kaiserliche Werft Wilhelmshaven
- Number built: 1

History
- First flight: 1917

Imperial German Navy seaplane Number 945 was the sole example of a unique seaplane design produced during the First World War. Throughout the war, the Kaiserliche Werft Wilhelmshaven had been producing small numbers of training seaplanes for the German Navy, but as the conflict continued, they built a small number of armed types as well, including Number 945. While the general layout of this aircraft was conventional enough for its day, it included a number of unusual features. The single-bay wings were braced with single, large I-struts, and the vertical stabiliser was virtually non-existent, consisting of little more than a stub on the dorsal side of the rear fuselage. The rudder was hinged to the end of the fuselage and hung down below it. The Navy classified it as a C3MG type; indicating armament with both fixed and trainable machine guns.

Number 945 was ordered in 1917, and a photograph of the completed aircraft exists, bearing its military markings and serial number. However, there is no record of this aircraft ever being delivered to the Navy.

== Specifications ==
Data from Kroschel & Stützer 1994, p.155

General characteristics

- Crew: Two
- Powerplant: 1 × Benz Bz.III , 110 kW (150 hp)

Armament

- 2 × fixed, forward-firing 7.9 mm machine guns
- 1 × trainable 7.9 mm machine gun
