= SMS Hagen =

Coastal defense ship of the German Imperial Navy

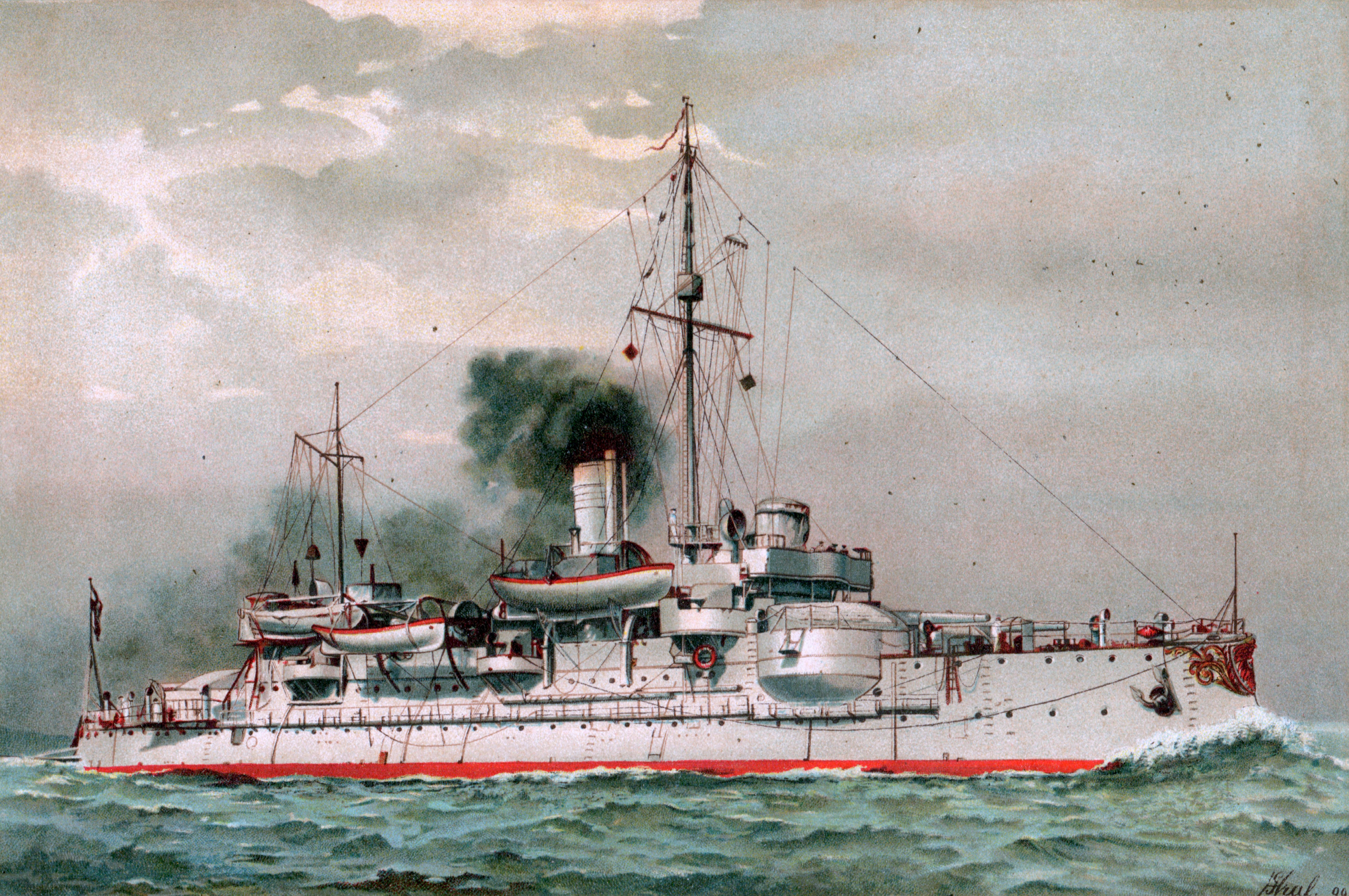
- Lithograph of SMS Hagen from 1902, showing her original configuration

History

German Empire
- Name: Hagen
- Namesake: Hagen
- Builder: Kaiserliche Werft, Kiel
- Laid down: September 1891
- Launched: 21 October 1893
- Commissioned: 2 October 1894
- Decommissioned: September 1915
- Stricken: 17 June 1919
- Fate: Scrapped in the Netherlands, 1919

General characteristics
- Class & type: Siegfried-class coast defense ship
- Displacement: Normal: 3,500 t (3,400 long tons); Full load: 3,741 t (3,682 long tons)
- Length: 79 m (259.2 ft)
- Beam: 14.90 m (48.9 ft)
- Draft: 5.74 m (18.8 ft)
- Installed power: 4 × fire-tube boilers; 4,800 PS (3,500 kW)
- Propulsion: 2 × triple-expansion steam engines; 2 × screw propellers
- Speed: 14.8 knots (27.4 km/h; 17.0 mph)
- Complement: 20 officers; 256 enlisted men
- Armament: 3 × 24 cm (9.4 in) guns; 8 × 8.8 cm (3.5 in) guns; 4 × 35 cm (13.8 in) torpedo tubes
- Armor: Waterline belt: 240 mm (9.4 in); Deck: 30 mm (1.2 in); Conning tower: 80 mm (3.1 in)

SMS Hagen was the final vessel of the six-member Siegfried class of coastal defense ships (Küstenpanzerschiffe) built for the German Imperial Navy. Her sister ships were Siegfried, Beowulf, Frithjof, Heimdall, and Hildebrand. Hagen was built by the Kaiserliche Werft (Imperial Shipyard) in Kiel between 1891 and 1893, and was armed with a main battery of three 24-centimeter (9.4 in) guns. She served in the German fleet throughout the 1890s and was rebuilt in 1900–1902. She served in the VI Battle Squadron after the outbreak of World War I in August 1914, but saw no action. Hagen was demobilized in 1915 and used as a barracks ship thereafter. She was sold for scrap in 1919 and dismantled.

== Design ==
In the late 1880s, the German Kaiserliche Marine (Imperial Navy) grappled with the problem of what type of capital ship to build in the face of limited naval budgets (owing to parliamentary objections to naval spending and the cost of dredging the Kaiser Wilhelm Canal). General Leo von Caprivi, the new Chef der Admiralität (Chief of the Admiralty), requested a series of design proposals, which ranged in size from small 2,500 t (2,461-long-ton) coastal defense ships to heavily armed 10,000 t (9,800-long-ton) ocean-going battleships.

Caprivi ordered ten coastal defense ships to guard the entrances to the canal, since even opponents of the navy in the Reichstag (Imperial Diet) agreed that such vessels were necessary. The first six of these, the Siegfried class, were based on the smallest proposal. They carried their armament in an unusual layout, with two heavy guns forward that could be independently aimed; tactical doctrine of the day envisioned the ships breaking through an enemy line of battle (as the Austrians had done at the Battle of Lissa in 1866), and the arrangement would have allowed each ship to engage multiple targets.

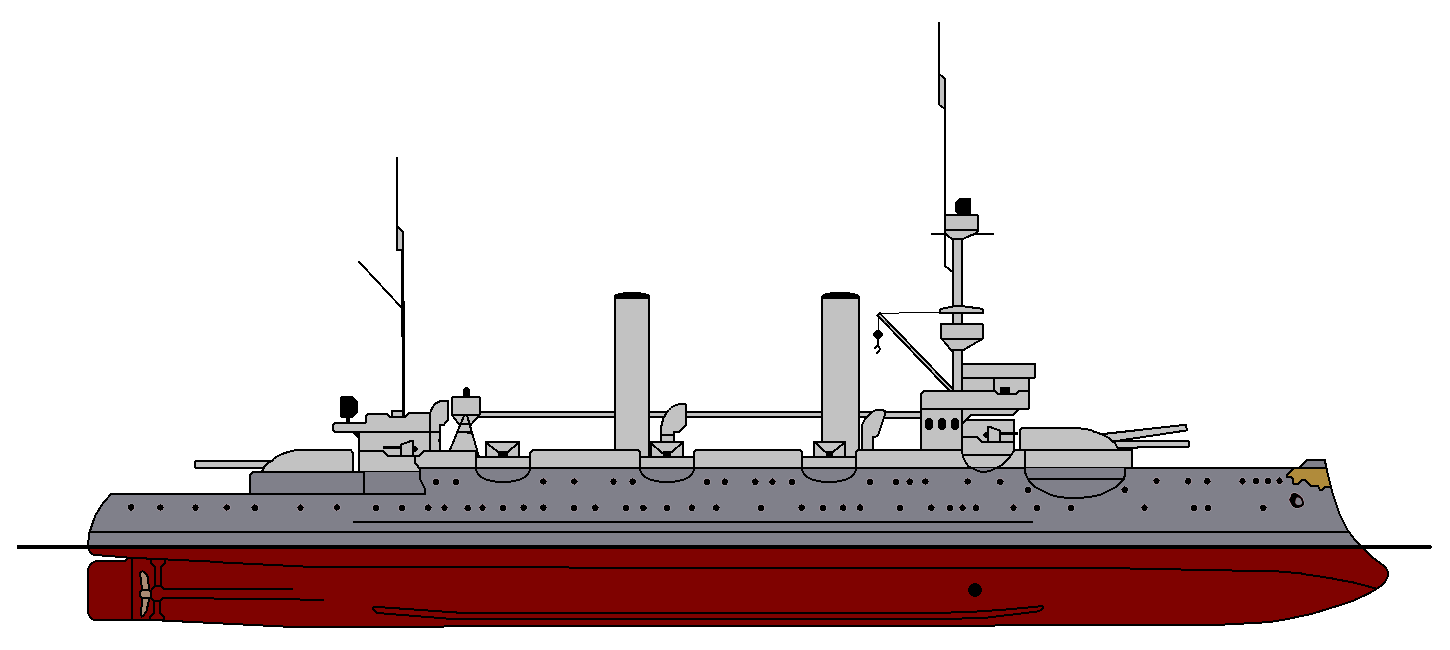
Profile drawing of Hagen in 1910

Hagen was 79 meters (259 ft) long overall and had a beam of 14.90 m (48.9 ft) and a maximum draft of 5.74 m (18.8 ft). She displaced 3,500 t (3,400 long tons) normally and up to 3,741 t (3,682 long tons) at full load. Her hull had a long forecastle deck that extended most of the vessel's length. She was also fitted with a pronounced ram bow. Hagen had a crew of 20 officers and 256 enlisted men.

Her propulsion system consisted of two vertical 3-cylinder triple-expansion engines, each driving a screw propeller. Steam for the engines was provided by four coal-fired fire-tube boilers that were vented through a single funnel. The ship's propulsion system provided a top speed of 14.8 knots (27.4 km/h; 17.0 mph) from 4,800 metric horsepower (3,500 kW) and a range of approximately 1,490 nautical miles (2,760 km; 1,710 mi) at 10 knots (19 km/h; 12 mph).

The ship was armed with a main battery of three 24 cm (9.4 in) K L/35 guns mounted in three single gun turrets. Two were placed side by side forward, and the third was located aft of the main superstructure. They were supplied with a total of 204 rounds of ammunition. For defense against torpedo boats, the ship was also equipped with a secondary battery of eight 8.8 cm (3.5 in) SK L/30 guns in single mounts. Hagen also carried four 35 cm (13.8 in) torpedo tubes, all in swivel mounts on the deck. One was at the bow, another at the stern, and two amidships. The ship was protected by an armored belt that was 240 mm (9.4 in) in the central citadel, and an armored deck that was 30 mm (1.2 in) thick. The conning tower had 80 mm (3.1 in) thick sides. Hagen's armor consisted of new Krupp steel, a more effective type of armor than the compound steel the other members of the class received. The sides of the ship were fitted with anti-torpedo nets.

=== Modifications ===
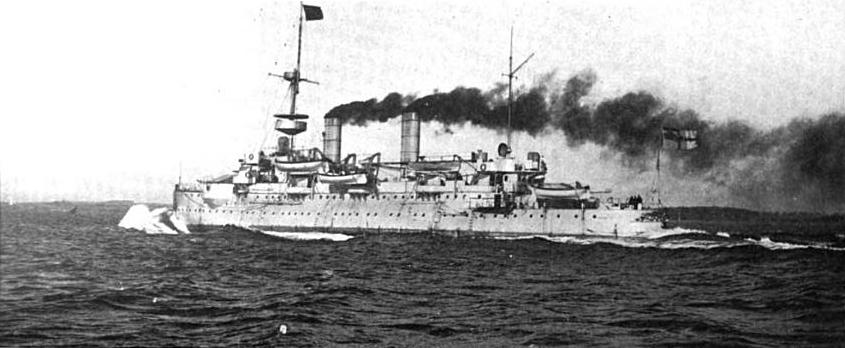
Hagen after her modernization in 1901

In 1897, the ship had her anti-torpedo nets removed. Hagen was extensively rebuilt between 1899 and 1900 in an attempt to improve her usefulness. The ship was lengthened to 86.13 m (282.6 ft), which increased displacement to 4,000 t (3,900 long tons; 4,400 short tons) normally and 4,247 t (4,180 long tons; 4,682 short tons) at full load. The lengthened hull space was used to install additional boilers; her old fire-tube boilers were replaced with more efficient water-tube Thornycroft boilers, and a second funnel was added. The performance of her propulsion machinery increased to 15.3 knots (28.3 km/h; 17.6 mph) from 5,332 metric horsepower (3,922 kW), with a maximum range of 3,400 nmi (6,300 km; 3,900 mi) at 10 knots. Her secondary battery was increased to ten 8.8 cm guns, and the 35 cm torpedo tubes were replaced with three 45 cm (17.7 in) tubes. Her crew increased to 20 officers and 287 enlisted men. Work was completed by 1900.

== Service history ==
=== Construction – 1899 ===
Illustration of Hagen

Hagen, named for the legendary hero Hagen, was laid down in September 1891 at the Kaiserliche Werft (Imperial Shipyard) in Kiel under the provisional designation "S". (Note: German warships were ordered under provisional names. Additions to the fleet were given a single letter; ships intended to replace older or lost vessels were ordered as "Ersatz (name of the ship to be replaced)".) She was launched on 23 October 1893, having been christened by Otto Diederichsen, the director of the shipyard. She was commissioned for sea trials on 2 October 1894, under the command of Korvettenkapitän (Corvette Captain) Karl Rosendahl. She was then assigned to the newly created Reserve Division of the Baltic Sea. The ship embarked on an individual training cruise from 13 May to 2 June 1895 before joining the Reserve Division on 11 June. She was present for the naval review held at the opening of the Kaiser Wilhelm Canal on 25 June.

Hagen was immediately ordered to sail for Morocco in response to an international incident that followed the murder of two German merchants in the country. There, she joined the protected cruiser Kaiserin Augusta, and the old corvettes Marie and Stosch; the German government had demanded 250,000 marks as an indemnity, and the naval squadron was sent to secure it. After completing their mission, Hagen got underway on 10 August to return home, arriving in Wilhelmshaven nine days later. Upon returning, she immediately joined the rest of the fleet for the annual large-scale fleet maneuvers held every August and September. She operated with the Scouting Unit of the fleet for the exercises. On 19 September, she returned to the Reserve Division. At that time, KK von Arend relieved Rosendahl as the ship's commander.

In early 1896, Hagen was assigned as the guard ship for Kiel. KK Adolf Goetz took command of the ship in May. She trained with I Battle Squadron from 28 June to 9 July and then with the Scouting Unit for the annual fleet maneuvers. Following the end of the exercises, KK Guido von Usedom replaced Goetz. She returned to the Reserve Division in 1897, and from 3 August to 25 September, operated with the newly formed II Battle Squadron during the fleet maneuvers, along with her five sister ships. During this period, Hagen served as the flagship of Konteradmiral (KAdm—Rear Admiral) Volkmar von Arnim, one of the squadron's two divisional commanders. The rest of the year passed uneventfully for Hagen. She continued to operate with the squadron in 1898; during training exercises in May, Hagen suffered a boiler explosion on the 31st, forcing her to withdraw from the maneuvers. Unable to steam under her own power, Hagen was taken under tow by the aviso Pfeil, which took her to Kiel for repairs. In July, Usedom was transferred to another vessel and the ship's executive officer, Kapitänleutnant (Captain Lieutenant) August Goette briefly took command before being replaced by KK Paul Walther in August, though his tenure was also brief, as Hagen was decommissioned on 29 September.

=== 1900–1914 ===
Hagen during the extensive reconstruction

In May 1899, she was taken into drydock at the Kaiserliche Werft shipyard in Danzig for an extensive reconstruction. Work was completed in late 1900, and she began sea trials on 2 October under the command of KK Carl Paschen. Following the completion of testing, Hagen steamed to Neufahrwassar on 12 December, where she rejoined the Reserve Division. Following the death of Queen Victoria of Great Britain in January 1901, Hagen joined the ironclad Baden and the protected cruiser Victoria Louise to represent Germany at the funeral ceremony at the Isle of Wight on 31 January. Hagen arrived back in Danzig on 11 February. In May, KK Gerhard Gerdes briefly relieved Paschen as the ship's captain, but Paschen returned in June. She operated with the Reserve Division through to the fleet maneuvers in August, when she was assigned to II Squadron for the duration of the exercise. The ship then went to Kiel for an overhaul. At that time, KK Karl Dick took command of the ship.

The next two years passed in the same pattern of training exercises with the Reserve Division followed by fleet maneuvers in August and September. In September 1902, KK Hartwig von Dassel relieved Dick. The only event of note was a serious engine break down in early July 1903, forcing her to go to the Kaiserliche Werft in Danzig for repairs that lasted from 8 to 30 July. After Hagen reached the shipyard, Fregattenkapitän (FK—Frigate Captain) Eugen Weber took command of the vessel. She took part in the fleet maneuvers that year, thereafter being decommissioned on 17 September and placed in the reserve fleet. Hagen was reactivated only once in the next ten years, to take part in fleet maneuvers in 1909, which began on 22 July and concluded on 15 September; she thereafter returned to the reserve.

=== World War I ===
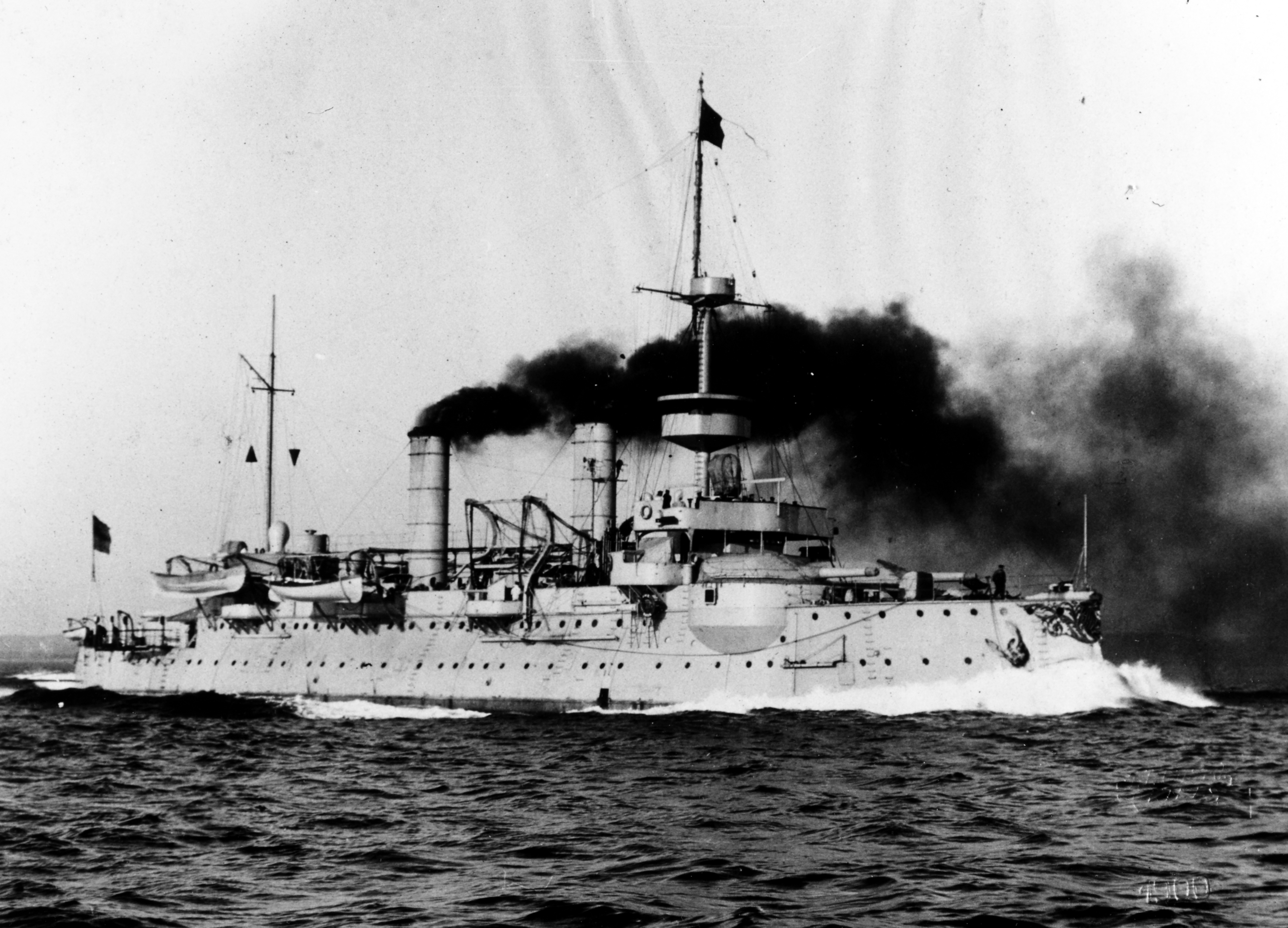
Hagen after her modernization in 1901

Following the start of World War I in July 1914, Hagen was mobilized for wartime service, being recommissioned on 12 August under the command of FK Lebrecht von Klitzing. She was assigned to VI Battle Squadron for coastal defense, along with her sister ships and the two Odin-class coastal defense ships. The unit was initially stationed on Germany's North Sea coast beginning on 15 September. She accidentally ran aground off Voslapp and had to be pulled free by her sister Hildebrand on 28 September. Hagen took part in coastal patrol duty from 29 September to 13 December, alternating between the Jade Bight and the mouth of the Weser. When the battlecruisers of I Scouting Group conducted the Raid on Yarmouth on 2–3 November, Hagen and the other ships were sent to the outer Jade roadstead to cover their return. In the early hours of 4 November, as I Scouting Group returned to the Jade, Hagen came to the aid of the sinking armored cruiser Yorck, helping to evacuate more than half of her crew. That month, FK Kurtz replaced Klitzing as the ship's captain. Hagen was transferred to the mouth of the Ems on 14 December, remaining there on guard duty through 14 June 1915. She thereafter returned to patrol the Jade and Weser for the next two months.

On 30 August 1915, Hagen was withdrawn from guard duty, and the next day, VI Battle Squadron was disbanded. Hagen left Wilhelmshaven on 1 September, bound for Danzig, where she was decommissioned, which allowed Hagen's crew to be transferred to other warships. Beginning in June 1916, she was employed as a barracks ship initially in Libau, to support U-boat crews stationed in the Baltic. She was towed to Danzig on 19 August to serve as a barracks for the crew of the old pre-dreadnought battleship Lothringen, which was at that time on patrol duty in the Danish Straits. She was moved once again, further west to Warnemünde, on 22 September, where she remained through the end of the war. Following Germany's defeat in November 1918, she was struck from the naval register on 17 June 1919. She was sold for scrapping to Norddeutsche Tiefbaugesellschaft of Berlin and broken for scrap.
