= Kaiserliche Werft Wilhelmshaven 401 =

No. 401–403
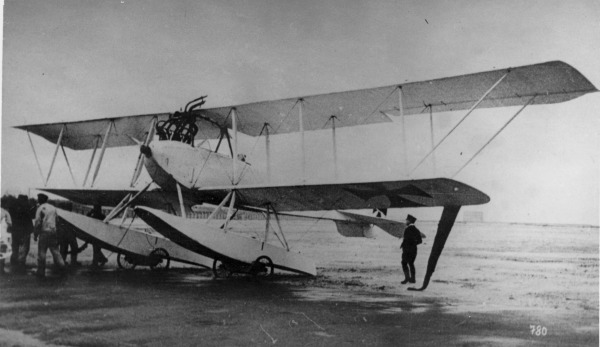

General information
- Type: Training seaplane
- National origin: Germany
- Manufacturer: Kaiserliche Werft Wilhelmshaven
- Primary user: Imperial German Navy
- Number built: 3

History
- First flight: 1915

Imperian German Navy seaplanes numbers 401 to 403 were the only three examples of a unique seaplane design produced for the Navy's flying service during the First World War. Production of these types commenced in April 1915 in an effort to supply the navy with a seaplane trainer of contemporary design. With the outbreak of war, the output of Germany's major seaplane manufacturers was taken up with producing front-line types, and the only trainers available were obsolete or rebuilt machines withdrawn from their original duties. Number 401 and its two siblings were delivered to the Navy in August 1915.

== Specifications ==
Data from Kroschel & Stützer 1994, p.135

General characteristics

- Crew: Two, pilot and instructor
- Powerplant: 1 × Mercedes D.I , 80 kW (107 hp)
