= Kaiserliche Werft Kiel =

German shipyard

- Industry: Shipbuilding
- Founded: 1867
- Defunct: 1918
- Fate: Closed after World War I
- Successor: Deutsche Werke
- Headquarters: Kiel, Germany
- Products: Warships; U-boats

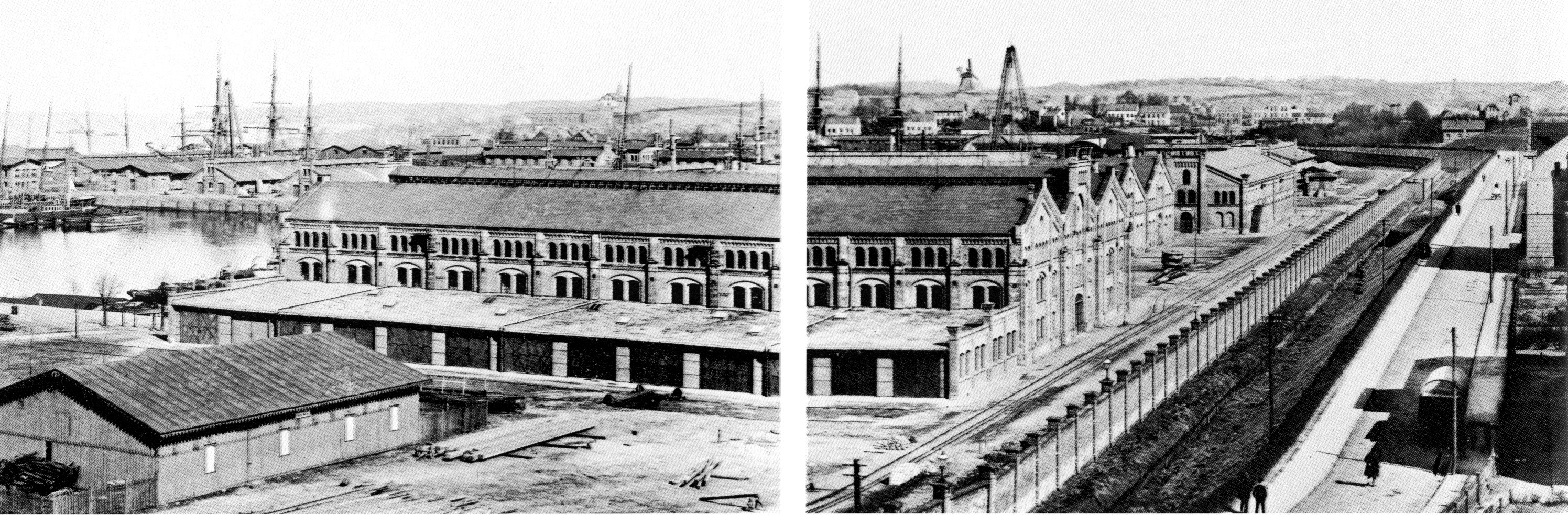
Kaiserliche Werft Kiel

Kaiserliche Werft Kiel (English: Imperial shipyard Kiel) was a German shipbuilding company that was founded in 1867, first as Königliche Werft Kiel but renamed in 1871, with the proclamation of the German Empire. Together with Kaiserliche Werft Danzig and Kaiserliche Werft Wilhelmshaven it was one of three shipyards which produced warships for the Preußische Marine and later the Kaiserliche Marine. With the end of World War I Kaiserliche Werft Kiel was closed, but the shipyard was opened again, when Deutsche Werke was founded on their grounds in 1925 (active until 1945, and re-activated as shipyard by Howaldtswerke-Deutsche Werft in 1955).

== Warships built ==
- Armored frigate SMS Bayern (1878) (1878)
- Armored frigate SMS Baden (1880) (1880)
- Unprotected cruiser SMS Falke (1891) (1891)
- Coastal defense ship SMS Hildebrand (1892)
- Coastal defense ship SMS Hagen (1893)
- Coastal defense ship SMS Ägir (1895)
- Armored cruiser SMS Fürst Bismarck (1897)
- Armored cruiser SMS Prinz Heinrich (1900)
- Armored cruiser SMS Prinz Adalbert (1901)
- Armored cruiser SMS Roon (1903)
- Armored cruiser SMS Blücher (1908)
- Light cruiser SMS Augsburg (1909)
- Kaiser-class battleship SMS Kaiser (1911)
- Light cruiser SMS Graudenz (1913)
- Light cruiser SMS Frankfurt (1915)

== Aircraft ==
- Kaiserliche Werft Kiel 463
