= Kaiserliche Werft Wilhelmshaven =

Former German shipbuilding company

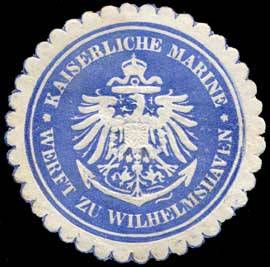
- Industry: Shipbuilding
- Founded: 1871
- Defunct: 1918
- Fate: Closed after World War I
- Successor: Kriegsmarinewerft Wilhelmshaven
- Headquarters: Wilhelmshaven, Germany
- Products: Warships; U-boats

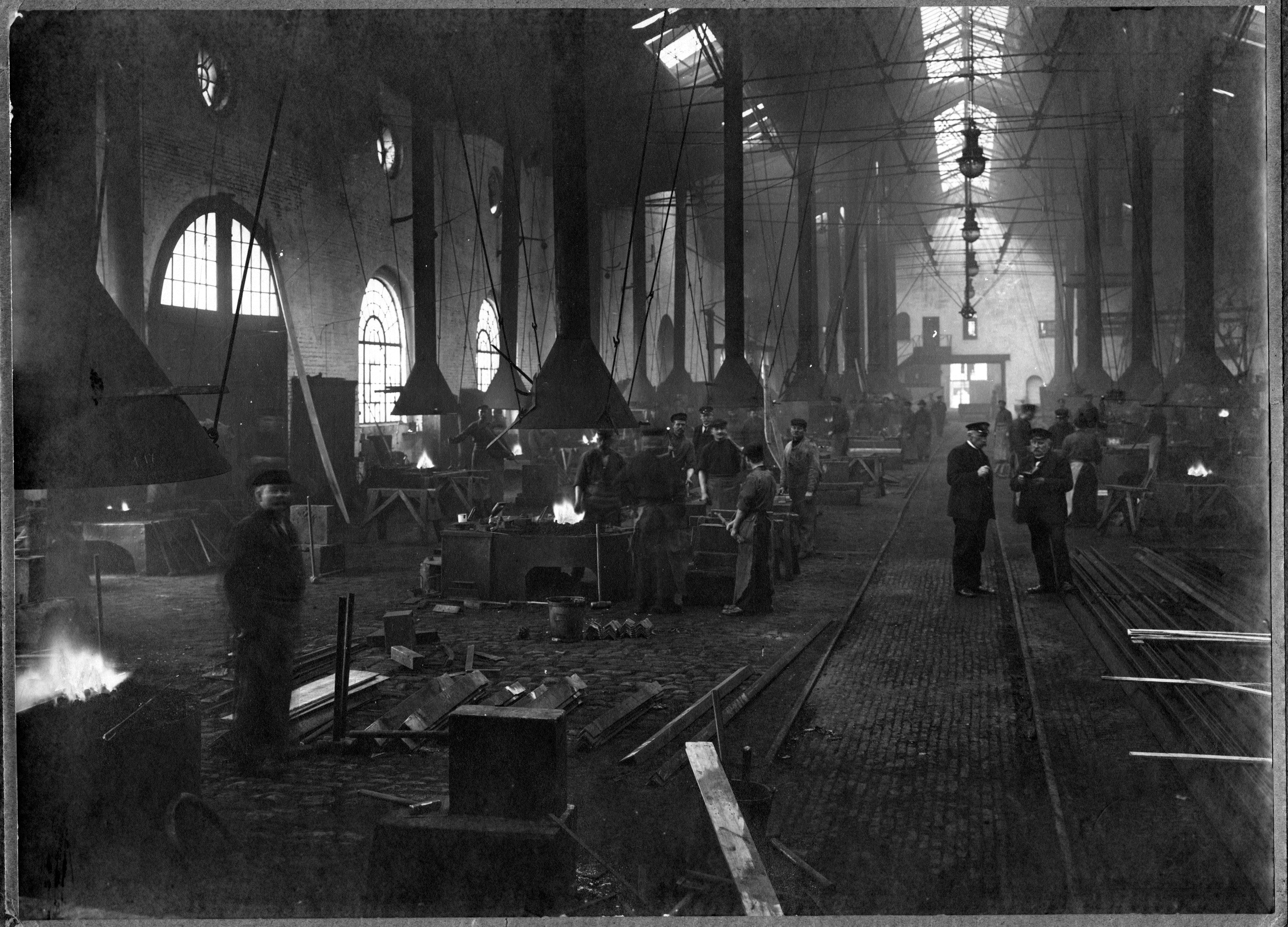
Kaiserliche Marine Werft, Wilhelmshaven, 1908

Kaiserliche Werft Wilhelmshaven (Wilhelmshaven Imperial Shipyard) was a German shipbuilding company in Wilhelmshaven, founded in 1871 and closed in 1918. Together with Kaiserliche Werft Danzig and Kaiserliche Werft Kiel it was one of three shipyards which solely produced warships for the Preußische Marine and the following German Kaiserliche Marine. With the end of World War I all three imperial shipyards were closed, but the Wilhelmshaven shipyard was reopened in 1919, first as Reichsmarinewerft Wilhelmshaven, and after 1935 named Kriegsmarinewerft Wilhelmshaven.

== History ==
Kaiserliche Werft Wilhelmshaven was a German shipbuilding company in Wilhelmshaven, a coastal town in Lower Saxony - North Germany - on the western side of the Jade Bight, a bay of the North Sea.

The predecessor of the Kaiserliche Werft was founded in 1853 under an agreement between the Grand Duchy of Oldenburg and the Kingdom of Prussia. The object of this agreement was a protection of Oldenburg's merchant fleet by Prussian navy on the one hand, on the other to enlarge the Prussian sphere of influence in the western part of Germany. When the Jade Treaty was signed about 3.10 km^{2} of Oldenburgian territory at the Jade Bight was ceded to Prussia.

The first years the naval base was only used as an arsenal, depot and repair facility for the developing Prussian fleet. Building up of necessary harbours, slipways, dockyards, workshops, etc. followed some years later.

After the Prussian victory over Austria in the 1866 Austro-Prussian War, the North German Confederation was founded and the shipyard was handed over from Prussia to this new confederation. The shipyard was officially opened 1869 by the Prussian King Wilhelm I. First known as Königliche Werft, the shipyard was now named Marinewerft des Norddeutschen Bundes (Naval Shipyard of the North German Confederation). With the proclamation of the German Empire in 1871 it received the final name Kaiserliche Werft Wilhelmshaven.

Forced by the needs of the rapidly growing German imperial navy it became necessary to enlarge shipbuilding capacities. Under the reign of Kaiser Wilhelm II and his fleet commander Grand Admiral Alfred von Tirpitz the shipyard was immediately extended. It soon became the greatest and most important of the three German imperial shipyards, beginning with about 3000 co-workers in 1880 and at last about 21,000 by the end of 1918, capable to build the largest and strongest warships of that time.

With the end of World War I the shipyard was closed for a short time, after that it was opened again, now named Reichsmarinewerft Wilhelmshaven and at last, some years later Kriegsmarinewerft Wilhelmshaven.

Ships built by Kaiserliche Werft with laid down/commissioned data (selection):

- 1859/1873, Aviso SMS Loreley, first ship of the Kaiserliche Werft (Serial No. 1)
- 1874/1878, Preussen-class ironclad SMS Grosser Kurfürst
- 1876/1879, Gunboats SMS Wolf and SMS Hyäne
- 1883/1886, Steam corvette SMS Charlotte
- 1887/1889, Schwalbe-class cruisers SMS Schwalbe and SMS Sperber
- 1890/1894, Brandenburg-class pre-dreadnought battleship SMS Kurfürst Friedrich Wilhelm
- 1891/1893, Siegfried-class coastal defense ship SMS Heimdall
- 1893/1895, Bussard-class cruiser SMS Geier
- 1895/1898, Kaiser Friedrich III-class pre-dreadnought battleship SMS Kaiser Friedrich III
- 1896/1900, Kaiser Friedrich III-class pre-dreadnought battleship SMS Kaiser Wilhelm II
- 1899/1902, Wittelsbach-class pre-dreadnought battleship SMS Wittelsbach
- 1900/1904, Deutschland-class pre-dreadnought battleship SMS Schwaben
- 1904/1907, Deutschland-class pre-dreadnought battleship SMS Hannover
- 1907/1909, Nassau-class battleship SMS Nassau
- 1908/1911, Helgoland-class battleship SMS Ostfriesland
- 1910/1912, Magdeburg-class light cruiser SMS Strassburg
- 1911/1914, König-class battleship SMS König
- 1913/1917, Derfflinger-class battlecruiser SMS Hindenburg
- 1915/----, Mackensen-class battlecruiser Serial No. 35, Ersatz A, construction stopped after launching, broken up 1922
- 1917/----, Conversion of 7 merchant-submarines to cruiser U-boats, including Deutschland to U-155

== Aircraft ==
- Kaiserliche Werft Wilhelmshaven 401
- Kaiserliche Werft Wilhelmshaven 461
- Kaiserliche Werft Wilhelmshaven 945
- Kaiserliche Werft Wilhelmshaven 947
